= Aliser =

Location in Khost Province, Afghanistan

Aliser علی سز
- Location in Afghanistan
- Coordinates: 33°27′57″N 70°5′28″E
- Country: Afghanistan
- Province: Khost Province
- District: Tere Zayi District
- Time zone: + 4.30

Ali Shir (Pashto: علي شیر) is the center of Tere Zayi District in Khost Province, Afghanistan. It is located on 33.4658°N 70.0911°E at 1,070 m altitude.

== See also ==
- Musakhel, Khost
- Tani, Khost
- Zambar, Afghanistan
- Khost Province
