= Afghans in the United Kingdom =

British Afghans
Total population
- Afghan-born residents 85,693 (England and Wales only, 2021); Ethnic Afghans: Afghans in Asian ethnic group: 95,518; Afghans in Other ethnic group: 20,649 (England and Wales only, 2021)

Regions with significant populations
- Greater London · West Midlands

Languages
- English · Dari · Pashto · others

Religion
- Primarily Sunni Islam, with some Shia Islam, Sikhism and Hinduism

British Afghans are British citizens and non-citizen residents born in or with ancestors from Afghanistan, part of the worldwide Afghan diaspora. The Office for National Statistics (ONS) estimates that there were 79,000 people born in Afghanistan living in the UK in 2019. This has risen to 85,693 in the 2021 census for England and Wales and 116,167 who stated their ethnicity as Afghan under the Asian and Other ethnic groups.

== History ==
=== Historical migration ===
The first Afghan immigrants to London were students, businesspeople and Afghan government officials. It wasn't until years later that significant numbers came in the form of refugees. The first large wave of Afghan immigrants to the UK were political refugees fleeing the 1980s communist regime and numerous others came in the early 1990s escaping Mujahideen. The number skyrocketed later that decade due to the rise of the Taliban in Afghanistan.

=== Refugees of war and asylum policies ===
As stated earlier, one of the large flows of Afghans to the UK was caused by refugees fleeing Afghanistan after the Taliban came to power. The country has been in a state of political unrest ever since. Despite the flow of immigrants and refugees remaining fairly stable over the new millennium period, the number of Afghans coming to the UK since the mid-2000s has completely eclipsed the recorded number of Afghans in the 2001 census, as more and more are fleeing the threat of violence and even death in their homeland during the War in Afghanistan. In 2003, the British government announced that they would begin enforced repatriation of failed asylum-seekers in April. This marked a break from the previous policy, observed continuously since 1978, of not returning any Afghans to their country of origin whether or not they were deemed to be economic migrants. At the time, roughly 700 Afghans applied for asylum in the United Kingdom each month, making them one of the largest group of asylum-seekers along with Iraqis.

Between 1994 and 2006, around 36,000 Afghans claimed asylum in the UK. Many whose claims were refused have not returned to Afghanistan, although the International Organization for Migration has helped some voluntarily return. 5,540 Afghan nationals were granted British citizenship in 2008, down from 10,555 in 2007.

Following the completion of the withdrawal of United States troops from Afghanistan in August 2021, the UK government launched the Afghan Citizens Resettlement Scheme (ACRS) in January 2022, to provide resettlement in the UK for Afghans who had worked for or were linked to the British government's presence in the country. In early December 2022, it was revealed that no Afghan had yet been resettled under the ACRS.

Afghan asylum seekers in the UK are facing homelessness as they are evicted from Home Office hotels without alternative housing. The government's plan to relocate 8,000 Afghans by August has raised concerns due to a housing shortage and long waiting lists. The Local Government Association has expressed difficulties in securing accommodation, while the Home Office emphasizes that hotels are not meant for long-term stays. The Illegal Migration Bill's provision to deport trafficking victims has faced criticism.

On 4 August 2023, amidst the UK's acute housing shortage and 104,510 households in temporary accommodations, local councils face strain. Concerns arise for Afghan families served eviction notices from hotels following the 2021 Taliban takeover; despite a minimum 3-month notice period and £285 million in Afghan Resettlement Scheme funds, approximately 24,600 individuals have found safety since January 2022.

In the six-year period between 2018 and 2023, 16,670 Afghan nationals entered the United Kingdom by crossing the English Channel using small boats – the second most common nationality of all small boat arrivals.

In 2025, the total cost of resettling about 39,000 Afghans, who had assisted British forces and were subsequently at risk of reprisals, to Britain was projected at £7 billion.

=== Afghan Response Route Scandal ===
In July 2025, the UK government disclosed the existence of the Afghan Response Route, a secret resettlement scheme launched in response to a 2022 Ministry of Defence data breach that exposed the personal details of over 18,000 Afghans who had applied to UK relocation programmes such as ARAP. The breach, which was initially concealed under a rare superinjunction, put many of the affected individuals at risk of Taliban reprisals. The scheme ultimately brought approximately 6,900 Afghans and their family members to the UK between 2023 and 2025. The total cost of the programme was estimated at £850 million, and its existence was excluded from official immigration figures and parliamentary disclosures until the injunction was lifted following a High Court ruling.

== Demography ==
The 2001 census recorded 14,875 Afghan-born people residing in the UK. The 2011 census recorded 62,161 people born in Afghanistan living in England, 562 in Wales, 737 in Scotland and 36 in Northern Ireland. The Office for National Statistics estimates that, by 2019, the Afghan-born population of the UK had risen to 79,000. About 49% are British nationals.

A number of unofficial population estimates have been made. Ethnologue estimates that there are 75,000 native Northern Pashto speakers in the UK, although these may comprise persons of other nationalities as well as Afghans. The number of Pashtuns in the UK is estimated at 100,000 (2009) forming the largest community of Pashtuns in the West, and the majority of Afghan Muslims in the UK are of Pashtun origin, however most British Pashtuns are of Pakistani Pashtun heritage. Other sources have put the Afghan population in London alone at 45,000 (2008) and 56,000. whilst the Afghan Association of London estimates that the population of Afghans in the whole UK stands at 70,000 (2009). The International Organization for Migration conducted a mapping exercise in 2006, suggesting that the Afghan population of the UK was 20,000.

=== Language ===
Most Pashtuns who originate from Afghanistan use Pashto in addition to English, with Dari (Afghan Persian) as a third language. Tajiks use Persian while Hazaras use Hazaragi, although some Tajiks and Hazaras are also fluent in Pashto. Pashto and Dari are both the official languages of Afghanistan.

=== Distribution ===
At the 2001 census, about 70% of Afghans lived in the capital with largest concentration in western boroughs. At the 2011 census, there were 37,680 Afghan-born residents living in the region, 60% of the UK total. The largest population was London Borough of Ealing with 6,015 residents, and is followed by Hounslow (4,463), Brent (3,698), Harrow (3,314), Hillingdon (3,248) and Barnet (3,234), altogether forming almost two-thirds of the London community. The least-three boroughs were Bromley (115), Bexley (109) and Havering (53).

In 2001 the single largest Afghan community in the UK was West Southall, where 1,121 Afghan-born people and many more of Afghan descent live. The locations with the fewest Afghan-born residents are Northern Ireland and Wales, which as subdivisions are estimated to have no greater than 100 Afghan residents each.

The West Midlands has the second largest number of Afghans by county, with the larger communities in Birmingham (second highest city in the country), Coventry and Wolverhampton, and minor communities in Walsall. The West Midlands region had an Afghan population of 6,552 in the 2011 census, and the South East England region had 4,819. South West England and North East England both had the lowest in England each numbering less than one thousand. The number for Wales was 562.

=== Religion ===
Most Afghans in the UK follow Sunni Islam although there is a significant number of Shias. There are also minorities of Sikh and Hindu Afghans in the Greater London area, with a particularly large Afghan Sikh community in the London Borough of Ealing, where 58% of Afghans are Muslims and a significant minority are Sikh in the 2001 census. In neighbouring Hounslow, 52% are Muslim, and in Hillingdon is 47%. By contrast, the Afghan population in Brent is over 90% Muslim. Islamic Afghan cultural centres are located in Willesden, Norbury and Hounslow.

Religion of Afghan Born - England and Wales
Religion	Census 2011		Census 2021	
Religion	Number	%	Number	%
Islam	50,381	80.3%	65,113	76.0%
Sikhism	6,899	11.0%	12,845	15.0%
No Religion	850	1.4%	1,609	1.9%
Hinduism	1,409	2.2%	1,558	1.8%
Christianity	568	0.9%	424	0.5%
Other Religions	49	0.1%	82	0.1%
Judaism	41	0.1%	29	0.0%
Buddhism	25	0.0%	11	0.0%
Not Stated	2,499	4.0%	4,025	4.7%
Total	62,723	100%	85,696	100%

== Economy and culture ==
Elonat is a Dari language advertising newspaper for the community. Community organisations include: the Afghan Student Union, the Afghanistan and Central Asian Association based in Feltham, the Afghan Association of London based in Harrow, and the Afghan Community Organisation of London based in Lewisham.

== Politics ==
Peymana Assad became the first British citizen of Afghan origin to hold any public elected office when she was elected a councillor for Roxeth ward in the London Borough of Harrow in 2018. She ran as the Labour Party parliamentary candidate for the Ruislip, Northwood and Pinner constituency in the 2019 general election, losing to the Conservative candidate.

== Notable individuals ==
- Waheed Arian, doctor and radiologist
- Farid Basharat, mixed martial artist
- Zarlasht Halaimzai, human rights activist
- Maziar Kouhyar, footballer
- Jamaluddin Mousavi, presenter
- Amin Nabizada, footballer
- Nooralhaq Nasimi, human rights activist
- Shabnam Nasimi, activist and commentator
- Aftab Sachak, actor
- Sana Safi, journalist and presenter
- Aryana Sayeed, singer and activist
- Idries Shah, writer and thinker
- Osman Yousefzada, artist

== See also ==
- Afghan diaspora
- Afghanistan–United Kingdom relations
- Afghan New Zealanders
- Afghan Australians
- Afghan Americans
- Afghan Canadians
- Afghans in the Netherlands
- Afghans in Germany
- Afghans in Sweden
- Anti-Afghan sentiment
- British Pashtuns
