= Musakhel =

Musakhel can refer to:

- the Musakhel tribe of Afghanistan and Pakistan
- Musakhel District, Afghanistan, part of the province of Khost, Afghanistan
  - Musakhel, Khost, the administrative centre of the district of the same name in the province of Khost, Afghanistan
- Musakhail District, Pakistan, part of the province of Balochistan, Pakistan
  - Musakhel Bazar, an administrative centre of the district of the same name in the province of Balochistan, Pakistan
- Musakhel, Punjab, a village in Mianwali district in the province of Punjab, Pakistan
