= Zambar Toy =

River in Afghanistan

- Location of mouth

Location
- Country: Afghanistan
- Province: Khost Province

Physical characteristics
- Mouth
  - coordinates: 33°31′32″N 69°55′56″E

The Zamba Toy (Pashto: زامبا توي) is a river of Khost Province (formerly in Paktia Province), southeastern Afghanistan. It flows past the village of Zambar.
