= Sekhamir Kalay =

Village in Khost Province, Afghanistan

Sekhamir Kalay سخامیر کلای
- Location in Afghanistan
- Coordinates: 33°17′15″N 69°54′45″E
- Country: Afghanistan
- Province: Khost Province
- District: Gurbuz District
- Elevation: 1,207 m (3,960 ft)
- Time zone: UTC+4:30

Sekhamir Kalay (Pashto: سخامیر کلی) is a village and the center of Gurbuz District, Khost Province, Afghanistan. It is located at 33.2875°N 69.9125°E at 1,207 m altitude in the northwestern part of the district.

== See also ==
- Khost Province
