= Dadwal =

Village in Khost Province, Afghanistan

Dadwal ډاډوال
- Location in Afghanistan
- Coordinates: 33°18′37″N 69°47′57″E
- Country: Afghanistan
- Province: Khost Province
- District: Mando Zay District
- Elevation: 1,267 m (4,157 ft)
- Time zone: UTC+4:30

Ḍaḍwāl (Pashto: ډاډوال) is a village and the center of Ismailkhel and Mandozai District in Khost Province, Afghanistan. It is located on 33.3103°N 69.7992°E at 1267m altitude on south side of Shamal river, it is connected to north a village Aliwat by a bridge which constructed by US military (Joint Provincial Reconstruction Team) in 2007. The villagers are mostly educated and trained in different jobs. There is girls high school.

== See also ==
- Khost Province
