= Alexander Vedyakhin =

Russian top manager

- Александр Александрович Ведяхин
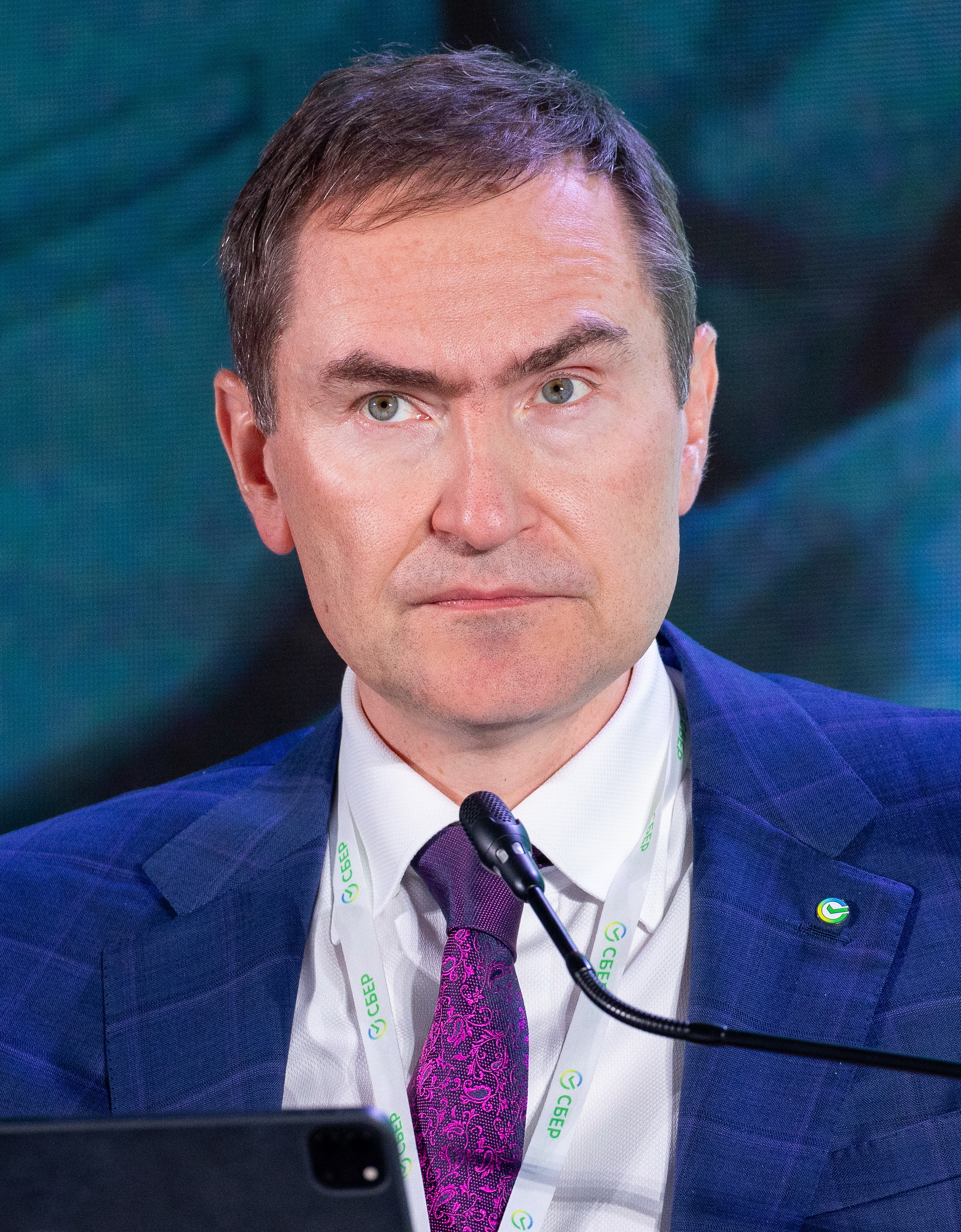
- Born: 20 February 1977 (age 48); Volgograd, Russian SSR, Soviet Union
- Citizenship: Russia
- Education: Volgograd State Technical University (1999); Russian Presidential Academy of National Economy and Public Administration (2010)
- Occupations: business manager; chief risk officer
- Years active: 2018–present
- Employer: Sberbank
- Title: First Deputy Chairman of the Board of Sberbank
- Board member of: Sberbank; Deniz Finansal Kiralama AS
- Awards: Medal of the Order "For Merit to the Fatherland"; Order of Alexander Nevsky

Alexander Alexandrovitch Vedyakhin (Russian: Александр Александрович Ведяхин; born 20 February 1977) is a Russian business manager, First Deputy Chairman of the board, under CEO Herman Gref, and member of the supervisory board of Sberbank. He oversees the development of business-to-business services for corporate clients, the sales network and international business, and leads the ESG division of Sberbank. He is a member of the board of Sberbank Corporate University, and a member of the board of directors of the Skolkovo Foundation. In 2020–2022, he was included in Kommersant's Top 1000 Russian Managers list. He has worked in the banking sector since 1999 and has been First Deputy Chairman at Sberbank since 2018.

== Birth and education ==
Vedyakhin was born on 20 February 1977 in Volgograd, the fourth largest city on the Volga river, the administrative centre of the Volgograd Oblast, and a large industrial and university centre.

In 1999 he graduated with honours from the Volgograd State Technical University with a degree in world economics. In 2001, he was awarded a degree of Candidate of Economic Sciences.

In 2010, he graduated from the banking MBA program at the Academy of National Economy under the Government of the Russian Federation with a specialization in banking management. Two years later, he completed a joint advanced training program of Sberbank and London Business School. From 2016–2018, he trained at the Stanford Graduate School of Business. In 2018, he completed a course in artificial intelligence and machine learning at the Massachusetts Institute of Technology.

== Career ==
=== Before Sberbank management (1999–2015) ===
Between 1999 and 2008, Vedyakhin was employed at the Volgograd branch of Sberbank, where he advanced from a senior cashier-controller to deputy branch manager. At the end of 2007, Sberbank acquired the small Ukrainian bank NRB-Ukraine and registered it as a subsidiary in Ukraine. In 2008, he took the position of First Deputy Chairman of the Board of Sberbank in Ukraine. After the purchase of the Turkish DenizBank by Sberbank in 2012, he moved to the position of chief risk officer (CRO) and joined the board of directors of the Turkish bank.

=== Sberbank management (2015–present) ===
In July 2015, Vedyakhin moved to Sberbank's central office and became Senior Vice President, Chief Risk Officer of Sberbank Group, and head of the Risk Block. He oversaw the Artificial Intelligence Laboratory and the Competence Development Centre for Data Research.

Since June 2018, he has been a member of the executive board and First Deputy Chairman of the board. He is in charge of the Corporate and Investment Business, the sales network, the International Business department, the Problem Assets department, the Artificial Intelligence and Machine Learning department, the Artificial Intelligence Laboratory, the Centre for Partner Financing and Special Projects, the ESG Directorate, the Centre for High-Potential Business Lines, and the Marketing and Communications department.

In addition, he is a member of the board and Academic Council of Sberbank Corporate University; a director of the Skolkovo Foundation; on the supervisory board of the FinTech Association (Russia). He is also on government working groups concerning systemic technological changes in the field of industrial construction, research centres in the field of Artificial Intelligence.

Deputy Prime Minister of the Russian Federation Dmitry Chernyshenko noted that, due to Vedyakhin's active participation, the National Code of Ethics for Artificial Intelligence and the federal project of the same name were developed, resulting in Sberbank becoming the federal centre of competence in the field of AI.

=== Sanctions ===
In the spring of 2022 Vedyakhin was included, along with Herman Gref, in a list of sanctions by the US, Canada, UK, Australia and New Zealand in relation to the Russo-Ukrainian War.

== Awards and recognition ==
On 17 November 2016, Vedyakhin was awarded the Medal of the Order "For Merit to the Fatherland", 2nd class "for a great contribution to the development and improvement of the banking system".

2016 — Medal of the Order “For Merit to the Fatherland,” 2nd class

2018 — Commendation from the President of the Russian Federation

In 2021 he was awarded the Order of Alexander Nevsky.

He was acknowledged as third in Kommersant's Top 1000 Russian Managers list for 2020, and as number two on the list in 2021 and 2022 in the category of Commercial Directors (Banks).

== Family ==
Vedyakhin is married and has two daughters.
