= ACAA =

ACAA may refer to:

- Afghanistan and Central Asian Association
- Air Carrier Access Act
- Allegheny County Airport Authority
- American Collegiate Athletic Association
- Atlantic Collegiate Athletic Association
