= Rabia Nasimi =

Afghan refugee and human rights activist

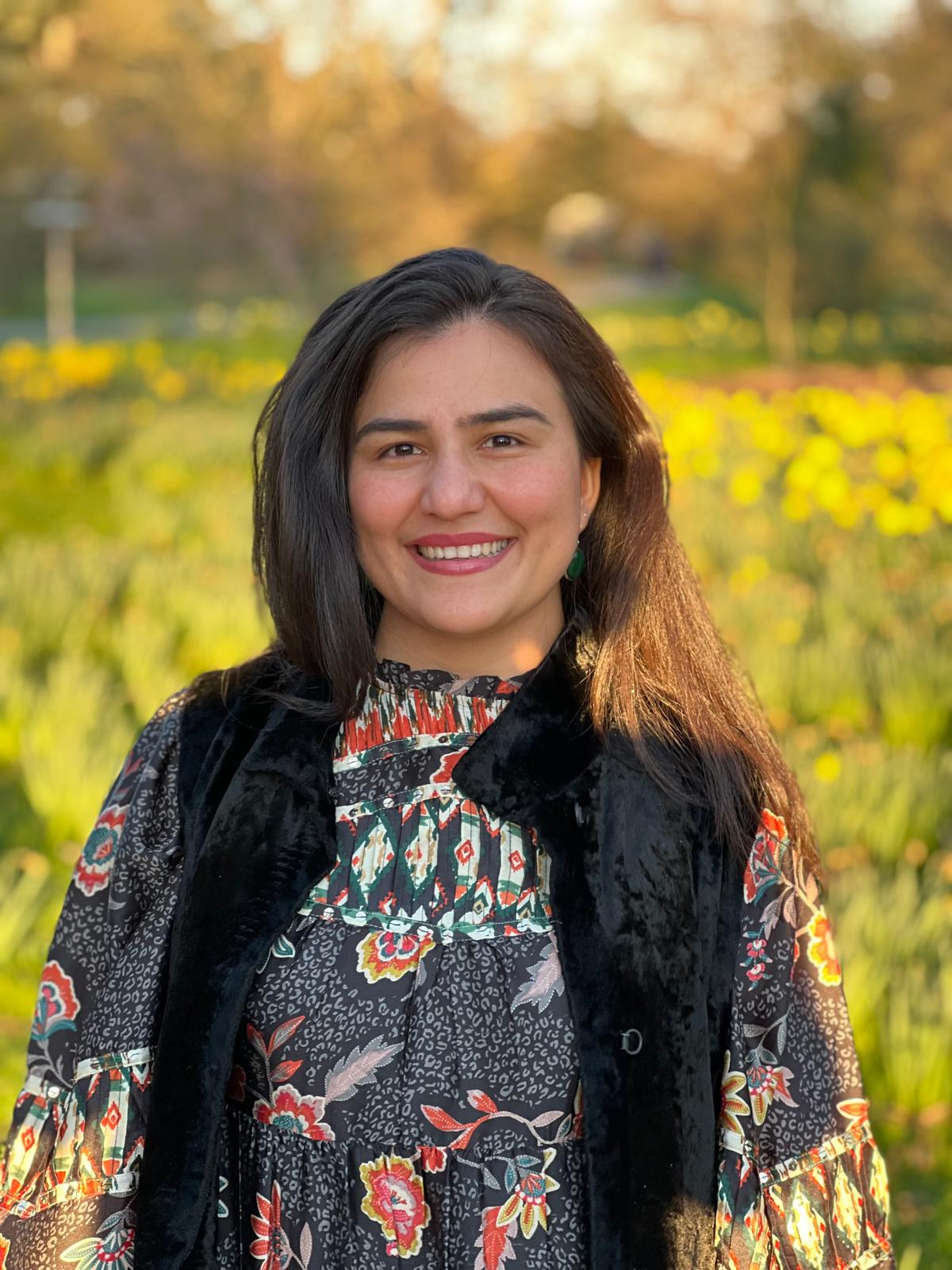
- Nasimi in 2026

Personal details
- Born: 15 December 1993 (age 32) Odesa, Ukraine
- Parent(s): Nooralhaq Nasimi, Mahboba Nasimi
- Relatives: Shabnam Nasimi, Darius Nasimi and Sheekeba Nasimi
- Education: Goldsmiths University of London (BA); London School of Economics (MSc); University of Cambridge (PhD)

Rabia Nasimi (Dari: رابعه نسیمی; born 15 December 1993) is a politician, academic, human rights activist and former refugee who fled Afghanistan with her parents and siblings in 1999. She is currently a Labour Party councillor for East Acton.

== Early life and education ==
Nasimi and her family fled Afghanistan in 1999 out of fear of persecution at the hands of the Taliban. After a journey of more than 3,000 miles, they arrived in Dover in the back of a refrigerated container, and settled in New Cross, South London.

In 2001, the family established the Afghanistan and Central Asian Association (ACAA), a charity dedicated to improving the lives of Afghans and all refugees in London. In 2012, she studied BA Sociology and Politics at Goldsmiths University of London. She then completed an MSc in Sociology (Research) at the London School of Economics and Political Science. In 2017 she was accepted as a sociology PhD candidate at the University of Cambridge, although did she not graduate with a PhD.

== Career ==
In 2015, at the age of 21, Nasimi began her role as Development Officer for the Afghanistan and Central Asian Association. In this role, she was responsible for launching several services and shaping the charity's long-term strategy.

In 2020, Rabia joined the Civil Service as a Fast Stream Social Researcher at the Department for Health and Social Care. In 2021, Rabia Afghanistan joined the Afghan Resettlement Team after being recruited to be Team Leader for Research and Insights at the Department for Levelling Up, Housing and Communities. In August 2022, she was appointed as Head of ESM research for the UK COVID-19 Inquiry. Alongside this role, Nasimi worked as a trustee for the Separated Child Foundation.

She is currently the head of NHS partnerships at the Department of Health and Social Care. In this role, Nasimi advises ministers, senior officials and the Social Partnership forums co-chairs in the delivery of the SPF, including its meetings and work programme. Additionally, Nasimi's work for the Afghanistan and Central Asian Association continues, organising events for refugees with over 3, 000 attendees annually.

On 7 May 2026, Nasimi was elected as a Labour councillor for East Acton.

== Publications ==
Nasimi's academic work focuses on the intersection of gender, migration and integration. Her sociological publications have contributed to growing research on the experiences of migrant women. Nasimi has contributed to policy-focused research, discussing the role of government and community organisations in supporting refugees.

=== Journal articles ===
- "This place means freedom to me”: needs-based engagement with marginalized migrant Muslim women in London - R Nasimi and N Thompson (2022)
- Who is supporting the career development of refugees? The role of grassroots organisations - R Nasimi and G Frigerio (2019)
- Art practice with migrant women: Three challenges to rediscovering home- R Nasimi and M Fathi (2022)

=== Book chapters ===
- Community Work with Migrant and Refugee Women - R Nasimi, N Thompson, A Turner (2022)
- Critical Research and Creative Practice with Migrant and Refugee Communities - R Nasimi and N Thompson (2025)

=== Blogs ===
- Growing up in an alien country wasn't easy - R Nasimi (2022)
- Inside Policy: Operation Warm Welcome - R Nasimi (2022)
- Supporting the mental health of refugees: lessons from the UK's Afghan resettlement scheme - R Nasimi (2022)

== Honours and awards ==
Nasimi was nominated for the Afghan Professionals Network Aspire Award for outstanding contributions to the Afghan community in London in 2015. In 2017, she was nominated for the Lewisham Mayor's Award for contributions to Lewisham, and was nominated for the WeAreTheCity Rising Stars Award in 2018. Alongside this, she was shortlisted for the Women of the Future Award, and for the Asian Voice Charity Awards in the Most Inspiring Young Person category for her work advocating for refugee rights both in the UK and Afghanistan. In 2022, she was shortlisted for the Asian Women of Achievement Awards for public and was named one of WeAreTheCity’s Pioneer 20.
