= British Pashtuns =

Total population
- United Kingdom: 50,597 (2021/22 Census); England: 48,163 (2021); Scotland: 1,796 (2022); Wales: 542 (2021); Northern Ireland: 96 (2021)

Regions with significant populations
- Greater London; Birmingham; Bradford; Manchester; Leeds; Sheffield; Luton; Coventry

Languages
- English; Pashto; Urdu; Dari

Religion
- Islam

Related ethnic groups
- British Pakistanis; British Afghans

British Pashtuns (Pashto: انګرېز پښتانه) are citizens or residents of the United Kingdom who are of Pashtun ancestry. As of the 2021 census, there were at least 50,000 Pashto-speakers living in the UK. According to other estimates, the total population of British Pashtuns is as high as 100,000, making them the largest Pashtun diaspora community in Europe.

A part of the wider British Pakistani and British Afghan communities, most Pashtuns in Britain trace their origins to the Khyber Pakhtunkhwa region of northwest Pakistan and to the country of Afghanistan, although sizeable minorities of Pashtun ancestry from outside of these regions and of a non-Pashto speaking background also exist. The largest British Pashtun populations are principally found in Greater London, followed by the cities of Birmingham, Bradford and Manchester in England.

== History ==
=== Colonial era ===
The Pashtuns, also historically referred to as ethnic "Afghans" and as Pathans in other parts of South Asia, speak Pashto and originate from the Pashtunistan region of northwest Pakistan and Afghanistan. They comprise a sizeable segment of the over one-million strong British Pakistani community. They also represent the largest ethnicity amongst the British Afghan community. Anglo-Afghan relations date back to the early 19th century. Following the conclusion of the Second Anglo-Sikh War in 1849, the Second Anglo-Afghan War in 1880 and the demarcation of the Durand Line with Afghanistan in 1893, Pashtun territories east of the frontier were annexed by the British Empire and amalgamated into the North-West Frontier Province (NWFP) and upper Baluchistan regions of British India – today part of Pakistan – with the Frontier Tribal Areas forming a "buffer zone" between these territories and Afghanistan.

As British subjects, Pashtuns were amongst the indentured workers who were transported for labour from British India to various other British colonies starting in the 19th century. In the first half of the 20th century, Pashtun men from British India were actively recruited as seamen, or lascars, for British steamship companies while others arrived to work industrial jobs in Britain. They lived mostly in working-class neighbourhoods and some of these men are known to have married local British women. In addition, the North-West Frontier was a fertile recruiting ground for the British Indian Army. The outbreak of World War I and World War II saw the deployment of thousands of Pashtun soldiers to other parts of the British Empire in support of the imperial war effort. Many of these men would end up in Great Britain to help fill up labour shortages, working in army canteens and munitions factories, and some stayed on in the UK after the wars ended. There were also those who travelled to Britain during the colonial era to pursue higher education at major educational institutions, although most of them were temporary migrants and returned home upon the completion of their studies.

=== Postcolonial era ===
After the partition of British India and Pakistan's independence in 1947, emigrants from the erstwhile NWFP – now Khyber Pakhtunkhwa – were among the first group of Pakistanis to arrive in Britain in the 1950s and 1960s, alongside Mirpuris and Punjabis. Immigration to Britain was made easier by the fact that Pakistan was a Commonwealth member state. These early migrants tended to be from rural areas in the NWFP and they too found employment in various British manufacturing industries, helping plug workforce scarcity in the post-war economy. It was not uncommon for men to migrate first, in order to support extended family members back home through remittances, before settling their wives and children in the UK permanently. A professional and more urbanised stream of Pakistani immigrants including doctors entered the UK in the 1960s. The beginning of the decades-long Afghan conflict in 1979 led to a large exodus of Afghan Pashtun immigrants to Western countries, with many settling in the UK.

== Demographics ==
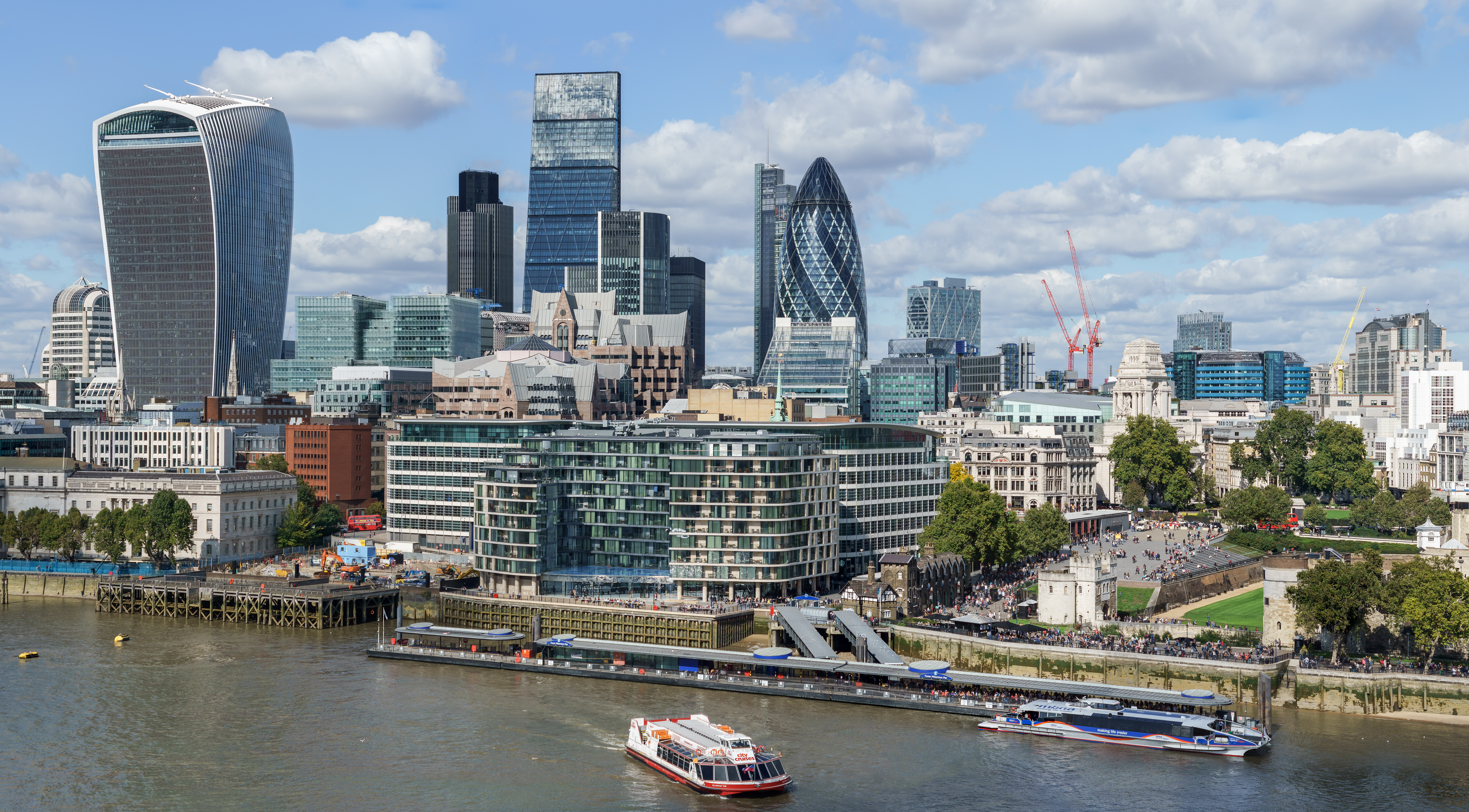
The Greater London area is home to the largest British Pashtun population.

=== Population ===
As the British census only collects data based on national origin, Pashtuns usually self-report their ethnicity as Pakistani or Afghan for statistical purposes. As of 2009, the total Pashtun population in the UK was estimated to number 100,000. The language database Ethnologue reported at least 87,000 Pashto-speakers in the UK. According to another estimate, Pashtuns accounted for about 11 percent of the British Pakistani population as of 2014, which numbered over 1.1 million at the time.

In the 2011 census, Pashto was identified as a native tongue by 40,277 individuals in England and Wales. In Scotland and Northern Ireland, this figure stood at 874 and 83 respectively. In the England school census of 2012, 12,035 pupils with English as a second language in state-funded schools listed Pashto as their first language; this marked an increase from 7,090 pupils in 2008 and 10,950 pupils in 2011.

In the 2021 census results, there were 48,163 speakers of Pashto in England, 1,796 in Scotland, 542 in Wales and 96 in Northern Ireland, reflecting an overall increase in the British Pashtun population.

=== Population distribution ===
England, and the Greater London region in particular, are home to the largest Pashtun communities in the UK. The regions with the next biggest populations are the West Midlands, Yorkshire and the Humber, North West England, South East England and the East of England. The London boroughs with the largest Pashtun populations are Barnet, Harrow, Brent, Ealing, Hillingdon, Hounslow, Newham, Redbridge and Croydon. Outside of London, the most significant concentration of Pashtuns is in the city of Birmingham, followed by Bradford, Manchester, Leeds, Sheffield, Luton and Coventry. Many Pashtuns reside in ethnic enclaves where Pakistanis and other Asians form a substantial population.

=== Origins ===
British-Pakistani Pashtuns are often broadly categorised into two demographic groups. The first and larger group comprises ethnic Pashtuns hailing from their native region, Khyber Pakhtunkhwa, who are predominately Pashto-speaking. They originate from various districts in the province, including Peshawar, Mardan, Swat, Nowshera, Kohat, Bannu and Swabi, as well as the Hazara region. The village of Saleh Khana in Nowshera District has been referred to as "Little England" due to its large expatriate population in Britain, primarily in the West Midlands region. The second group consists of the Pathan ethnic minorities belonging to other provinces, who are primarily non-Pashto speaking but are of Pashtun ancestry. This latter group includes, for example, the Punjabi-speaking Pathans of Attock, located in the Chhachh region of northern Punjab, whose history of emigration to the UK dates back to the pre-independence era.

British-Afghan Pashtuns also originate from different regions in Afghanistan, such as Kabul, Nangarhar, Kandahar, Wardak, Logar, Khost and Loya Paktia, as well as some from the northern regions of the country.

== Culture ==
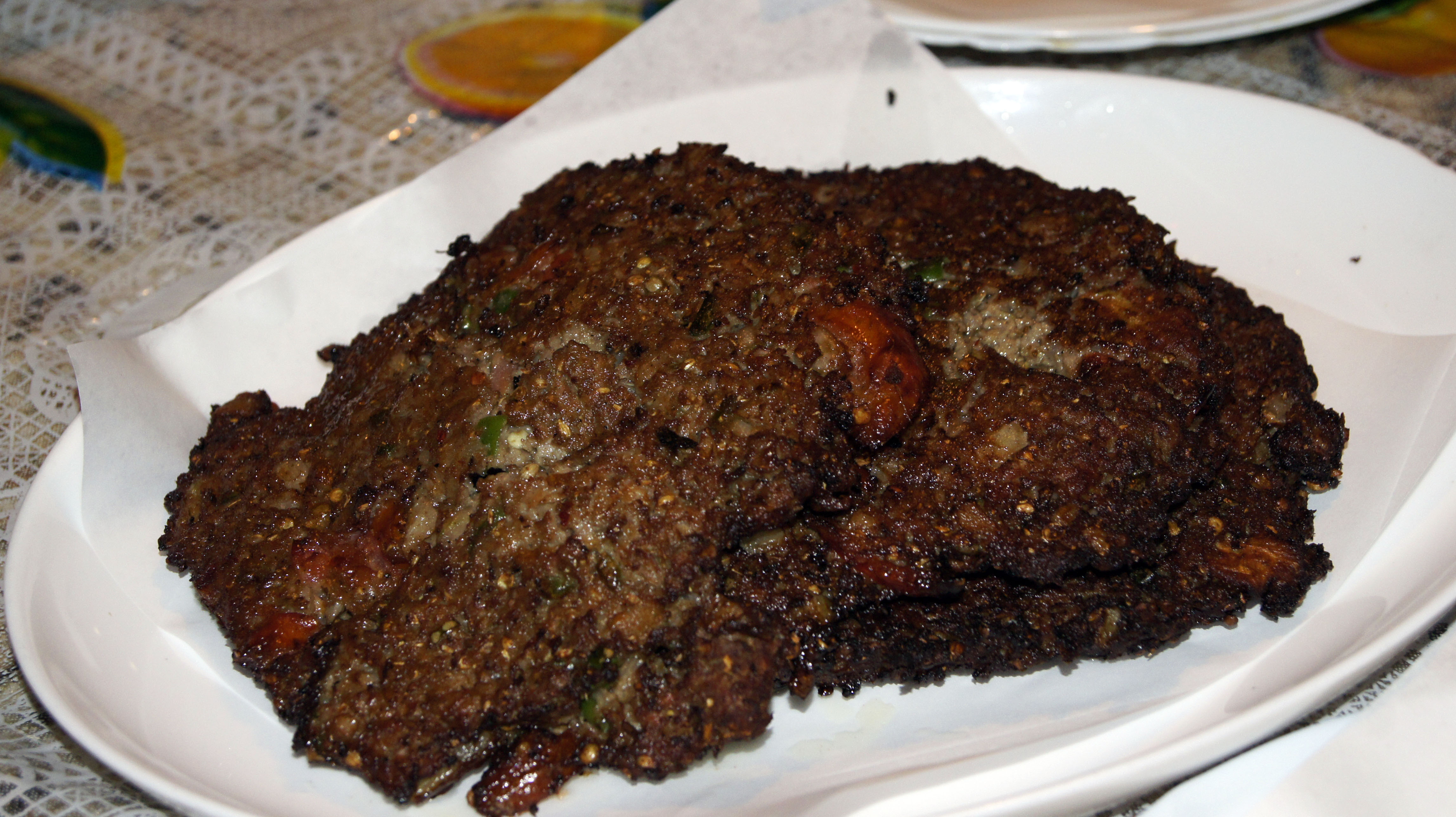
A plate of lamb chapli kebab served at a restaurant in Birmingham.

British Pashtuns belong to several tribes and speak a variety of Pashto dialects, depending on their geographical origin. Urdu and Dari, which are national languages in Pakistan and Afghanistan respectively, are commonly spoken as additional languages. They are a Muslim community, traditional in outlook, and follow the cultural code known as Pashtunwali. Many of them carry the surname Khan, although not all Khans are necessarily Pashtun.

British Pashtuns remain socially active within their communities through cultural organisations such as the Pukhtoon Cultural Society, United Pashtun Society, Pak Pashtoon Association and the Pashtun Trust. They also maintain ties with their homeland, socially and politically. Political parties, including those with Pashtun nationalist leanings such as the Awami National Party and Pashtun Tahaffuz Movement, operate in the UK through their locally registered chapters.

Restaurants and eateries serving authentic Pashtun cuisine are readily available in major cities of England. Popular dishes include the gosht karahi, Kabuli pulao, chapli kebab, naan bread and various kinds of barbecued tikka. BBC Pashto, based out of London, is the largest media service catering to the Pashtun community in Britain.

Cricket and football are the most popular sports played among young British Pashtuns. Afghan-born cricketer Hamidullah Qadri has played for England at the under-19 level.

== Notable people ==
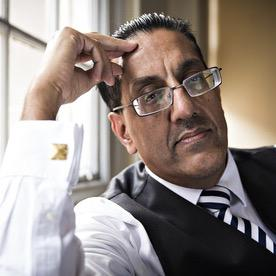
Nazir Afzal, former prosecutor in the Crown Prosecution Service and current chancellor of the University of Manchester.

The following is a list of notable personalities; the listees are British citizens or residents unless otherwise noted:

- Nazir Afzal, solicitor and crown prosecutor.
- Salma Agha, playback singer and actress who worked in Pakistani and Bollywood films.
- Shaheen Sardar Ali, law academic.
- Bat for Lashes, singer and songwriter.
- Dynamo, magician.
- Zahid Hussain, fiction author and Manchester councillor.
- Nazia Iqbal, Pashto folk singer.
- Ahsan Khan, actor.
- Hasnat Khan, heart surgeon; known for his relationship with Diana, Princess of Wales.
- Junaid Khan, former Pakistani cricketer.
- Reham Khan, journalist, author and filmmaker.
- Hamidullah Qadri, first-class cricketer.
- Ziauddin Sardar, scholar and writer.
- Robert Warburton, soldier and administrator in British India.
- Malala Yousafzai, Pakistani female education activist and Nobel Prize laureate.
- Osman Yousefzada, artist, writer and social activist.
- Idries Shah, was Afghan teacher in the Sufi.
- Imran Ahmed, -Political strategist and CEO of the Center for Countering Digital Hate.
- Tahir Shah is British author and journalist and son of Idries Shah Afghan author and teacher in the Sufi tradition.
- Adnan Ghalib, Photographer.
- Jamil Dehlavi British Independence film director and producer.

== See also ==
- Pashtun diaspora
- British Pakistanis
- Afghans in the United Kingdom
