= Nooralhaq Nasimi =

Afghan-British human rights activist (born 1967)

Nooralhaq Nasimi MBE, Hon. D.S.S

Personal details
- Born: 1967 (age 58–59) Afghanistan
- Citizenship: United Kingdom
- Spouse: Mahboba Nasimi
- Children: Shabnam Nasimi, Rabia Nasimi and 2 others
- Education: Volgograd Polytechnic Institute
- Occupation: Founder and Director of the Afghanistan and Central Asian Association
- Awards: Member of the Order of the British Empire (2023); British Citizen Award (2020); Queen's Award for Voluntary Service (2018, organisational)

Nooralhaq Nasimi MBE (Dari: نورالحق نسیمی; born 1967) is a former refugee who fled Afghanistan with his family, and who now campaigns for refugee rights in Europe and his former home country. In 1999, immediately after arriving in the UK, he founded the Afghanistan and Central Asian Association (ACAA), a charity dedicated to helping refugees in London to integrate. In 2011 he founded the European Campaign for Human Rights in Afghanistan, an organisation dedicated to raising awareness of the plight of Afghans worldwide. He currently serves as the director of the Afghanistan and Central Asian Association based in Hounslow, London.

== Early life and education ==
Nasimi was born in Ghorband a district of Parwan Province in the Northeast of Kabul, Afghanistan. He then moved to Pul-e Khomri where he spent the rest of his childhood. At the age of 18, Nasimi won a scholarship to Rostov-on-Don to study mechanical engineering. Following this, he returned to Afghanistan where he worked in a logistics firm as a mechanic.

Nasimi grew up witnessing the invasion of Afghanistan by the USSR, and aged 21 he was conscripted. He served 4 years as a soldier with the Afghan Army in Wardak Province, distributing food, water, newspapers and running workshops about equality for soldiers. After completion of his military service, in 1989 he received a scholarship to study engineering in Volgograd Polytechnic Institute and then moved to Baku, Azerbaijan to study International Law. He concluded his studies in Odesa where he met his wife Mahboba who was also studying there. On completion of his studies he was awarded both an MA in Law and PhD in Political Science from Odesa University.

After returning to Afghanistan in 1998, one year after Taliban takeover, his high level of education in conjunction with the spent spent studying in the former USSR made him and his family a target for Taliban persecution. In 1999 Nasimi fled Afghanistan with his young family. After a three month journey through Hungary, Slovakia, Austria, Germany, the Netherlands and Belgium, he and his family crossed the English channel, spending 12 hours locked in the back of a refrigerated container before arriving in Dover and claiming asylum in the United Kingdom.

== Personal life ==
His daughter, Shabnam Nasimi, is the former policy advisor to Minister for Afghan Resettlement Victoria Atkins MP and Minister for Refugees Richard Harrington. His daughter, Rabia Nasimi, currently works as Head of the ESM Research at the UK Covid-19 Inquiry. His son Darius Nasimi served as the first British Afghan Conservative Candidate for Hanworth Village, London Borough of Hounslow. His youngest daughter, Sheekeba Nasimi graduated with a Bachelor's of Law from the University of Law in 2025.

== Career ==
Upon his arrival to the UK, Nasimi studied English at Lewisham College in 2000 - he realised language was the first barrier for many refugees and migrants. Inspired by the difficulties he faced integrating into British society and learning the English language, Nasimi established the Afghanistan and Central Asian Association in Lewisham in 2001. The charity is dedicated to helping refugees integrate and has since expanded to operate across London, offering services including language support, legal aid, a women's educational project and supplementary education programmes for child refugees. The organisation also has an established ESOL (English for Speakers of Other Languages) for Integration Programme, which runs across their offices and virtually. The ACAA has also partnered with UK Job Centres and colleges to assist those searching for employment. Collaborating with the UK government on multiple occasions, other projects have included a home-office funded programme aiming to tackle extremism by providing workshops for members of the muslim community, and a project in partnership with the Ministry of Justice to reduce reoffending rates by supporting vulnerable people recently released from prison. With the return of the Taliban to Afghanistan in 2021 the ACAA became a frontline help point for refugees and asylum seekers arriving in the UK, its capacity growing hugely due to the situation, and the organisation also became a central contact point for British media in relation to the Afghan crisis. Shortly following the crisis, ACAA served an important role in providing evidence to the Foreign Affairs Committee enquiry and advising UK policy towards Afghanistan.

In 2018 Nasimi accepted the Queens Award for Voluntary Service on behalf of the ACAA for their work supporting refugees in London and was awarded the British Citizen Award for Volunteering and Charitable Giving in 2020. He was also shortlisted for Charity Executive of the Year for the Third Sector Awards in 2024.

Nasimi has been an active campaigner promoting the rights of Afghans in Afghanistan and campaigning for refugee rights around the world. In 2013 Nasimi travelled to Afghanistan and launched the country's first two Citizens Advice Bureaus, which have since helped over 7,500 people with issues ranging from domestic violence to poverty and employment. He has also supported refugees in migrant camps in Europe, lobbied politicians in the UK and at the EU and in 2011 launched the European Campaign for Human Rights in Afghanistan (ECHRA). The ECHRA has since held conferences in London, Germany and Greece bringing together experts in the fields of migration and human rights to collaborate on solutions to the migrant crisis and ways to protect human rights in the ongoing conflict in Afghanistan

Nasimi has also written as a columnist for first, the magazine for councillors published by the Local Government Association, on issues relating to refugee support.

Nasimi was appointed Member of the Order of the British Empire (MBE) in the 2023 New Year Honours for services to refugees. In July 2024, he was also awarded an Honorary Doctorate Degree of Doctor of Laws by the Royal Holloway University of London.

In a 2026 profile for UK for UNHCR, Nasimi described his childhood in Pul-e Khomri, where from the age of eight he worked as a street child — selling water, loading lorries with melons, and carrying water to highland villages — to support his family. On settling in the UK, his family became the first Afghan family to settle in Lewisham. By 2026, in the 27 years since its founding, the ACAA had assisted refugees from 55 countries and ran projects from Feltham to Liverpool.

== Efforts toward a future Afghanistan ==
Following the Taliban's return to power in August 2021, issues of political representation and engagement with Afghan communities have been widely discussed among policymakers. Within this context, Nooralhaq Nasimi has contributed to policy debates in the United Kingdom concerning Afghanistan's future and the role of diaspora communities.

Nasimi has provided written evidence to UK parliamentary inquiries addressing Afghanistan, including submissions on the role of diaspora organisations in informing government policy and supporting Afghan populations. In this evidence, he emphasised that Afghan diaspora groups possess detailed contextual knowledge of local conditions and argued that closer cooperation between policymakers and diaspora organisations could improve policy outcomes.

His work has also been associated with efforts to strengthen links between Afghan communities in the United Kingdom and developments within Afghanistan. Through diaspora engagement, he has contributed to discussions on how transnational networks can support communication, policy awareness, and community-level understanding across borders. Such approaches have been referenced in broader policy discussions as potential mechanisms for engaging Afghan civil society following the reduction of international presence in the country.

Nasimi has also taken part in public and academic discussions concerning governance in Afghanistan, including the importance of inclusive political systems and representation across ethnic and social groups. His contributions have highlighted the role of policy design, data, and community-level engagement in addressing long-term instability and marginalisation.

In November 2025, Nasimi delivered a public talk at St Catherine's College, University of Oxford, titled "What's Next for Afghan Refugees in the UK? Refugee and Asylum Policy," discussing human rights, civil society, and pathways forward for Afghan refugees.

In wider policy discussions, diaspora-based actors such as Nasimi have been contrasted with figures whose influence is primarily derived from regional or historical networks within Afghanistan. Commentary has noted differences between internationally engaged individuals operating from abroad and actors with more geographically concentrated bases of support, highlighting ongoing debates around representation and political legitimacy in Afghanistan's evolving political landscape.
