= Shamal, Khost Province =

Settlement in Khost Province, Afghanistan

Shamal
- Location in Afghanistan
- Coordinates: 33°18′41″N 69°32′52″E
- Country: Afghanistan
- Province: Khost Province
- District: Shamal District
- Elevation: 5,187 ft (1,581 m)
- Time zone: UTC+4:30

Shamal (Pashto: شمال) is the center of Shamal District, Khost Province, Afghanistan. It is located at 33.3114°N 69.5478°E at 1581 m altitude in the eastern part of the district. The town is located within the heartland of the Kharoti tribe of Pashtuns.

== See also ==
- Khost Province
