= Musakhel District =

Musakhel District may refer to:

- Musakhel District, Afghanistan, part of the province of Khost, Afghanistan
- Musakhel District, Pakistan, part of the province of Balochistan, Pakistan
