= Gurbuz District =

Gurbuz District ګربز ولسوالۍ
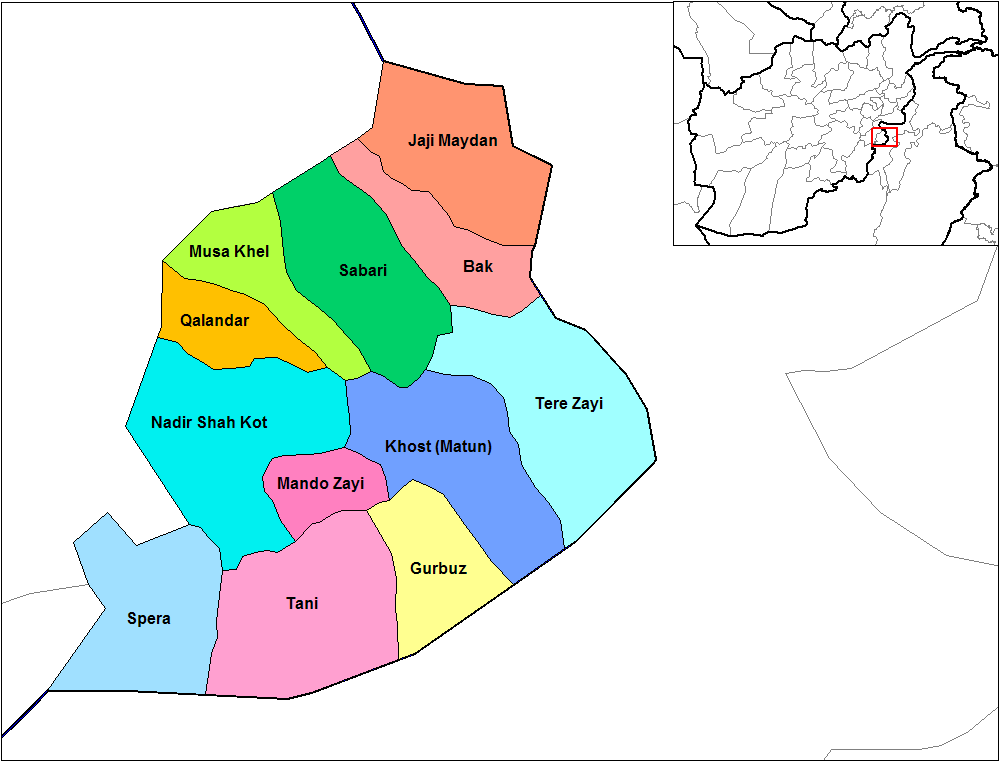
- Gurbuz District shown in yellowish in the southeast

- Location in Afghanistan
- Coordinates: 33°17′15″N 69°54′45″E
- Country: Afghanistan
- Province: Khost
- Capital: Sekhamir Kalay

Government
  - Type: Central
  - District Governor: Abdulhai Zazi

Population (2020)
  - Total: 29,627
- Time zone: UTC+4:30 (Afghanistan Standard Time)

Gurbuz District (Pashto: ګربز ولسوالۍ) is situated in the southeast part of Khost Province, Afghanistan. It borders Tani District to the west, Mando Zayi and Khost districts to the north and Khyber Pakhtunkhwa in Pakistan to the southeast. Governor of Gurbuz District is Abdulhai Zazi. The Afghan National Security Forces (ANSF) are responsible for all law enforcement activities in the district.

According to Afghanistan's National Statistics and Information Authority (NSIA), the estimated population of the district in 2020 was 29,627. The district center is the village of Sekhamir Kalay situated in the northwestern part of the district. It is inhabited by the Gurbuz, a Wazir subtribe.

== See also ==
- Districts of Afghanistan
