= Tani, Khost =

Location in Khost Province, Afghanistan

Tani تنی
- Location in Afghanistan
- Coordinates: 33°14′32″N 69°49′41″E
- Country: Afghanistan
- Province: Khost Province
- District: Tani District
- Elevation: 1,303 m (4,275 ft)
- Time zone: UTC+4:30

Tani (Pashto: تاني) is a village that serves as the center of Tani District, Khost Province, Afghanistan. It is located on 33.2422°N 69.8281°E at 1,303 m altitude. The Taniwal tribe reside within it along side the Karlani tribe & their allied tribes of Sitakzai and Bannuzai.

== Climate ==
Tani has a cold semi-arid climate (Köppen climate classification: BSk) with hot summers and cool winters.

Climate data for Tani, Khost Province
Month	Jan	Feb	Mar	Apr	May	Jun	Jul	Aug	Sep	Oct	Nov	Dec	Year
Daily mean °C (°F)	4.1 (39.4)	6.5 (43.7)	12.1 (53.8)	16.2 (61.2)	22.2 (72.0)	26.8 (80.2)	26.7 (80.1)	25.4 (77.7)	22.7 (72.9)	17.2 (63.0)	10.5 (50.9)	5.6 (42.1)	16.3 (61.4)
Average precipitation mm (inches)	28.2 (1.11)	55.0 (2.17)	67.0 (2.64)	33.6 (1.32)	22.3 (0.88)	15.8 (0.62)	47.0 (1.85)	44.1 (1.74)	8.1 (0.32)	6.8 (0.27)	10.9 (0.43)	5.4 (0.21)	344.2 (13.56)
Source 1: ClimateCharts
Source 2: World Weather Online (precipitation & humidity)

== See also ==
- Khost Province
