= Sabari District =

Sabari aw Yaqubi District
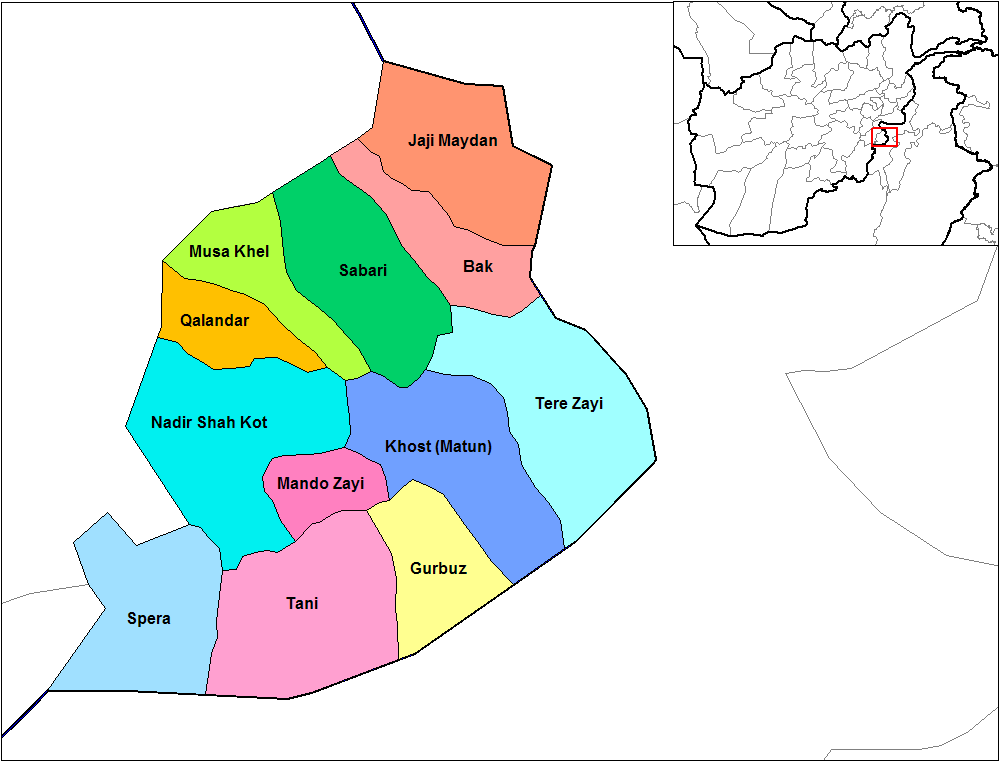
- Sabari District shown in dark green in the northwest part of Khost Province

- Location in Afghanistan
- Coordinates: 33°27′39″N 69°59′24″E
- Country: Afghanistan
- Province: Khost
- Capital: Sabari

Government
  - Type: Central

Population (2020)
  - Total: 80,114
- Time zone: UTC+4:30 (Afghanistan Standard Time)

Sabari aw Yaqubi District (Pashto: د صبري او یعقوبي ولسوالۍ) is situated in the northwest part of Khost Province, Afghanistan. It borders Musa Khel District to the west, Paktia Province to the north, Bak District to the east and Tere Zayi and Khost districts to the south. Sabari and Yaqubi District has its own governor, who is appointed by the serving governor of Khost Province, and the Afghan National Security Forces (ANSF) are responsible for all law enforcement activities.

According to Afghanistan's National Statistics and Information Authority (NSIA), the 2020 estimated population of the district was 80,114 people. The district center is the town of Yaqubi, located in the most eastern part of the district.

== History ==
On 19 May 2020, gunmen killed three brothers and injured a child in Sabari District when they were returning to their home from a nearby mosque after offering the evening prayer and breaking their Ramadan fast. The Taliban denied their role in the attack.

== Security and politics ==
It was reported on 20 November 2009 that, in Zambar in Sabari and Yaqubi District, a compound was searched by ISAF forces and several AK-47s recovered. Several suspected insurgents were detained. The search came as ISAF forces attempted to find a reputed Haqqani commander believed to be in the area.

== See also ==
- Districts of Afghanistan
