= British Punjabis =

People of Punjabi origin living in the UK

Bartānvī Panjābī
- Distribution by regional area

Total population
- 700,000 (2006)

Regions with significant populations
- Mainly England · Smaller communities in Scotland, Wales and Northern Ireland

Languages
- English · Punjabi (Note: various dialects including Pothwari and Pahari) · Hindi · Urdu · Bagri

Religion
- Sikhism · Hinduism · Islam · Christianity

Related ethnic groups
- Punjabi diaspora · British Indians · British Pakistanis · British Pashtuns

British Punjabis are citizens or residents of the United Kingdom who either have total or partial Punjabi ancestry or heritage, originating in the Punjab region of Pakistan and India. Numbering 700,000 in 2006, Punjabis represent the largest ethnicity among British Asians. They are a major sub-group of the British-Indian and British Pakistani communities.

== History ==
The United Kingdom is home to the largest Punjabi diaspora after Canada. Immigration from the Punjab region to the UK began during the colonial era, when Punjab was a province of British India. Punjabi migrants in the nineteenth and early twentieth centuries were mainly domestic servants, seamen working on British merchant ships and visiting civil servants or students seeking professional qualifications. A notable early figure was Duleep Singh, former Maharajah of the Sikh Empire, who was exiled to Britain in 1853. His daughter Sophia Duleep Singh became a prominent suffragette and a pioneer of women's rights in Britain.

The first significant Punjabi migration began in the 1950s when labour shortages in the UK following the Second World War led the British administration to encourage recruitment from across the Commonwealth. The vast majority of these migrants were men from India and Pakistan, who after a period of acclimatisation began to settle permanently and invite their friends, wives and children to join them. These migrants often found work in the manufacturing, textile and service sectors, including a significant number at Heathrow Airport. The town of Southall in west London became an early hub for Punjabi migrants, and would become the country’s premier British Asian town, dubbed Little Punjab.

In the 1970s, there was widespread migration of Punjabis from East Africa, many of whom had retained their British passports following the independence of Kenya and Uganda. East African Punjabis are known as twice migrants, and came to the UK amidst growing discrimination at home, symbolised by the Expulsion of Asians from Uganda in 1972. Unlike earlier Punjabi migration to the UK, East African Punjabis migrated as families. Many were successful businessmen or professionals with savings and able to adjust quickly to life in Britain.

== Demographics ==
Distribution of Punjabi speakers by ward in London. 0.0%-0.99% 1%-2.99% 3%-4.99% 5%-9.99% 10%-14.99% 15% and greater

In the 2011 UK Census, 273,000 people identified Punjabi as their first language. Of these, 271,000 were in England, 23,000 in Scotland, 1,600 in Wales and a smaller number in Northern Ireland. Thus, Punjabi is the third most commonly spoken language in the UK. The Southall area of Greater London is home to a significant Punjabi population. The total population of Punjabis in the UK is estimated to exceed 700,000.

Immigrants from the Pakistani province of Punjab are mainly Punjabi Muslims, with smaller numbers of Christians. The majority originate from the northern and central parts of Punjab, such as: Pothwar, Rawalpindi, Attock, Chakwal, Jhelum, Jhang, Faisalabad, Gujranwala, Gujrat, Chiniot, Sargodha, Toba Tek Singh and Lahore. Punjabis are estimated to comprise one-third of the British Pakistani population, making up the second largest sub-group after Mirpuri Kashmiris. The tribes to which British Pakistani Punjabis belong include Jats, Gujjars, Awans, Arains, Rajputs and several others like Pathans of Punjab and Kashmiris of Punjab.

The population of Indian Punjabis in the UK has been estimated at 466,563 in 2011, based on an earlier estimate that they constitute 45% of the British Indian community. Of these, majority are Sikhs while the rest are mainly Punjabi Hindus. The areas where they predominately originate from are Jalandhar, Amritsar, Ludhiana, Kapurthala, Bathinda, Hoshiarpur, Nawanshahr and Moga. The UK has the second largest Sikh diaspora outside India, after Canada.

== Culture ==
Punjabi culture strongly defines the identity of British Punjabis. The bhangra form of music was popularised by Punjabi immigrants in the UK during the 1970s. England has long been associated with the Asian Underground scene which gave rise to Punjabi pop music, especially among the younger generations. Punjabi cuisine is also highly popular in the country. Chicken tikka masala has been called a "national dish" of Britain.

Punjabis are known for their entrepreneurial activities. Research by Teesside University shows that the British Punjabi community is one of the most highly educated and successful in the UK. Notable businesspeople include Surinder Arora who ranks amongst the wealthiest Britons. Other Punjabis have achieved notability in the theatres of British politics, sports and entertainment.

== See also ==
- List of British Punjabis
- British Indians
- British Pakistanis
  - British Mirpuris
- Punjabi diaspora
- Hinduism in the United Kingdom
- Sikhism in the United Kingdom
