= Pamir University =

University in Khost, Afghanistan

- پامیر پوهنتون
- Established: April 24, 2011
- Chancellor: Tariq Ismail
- Head: Syed Karim Shah Nekmal
- Location: Khost, Khost Province, Afghanistan; 33.337106°N 69.917411°E

Pamir University (Pashto: د پامیر پوهنتون) is a private higher education institute which was officially inaugurated on April 24, 2011, in the city of Khost, Khost Province, southeastern Afghanistan.

Pamir University has three faculties: computer science, language and literature, and economics.

Pamir University is the first private university in the South-east Zone of Afghanistan that is registered with the ministry of Higher Education of Afghanistan.
