= Nadir Shah Kot District =

Nadir Shah Kot District نادر شاه کوټ ولسوالۍ
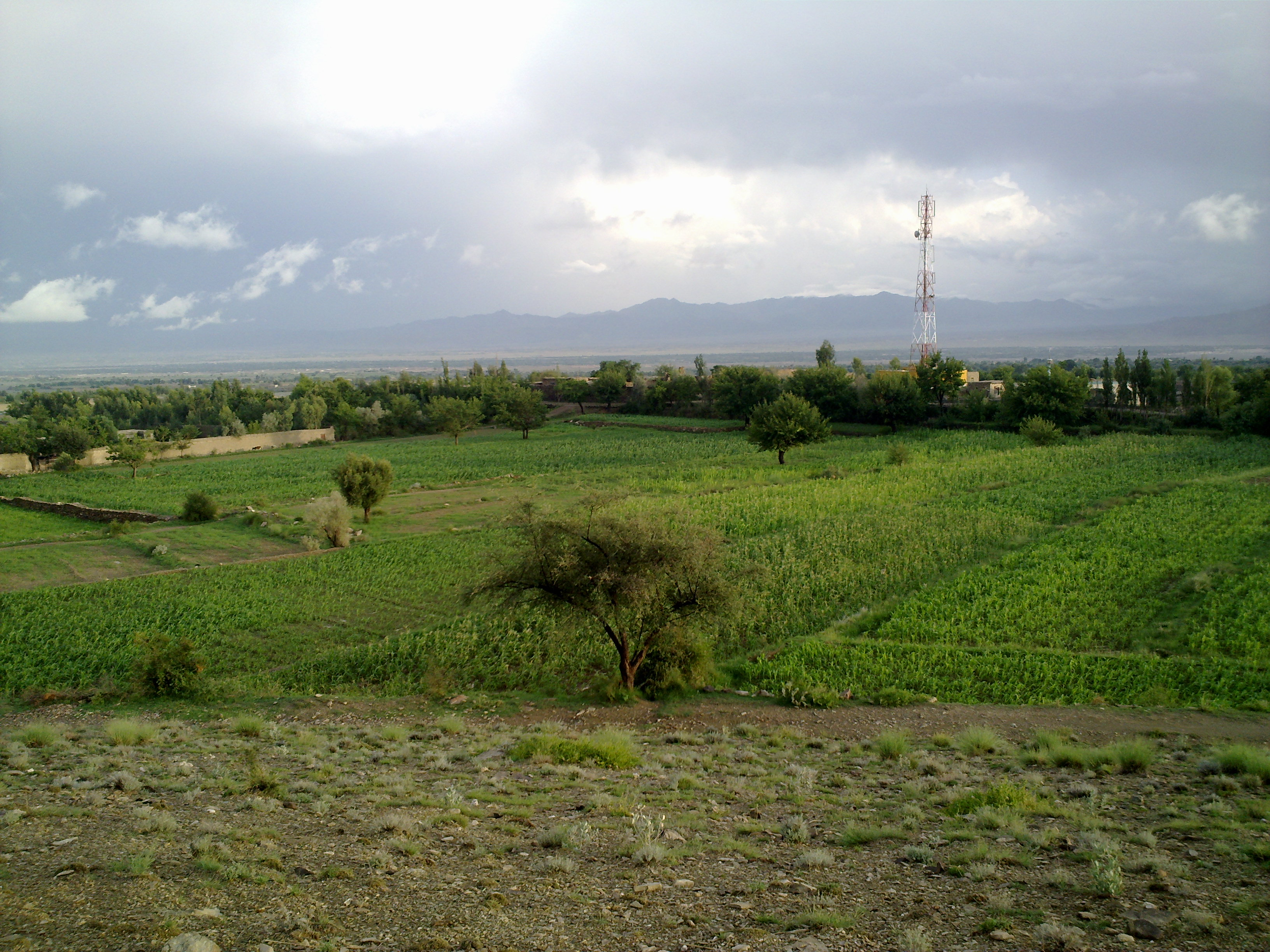
- A village in the Nadir Shah Kot District of Khost Province, Afghanistan

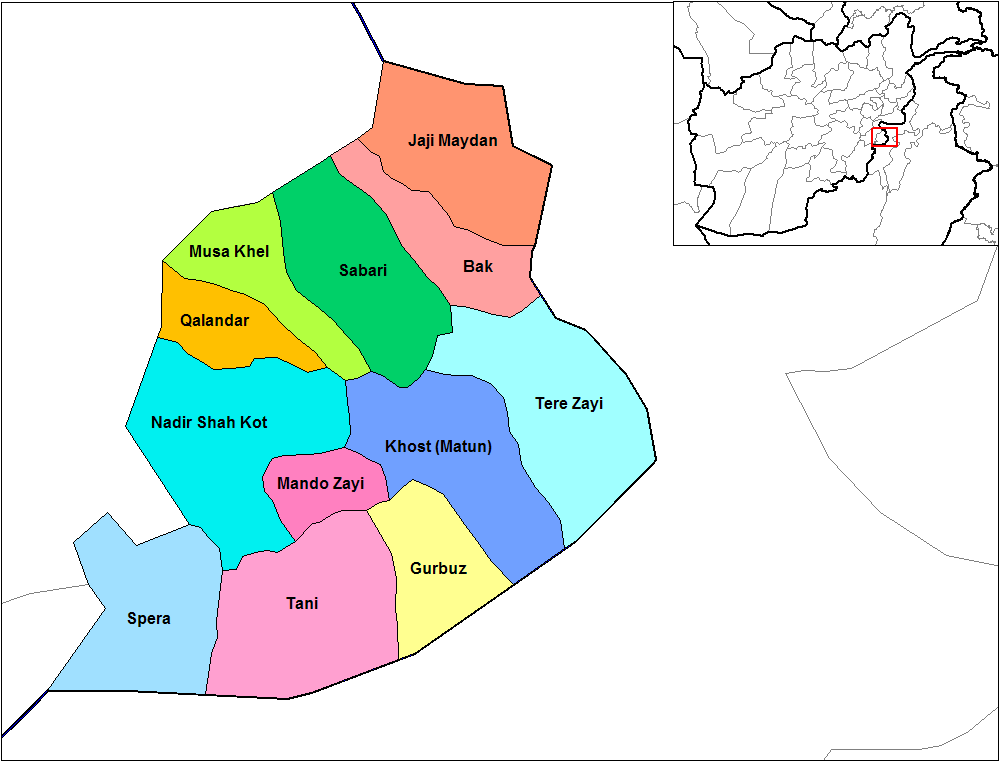
- Nadir Shah Kot District in turquoise in the western part of Khost Province
- Coordinates: 33.3111°N 69.6933°E
- Country: Afghanistan
- Province: Khost
- Capital city: Nadir Shah Kot

Government
  - Type: Central

Population (2020)
  - Total: 36,005
- Time zone: UTC+4:30 (Afghanistan Standard Time)

Nadir Shah Kot District (Pashto: نادر شاه کوټ ولسوالۍ) is situated in the western part of Khost Province, Afghanistan. It borders Paktia Province and Shamal District to the west, Qalandar District to the north, Musa Khel District to the northeast, Khost (Matun) District to the east, Mandozayi District to the southeast and Tani and Spera districts to the south.

According to Afghanistan's National Statistics and Information Authority (NSIA) the 2020 estimated population of the district was 36,005 people. The district center is Nadir Shah Kot - a village at 1386 m altitude on the main road to Khost. Nadir Shah Kot District has its own governor, who is appointed by the serving governor of Khost Province, and the Afghan National Security Forces (ANSF) are responsible for all law enforcement activities.

== History ==
On 7 May 2020, a roadside IED explosion in Nadir Shah Kot District killed Gen. Sayed Ahmad Babazai, the Police Chief of Khost Province, his secretary, and one bodyguard, and also wounded another person. The Taliban claimed responsibility for the attack.

== See also ==
- Districts of Afghanistan
