= List of regions of Afghanistan by Human Development Index =

This is a list of regions of Afghanistan by Human Development Index as of 2023.

Rank	Region	HDI (2023)
Medium human development
1	Central (Kabul, Wardak, Kapisa, Logar, Parwan, Panjshir)	0.568
Low human development
2	North (Samangan, Sar-e-Pul, Balkh, Jawzjan, Faryab)	0.517
-	Afghanistan (average)	0.496
3	South East (Ghazni, Paktya, Paktika, Khost)	0.495
4	Central Highlands (Bamyan, Daykundi)	0.495
5	East (Nangarhar, Kunar, Laghman, Nuristan)	0.477
6	West (Ghor, Herat, Badghis, Farah)	0.466
7	North East (Baghlan, Takhar, Badakhshan, Kunduz)	0.464
8	South (Uruzgan, Helmand, Zabul, Nimroz, Kandahar)	0.423

== See also ==
- List of countries by Human Development Index
