= Qalandar District =

District of Afghanistan

Qalandar District (Pashto: قلندر ولسوالۍ) is situated in the western part of Khost Province, Afghanistan. It borders Paktia Province to the west, Musa Khel District to the north and east and Nadir Shah Kot District to the south. The population is 9,100 (2006). The district center is the village of Khost Mela 33.5150°N 69.6778°E.
