= Shamal District =

Western part of Khost Province, Afghanistan

Shamal District (Pashto: شمال ولسوالۍ) is situated in the western part of Khost Province, Afghanistan. The district is within the heartland of the Zadran tribe of Pashtuns. It borders Paktia Province to the west, Nadir Shah Kot District to the east and Spera District to the south. The population is 12,200 (2006). The district center is the village of Shamal, situated in the eastern part of the district. It was moved from Paktia Province.
