= Afghanistan and Central Asian Association =

Charitable incorporated organisation

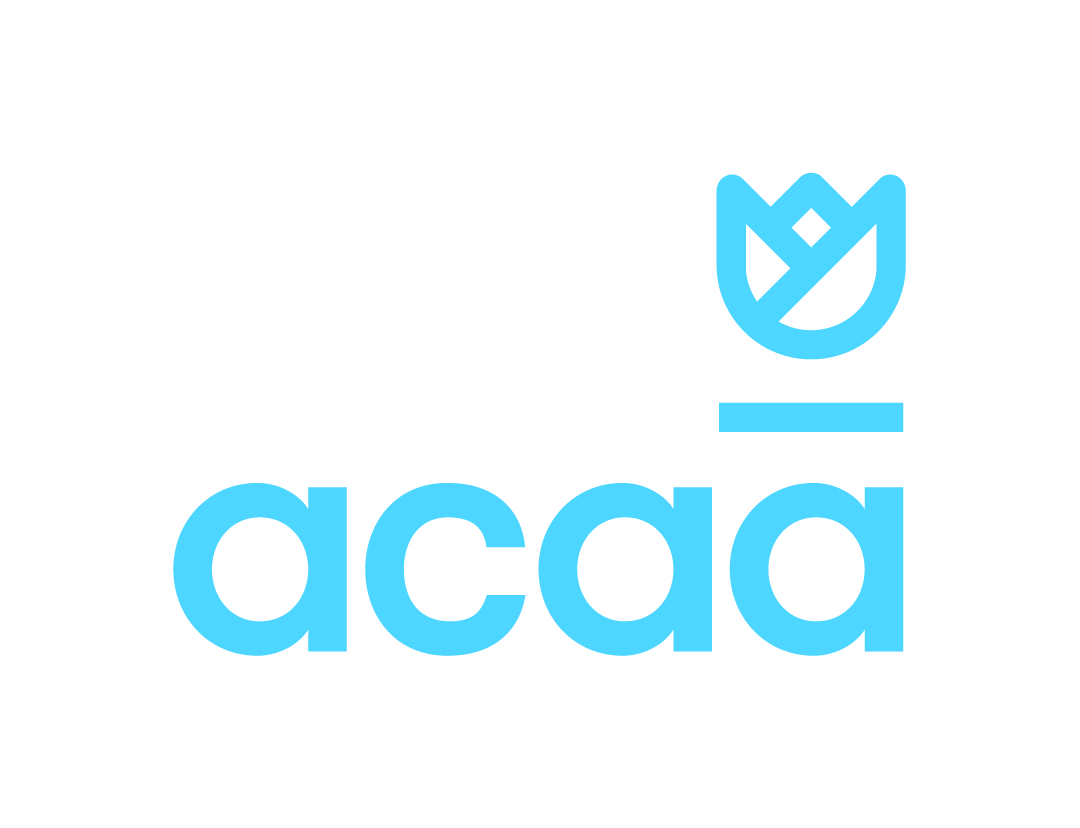
- Abbreviation: ACAA
- Formation: 1999; 27 years ago
- Founder: Nooralhaq Nasimi
- Headquarters: Hounslow, West London
- Key people: Rabia Nasimi, Shabnam Nasimi, Darius Nasimi
- Staff: 15
- Volunteers: 150
- Website: acaa.org.uk

Afghanistan and Central Asian Association (ACAA) is a charitable incorporated organisation that supports London's refugee community and the Afghan diaspora in the United Kingdom. The organisation also campaigns for human rights, democracy and the fair treatment of refugees in Afghanistan and around the world. The charity has a dual mission of supporting the successful integration of refugees into Britain through grassroots service provision and of advocating for the promotion of human rights and fair treatment of refugees globally through hosting events and international conferences. The ACAA is the only London-based charity supporting Afghan and Central Asian migrants that has a community centre, running a variety of services, such as ESOL classes and a legal aid clinic, to help refugees integrate as well as hosting regular cultural events and international conferences to raise awareness of the plight of refugees. In 2018 the ACAA was awarded the Queens Award for Voluntary Service. and in 2019 won the Refugee Support Service of the Year Award.

== History ==
=== Launch ===
The organisation was founded in 2001 by Nooralhaq Nasimi who arrived in the UK in 1999 in a refrigerated container with his wife and three young children, as a political refugee fleeing persecution at the hands of the Taliban. With the aid of local MPs and community organisations, Nasimi established the ACAA in 2001 in order to help other refugees, based on lessons he learnt from his own experiences attempting to integrate into the UK. The organisation was initially a community group that brought together Afghan refugees, but evolved to become a service provider that attempts to bridge gaps that exist for refugees who are attempting to build new lives in a new country.

== Work in the United Kingdom ==
=== Support for refugees ===
The charity offers a wide range of services for refugees in the UK to promote cultural integration and increase agency for individuals in the community. Services range from ESOL classes, legal clinics, a community fridge, mental health and more general mentoring services, financial advice, digital literacy support and many others. The organisation also provides services specific to particular demographics in the refugee community. For example, female empowerment workshops for Afghan women and a Girls Digital Education project for the digital literacy of Afghan girls is provided by the association. It also offers a Balkh and Ghorband Girls Football club, with 80 attendees in 2022, and a supplementary Saturday School for children and young people, with 150 students enrolled in 2022.

Today the charity runs ESOL classes, offers free legal clinics, runs a supplementary Saturday school for refugee children, offers a women's corner for female refugees and organises regular cultural and social events. In 2017 the charity expanded significantly when it opened a second office in Hounslow, London. The charity now runs services across three London boroughs. In 2021, after the fall of Kabul, the charity provided emergency supplies and housing clinics for incoming refugees. The charity now runs services across three London boroughs. In June 2018 it worked with Lewisham Borough Council to assist recent refugee arrivals to access public services.

Although the charity's work is aimed towards the Afghan and Central Asian diaspora, it has a non-exclusion policy and in early 2023, it launched its ‘Ukrainian Resettlement Project,’ expanding its impact by providing services for Ukrainian refugees. The association continues to support the Ukrainian community in the UK through long-term resettlement services.

=== Response to the 2021 Afghanistan evacuation ===
Following the fall of Kabul to the Taliban in August 2021 and the subsequent evacuation of Afghan civilians under Operation Pitting, the Afghanistan and Central Asian Association (ACAA) expanded its support for newly arrived Afghan refugees in the United Kingdom. Based in Feltham, near Heathrow Airport, the charity provided legal advice, English language classes, welfare support, housing assistance, and integration services for Afghans arriving under the Afghan Relocations and Assistance Policy (ARAP) and the Afghan Citizens Resettlement Scheme (ACRS).

The organisation continued to support Afghan refugees after the initial evacuation. In 2024, the BBC reported that ACAA's community centre in Feltham was assisting families who had arrived through family reunification and those living in temporary accommodation near Heathrow Airport. Speaking to the BBC, ACAA director Nooralhaq Nasimi said that many Afghans continued to experience anxiety about relatives who remained in Afghanistan, while Darius Nasimi highlighted the pressures faced by local authorities in supporting newly arrived families and concerns following attacks on asylum accommodation during the 2024 UK riots.

The charity has also been cited by refugee advocacy organisations as one of several community organisations assisting Afghan refugees with resettlement in the UK. Right to Remain highlighted ACAA's role in providing legal advice and practical support while discussing wider challenges facing the UK's Afghan resettlement schemes, including delays in permanent housing, family reunification, and access to legal assistance.

In 2023, KentLive reported that demand for the charity's services had increased significantly following the Taliban's return to power, with the organisation continuing to provide support to Afghan refugees settling in the United Kingdom while advocating for improved resettlement and integration services.

=== Political awareness ===
The association also does advocacy work for the rights of refugees in the UK. Through social media, information on their website and international peace conferences, the association promotes its values of cultural integration and the rights of refugees in the UK.

The association has also advised government initiatives, such as the home office’s ‘prevent’ initiative, aiming to reduce radicalisation and support for terrorist organisations.

=== Cultural events ===
The Afghanistan and Central Asian Association organises cultural festivals, conferences, and public discussions focused on refugee integration, Afghan and Central Asian culture, and human rights issues. The organisation's events have included policy discussions on Afghanistan and refugee resettlement, as well as community festivals held during the UK's annual Refugee Week.

Since 2017, the organisation has organised annual Refugee Week events in West London, featuring cultural performances, food, arts, and activities involving refugee and migrant communities. The festivals have received support from local organisations and community partners. The London Housing Foundation has highlighted ACAA's Refugee Week activities as part of the organisation's work supporting Afghan and Central Asian communities in the United Kingdom.

In 2023, ACAA held its Refugee Week Festival at Gunnersbury Park in West London. The event included cultural performances, food stalls, and activities representing Afghan, Central Asian, Ukrainian, and other refugee communities.

In 2024, ACAA held its Refugee Week Festival at Cranford Community College in Hounslow. The event was included among local Refugee Week activities in the borough and featured cultural performances and community activities celebrating refugee communities in west London. In 2025, the event was extended to a two-day festival, drawing an audience of more than 7,000 people and expanding the reach of the charity. This figure grew to 10,000 in 2026 as the festival fast becomes a key event of summer in the local area.

Alongside cultural festivals, ACAA has hosted conferences and panel discussions addressing humanitarian issues in Afghanistan, refugee resettlement, and the experiences of Afghan communities in the United Kingdom. Following the Taliban takeover of Afghanistan in 2021, the organisation hosted discussions involving refugees, community representatives, and policymakers on the humanitarian and social impacts of the crisis.

== Previous work in Afghanistan ==
=== Citizens advice centres in Kabul and Pul-e-Khumri ===
With funding from the UK Department for International Development, the ACAA launched citizens advice centres in Kabul and Pul-e-Khumri in 2013 to provide free, impartial, and confidential legal advice to the local community. The centre in Kabul focuses on employment counselling and women's legal advice, whilst the centre in Pul-e-Khumri focuses on providing lessons in computer technology, English and with numerous other life skills. The ACAA also worked with the Canadian embassy on a gender equality project with three bases, in Kabul, Balkh and Paktia. The organisation aims to reopen these two centres, though their work is currently suspended.
