= Zambar, Afghanistan =

Village in Khost Province, Afghanistan

Zambar
- Village
- Location in Afghanistan
- Coordinates: 33°33′59″N 69°52′43″E
- Country: Afghanistan
- Province: Khost Province
- District: Sabari District
- Time zone: UTC+6.30 (MST)

Zambar (Pashto: زمبر) is a village in Sabari District of northern Khost Province of southeastern Afghanistan, although it appears to have formerly been in neighboring Paktia Province. It is located roughly 30 miles (48 km) north as the crow flies of the city of Khost but much further by road, and about the same distance from the Pakistani border. The Zambar Toy flows past the village.

Abbas Khan, said to be the strongest Hazbi Islami leader in the district and Also Governor of Hazbi Islami for khost province, hails from Zambar. In the 1980s, Zambar became a stronghold for the Haqqanis. It was reported on 10 January 2008 that a compound in Zambar was searched by ISAF forces and several AK-47s were recovered. Several suspected militants were detained. The search came as ISAF forces attempted to find a reputed Haqqani commander believed to be in the area. On January 18, 2011 members of 2nd Platoon, Company B, 1st Battalion, 187th Infantry Regiment were sent to Zambar and locals were questioned about an improvised explosive device.

== See also ==
- Khost Province
