= Mandozayi District =

District in the central part of Khost Province, Afghanistan

Ismail khel and Mandozi District (Pashto: اسماعیل خېلو او مندوزیو ولسوالۍ, ) also known as Ismail Khel (Pashto: اسماعيل خېل), is situated in the central part of Khost Province, Afghanistan. It borders Nadir Shah Kot District to the north and west, Khost (Matun) District to the east, Gurbuz District to the southwest and Tani District to the south. The population is 50,000 (2006). The district center is the village of Dadwal.

On 23 November 2009, according to the Afghan Ministry of Interior, four people, including two women were killed when gunmen opened fire on their vehicle returning home to Khost city.
