= Tani District =

District of Khost Province, Afghanistan

Coordinates: 33.2407°N 69.8273°E

Tani District (Pashto: تڼي ولسوالۍ) is situated in the southern part of Khost Province, Afghanistan. Where most of Shitakzai Taniwal or Tani live. It borders Spera District to the west, Nadir Shah Kot and Mando Zayi to the north, Gurbuz District to the east and Pakistan to the south. The population is 52,800 (2006) people. The district center is the village of Tani, situated in the northeastern part of the district.

Taniwal or Tani tribe of Shitak or Shitakzai is settled here. Shitak (Tani) is the Brother Tribe of Shitakzai (Bannuchi now live in Bannu & Dawar or Dour of Tochi Valley Waziristan) The language spoken in Taniwal or Tani District is Pashto language close relation with Dawari or Baniswola Pashto.
