= Tirazayi District =

District in Afghanistan

Tirazayi or Tere Zayi (Pashto: تېره زي ) is one of the districts of Khost Province, Afghanistan. It is situated in the northeast of the province. It borders Khost and Sabari districts to the west, Bak District to the north and Pakistan to the east. The population is 49,617. The district center is Aliser, located in the western part of the district.
