= Zarlasht Halaimzai =

Afghan–British human rights activist (born 1981)

- Born: 1981 (age 44–45); Kabul, Democratic Republic of Afghanistan
- Citizenship: Afghanistan; United Kingdom (naturalised)
- Education: University of Cambridge (BA); University of Oxford (MA)
- Occupations: Human rights activist Psychologist
- Years active: 2015–present
- Employer: Amna
- Known for: Providing therapeutic support to refugees
- Honours: BBC 100 Women (2021)

Zarlasht Halaimzai (born 1981) is an Afghan-British human rights activist. She became a refugee as a child when her family fled Afghanistan following the outbreak of the Afghan Civil War in 1992, eventually settling in the United Kingdom. In 2016, Halaimzai co-founded Amna, a non-governmental organisation providing emotional and psychological support to refugees. For her activism, she was named as one of the BBC 100 Women in 2021.

== Biography ==
Halaimzai was born and raised in Kabul; her father was a civil servant and her mother was a teacher.

In 1992, following the withdrawal of American soldiers from Afghanistan and the explosion of a bomb close to their home, Halaimzai and her family became among 500, 000 people who fled Kabul in the first four months of the civil war. The family walked to the city of Mazar-i-Sharif before crossing the border into Uzbekistan, where they lived for four years. In 1996 Halaimzai, her mother and two of her brothers travelled to the United Kingdom to seek asylum, where they were initially placed in a shelter for vulnerable families in London. The family eventually became naturalised citizens of the United Kingdom and settled in West Ham. Halaimzai reported experiencing racism from some of her neighbours and experiencing depression for around five years after moving to the country.

Halaimzai studied child and adolescent psychotherapeutic counselling at the University of Cambridge before going on to obtain a master's degree in mindfulness-based cognitive behavioural therapy from the University of Oxford.

== Activism ==
Halaimzai completed teacher training at a refugee camp on the Syria–Turkey border, providing education and welfare services to families living there. In 2015, following a significant increase in refugees arriving in Greece, Halaimzai travelled there in order to provide therapeutic support; she went on to co-found the Refugee Trauma Initiative, later renamed Amna. For a time, it was the only organisation providing emotional and psychological support to Syrian refugees in northern Greece. It has since expanded its reach, providing support to refugees in Albania, Kosovo and Italy, in addition to working with Ukrainian refugees in Poland and Moldova.

Halaimzai has written about the experiences of refugees and refugee rights for media outlets including The Guardian, The Washington Post, El Diario, Vogue and The Independent.

In 2018, Halaimzai was named as one of the first Obama Foundation Fellows. In 2021, the BBC named Halaimzai as of the 100 most inspiring women of the year.

In 2021, Halaimzai featured in a video made by Led by Donkeys and screened outside the Home Office in which she appealed to Priti Patel to help the people of Afghanistan following the Taliban takeover.
