= Cranford Community College =

Location
- High Street; Hounslow, London, TW5 9PD; England; 51.4877°N 0.4052°W

Information
- Type: Academy
- Department for Education URN: 136522 Tables
- Ofsted: Reports
- Executive headteacher: Kevin Prunty
- Headteacher: Rita Berndt, Robert Ind
- Gender: Mixed
- Age: 11 to 19
- Enrolment: 1432
- Head boy: Angat Thakure
- Head girl: Angeli Khattkar
- Deputies: Gurnur Kaur, Zakariye Galadid, Matthew Morris and Zainab Sarwar
- Website: www.cranford.hounslow.sch.uk

Cranford Community College is a secondary school with academy status in the London Borough of Hounslow, England.

== History ==
The school first opened as Woodfield Secondary School. After the Education Act 1944, Spring Grove Central School and the council senior schools became secondary modern schools. The Hounslow Heath secondary school was closed and its buildings were transferred to the neighbouring primary school when the Woodfield secondary modern school was opened in 1954 at the Great South West Road. Cranford Community College was officially opened in 1975.

== COVID-19 ==
In 2020 and 2021, examinations were cancelled in favour of teacher predicted grades (due to the COVID-19 pandemic). Grading was assessed using a combination of mock exams and classroom performance.

In 2021, some of the A-Level Mathematics and Science mock exams and grade data were leaked, and were able to be accessed by students. Fortunately, this was resolved when teachers discovered students accessing these materials.

== Facilities ==
Two purpose built study centres with 150 computers and additional learning resources available from 8.15am to 5.00pm are available at Cranford Community College. Year 12 have their own study centre and study centre manager who is available to help students with their research, learning, UCAS, Higher Education and employment applications. The sports facilities, drama studios, music practice rooms, dining hall, and media room are also available for use.

== Use in television ==
In 2014, Cranford Community College was a filming location for the British TV series PREMature. The school in the series goes by the fictional name Karl M. Community College. It is the first drama series to be filmed at the school.
