= Khost rebellion =

Khost rebellion may refer to:

- Khost rebellion (1856–1857)
- Khost rebellion (1912)
- Khost rebellion (1924–1925)
