= Musakhel, Khost =

Location in Khost Province, Afghanistan

Musakhel
- Location in Afghanistan
- Coordinates: 33°32′0″N 69°44′0″E
- Country: Afghanistan
- Province: Khost Province
- District: Musakhel District
- Elevation: 6,020 ft (1,835 m)
- Time zone: UTC+4:30

Musakhel (Pashto: موسی خیل) is a village and the center of Musakhel District, Khost Province, Afghanistan. It is located at 33.5333°N 69.7333°E at 1835 m altitude. The town is located within the heartland of the Ahmadzai tribe of Ghilji Pashtuns.

== See also ==
- Khost Province
