= Shabnam Nasimi =

British-Afghan social activist, political commentator (born 1991)

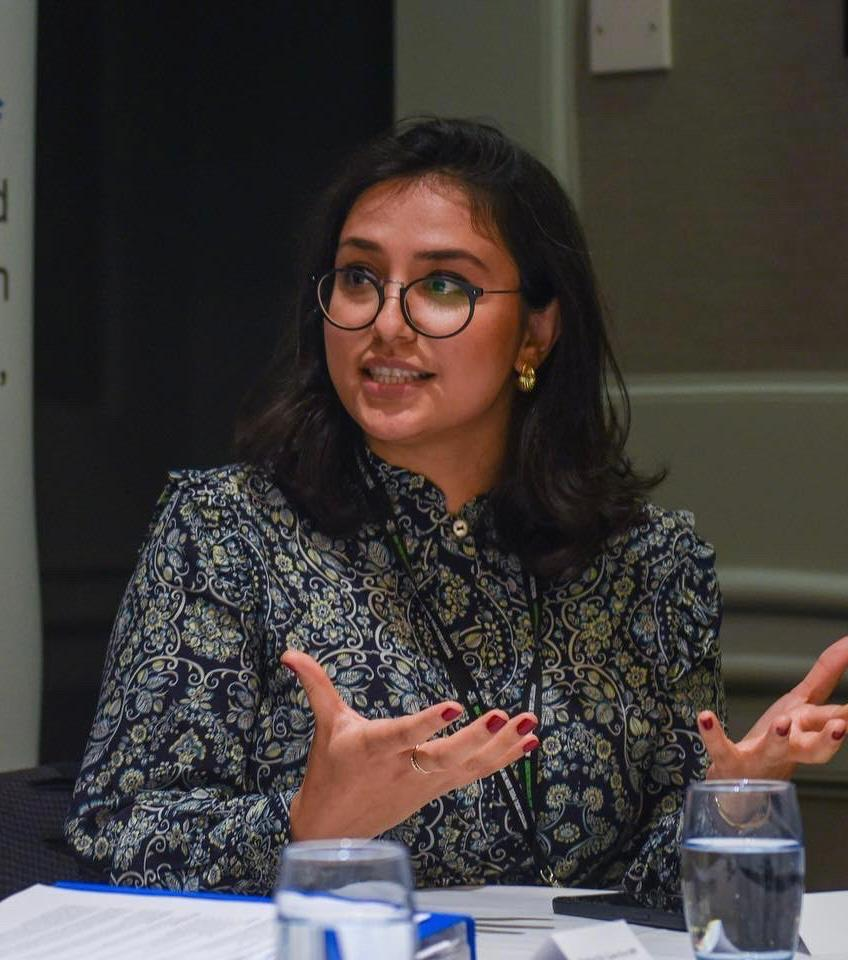
- Nasimi in 2022
- Pronunciation: [ʃäbnám näsíːmíː]
- Born: February 16, 1991 (age 35); Baku, Azerbaijan Soviet Socialist Republic, USSR
- Education: University of Law
- Alma mater: Open University; Birkbeck, University of London
- Website: shabnamnasimi.co.uk

Shabnam Nasimi (Note: Dari pronunciation: [ʃäbnám näsíːmíː].) (Dari: شبنم نسیمی, pronounced [ʃäbnám näsíːmíː]; born 16 February 1991) is a British-Afghan writer, broadcaster and content creator. She has over 600,000 followers across social media, where she shares educational videos about history, culture, art and politics. She was previously Special Advisor to the Minister for Afghan Resettlement, and she co-founded the Friends of Afghan Women Network.

== Early life and education ==
Nasimi was born in Baku, Azerbaijan. She spent her early childhood in Ukraine, and her family fled Afghanistan in 1999, settling in South London as refugees. Her father, Nooralhaq Nasimi, founded the Afghanistan & Central Asian Association (ACAA) and was appointed MBE in 2022 for services to refugees.

Nasimi was educated at St Saviour's and St Olave's Church of England School before pursuing a Law degree at the Open University and completing an MSc in Global Governance and International Security at Birkbeck, University of London.

== Career and public work ==
=== Government career ===
In November 2021 Nasimi was appointed to advise the Minister for Afghan Resettlement, Victoria Atkins, and later the Minister for Refugees in February 2022. . In this role, she supported 'Operation Warm Welcome', the UK’s initiative to integrate Afghans resettled after the Taliban's return to power.

=== Advocacy ===
In August 2021, after the Taliban takeover of Afghanistan, that year's Afghan Chevening scholars were told their places at UK universities would be deferred. Nasimi led a campaign calling on the government to bring them to the UK. Prime Minister Boris Johnson then intervened to prioritise their visas, and 30 scholars and their families were evacuated, arriving in London and Birmingham on 24 August 2021.

In 2024, she co-founded the Friends of Afghan Women Network (FAWN) with journalist Sarah Sands, holding the role of CEO. FAWN campaigns for the rights of Afghan women and girls under Taliban rule.

=== Media and writing career ===
Nasimi writes for The Independent. She has also written for The Times, The Telegraph, the Financial Times and Foreign Policy, and has appeared on BBC News, ITV News and Channel 4 News.

Under the name "Talks with Shabnam," she makes educational videos on Instagram, TikTok and YouTube about history, culture, art and politics. She has worked with the British Museum on content about its collections, and she produces video news pieces for South Era Network as a journalist.

== Honours and awards ==
In 2022, Nasimi was named in the Women in Westminster: The 100 – Ones to Watch list. In 2019, she was shortlisted as one of the BBC's 100 Women.

== Political views and activity ==
In the May 2021 local elections, Nasimi stood as the Conservative Party candidate for Cranford ward in the London Borough of Hounslow. She received 1,191 votes, finishing second out of five candidates.

She publicly endorsed Boris Johnson during the 2019 Conservative Party leadership election.

She has spoken in support of the United Kingdom’s withdrawal from the EU and has publicly stated that she voted for Brexit.
