= Volgograd State Technical University =

Public university in Russia

- Волгоградский государственный технический университет
- Type: public
- Established: 1930
- Location: Volgograd, Russia
- Campus: urban
- Language: Russian

University rankings

Regional – Overall
- QS Emerging Europe and Central Asia: 301-350 (2022)

Volgograd State Technical University (Russian: Волгоградский государственный технический университет) is a public university located in Volgograd, Russia. It was founded in 1930.

== History ==
The University was founded in 1930 in accordance with the decree of the Council of People's Commissars of the USSR of December 11, 1929, in connection with the construction of the Stalingrad Tractor Plant. The solemn opening of the institute took place on May 31, 1930. On July 23, 1930, the Central Executive Committee and the Council of People's Commissars of the USSR issued a decree renaming the institute into Stalingrad Tractor Institute.

During World War II, the university was evacuated to Chelyabinsk, where it was the basis for the existing to this day Chelyabinsk Mechanical and Mechanical Engineering Institute. In 1943, the institute returned to Volgograd and work began to restore the destroyed buildings of the institute. In 1944, the institute again began to accept students.

In 1947 the Council of Ministers of the USSR issued a decree to rename (reorganize) the Institute into the Stalingrad Institute of Agricultural Engineering. In 1968 the computing center of the institute was founded. In 1976, he opened the Faculty of Motor Transport (FAT). In 1980 the Institute was awarded with the Order of the Red Banner of Labour for the training of highly skilled specialists and development of science.

In 1993 there was an order of the State Committee of the Russian Federation for Higher Education renaming the Volgograd Polytechnic Institute into the Volgograd State Technical University.

In 2020 the university celebrated its 90th anniversary. Over the years the university has trained more than 200 thousand specialists.

The structure of the university has 13 faculties, including 10 full-time and 3 part-time and correspondence courses. The university also includes 4 branches: Volzhsky Polytechnic Institute (VPI), Kamyshinsky Technological Institute (KTI), Sebryakovsky branch (SF) and Volzhsky Scientific and Technical Complex (VNTK).

The university has its own research center with pilot production - the university technopark, which solves complex science-intensive technical problems in the creation of new materials, demanded by leading enterprises of defense, nuclear, aviation, metallurgical, chemical and other industries.

The university is a training center for foreign students from many countries of Europe, Asia, Africa, Middle East, Latin America. Graduates of the university work in more than 80 countries of the world. As of the beginning of 2022, there were about 1,000 foreigners studying here.

== Structure ==
- Faculty of Automated Systems, Transport and Armaments
- Faculty of automobile transport
- Faculty of Structural Materials Technology
- Faculty of Food Technology
- Faculty of Electronics and Computer Engineering
- Faculty of Economics and Management
- Faculty of Chemical Technology
- Institute of Architecture and Construction
- Faculty of Architecture and Urban Development
- Faculty of Construction and Housing and Communal Services
- Faculty of transport, engineering systems and techno-sphere safety
- Faculty for the training of foreign specialists
- Faculty of pre-university training
