= Musakhel District, Afghanistan =

Part of the province of Khost, Afghanistan

Musakhel District (Pashto: موسی خېل ولسوالۍ) is situated in the northern part of the Khost Province, Afghanistan. The district is within the heartland of the Ahmadzai tribe of Ghilji Pashtuns. It borders with Paktia Province to the north, Sabari District to the east, Khost (Matun) District to the south, Nadir Shah Kot District to the southwest and Qalandar District to the west. The population is 36,300 (2006). The district center is the village of Musakhel in the northern part of the district.
