= Khost Province =

Province of Afghanistan

Khost خوست
- Province
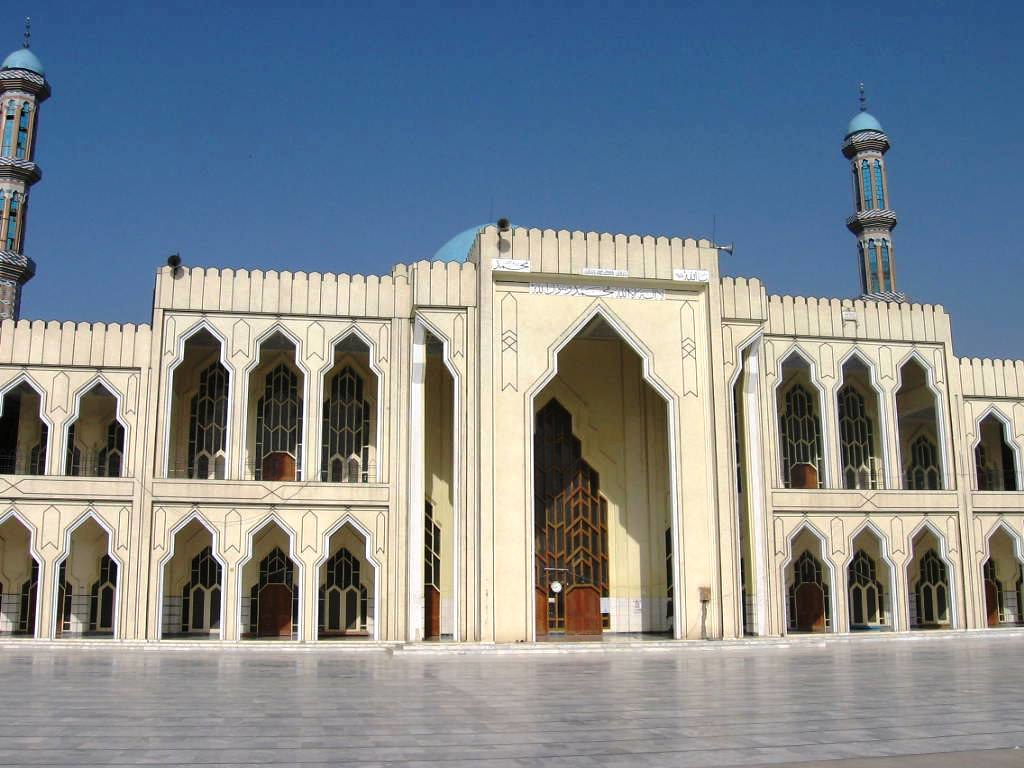
- The Khost Mosque in Khost, the capital of Khost Province.

- Map of Afghanistan with Khost highlighted
- Country: Afghanistan
- Established: 1986 (de facto)
- Capital: Khost
- Districts: 13

Government
  - Governor: Mohammad Nabi Omari
  - Deputy Governor: Mohammad Din Shah Mohabat
  - Police Chief: Maulvi Mehboob Shah Qanat

Area
  - Total: 4,235 km^{2} (1,635 sq mi)

Population (2021)
  - Total: 647,730
  - Rank: 16th
  - Density: 152.9/km^{2} (396.1/sq mi)
- Time zone: UTC+4:30 (Afghanistan Time)
- Postal code: 25xx
- Area code: AF-KHO
- Main languages: Pashto
- HDI (2019): 0.506 low · 3rd

Khost (Pashto (Note: Pashto pronunciation: [xost̪]), Dari (Note: Dari pronunciation: [xoːst̪]): خوست), is one of the 34 provinces of Afghanistan located in the southeastern part of the country. Khost consists of thirteen districts and the city of Khost serves as the capital of the province. Historically, Khost used to be a part of Paktia and a larger region surrounding Khost is still referred to as Loya Paktia.

Throughout history, the province has been the site for numerous rebellions, leading to the local Pashtun populace to consider themselves the "traditional king-makers in Kabul". The province was previously known as the Southern province and was united with the neighbouring Paktia province. Khost is also home to numerous universities, including Shaikh Zayed University, which is the only university in Afghanistan with a faculty in computer science.

As of 2021, it was estimated that the population of the province stood at 647,730, which makes it the 16th most populated province in Afghanistan.

Khost International Airport began providing the province with international flights after it was inaugurated by the former president Ashraf Ghani on July 10, 2021.

To the east, Khost Province is bordered by the North Waziristan and Kurram districts of Pakistan's Khyber Pakhtunkhwa province. To the north, it is bordered by the Nangarhar. To the south, it is bordered by Paktika. To the west, it is bordered by Paktia.

== History ==
=== Second Anglo-Afghan War ===
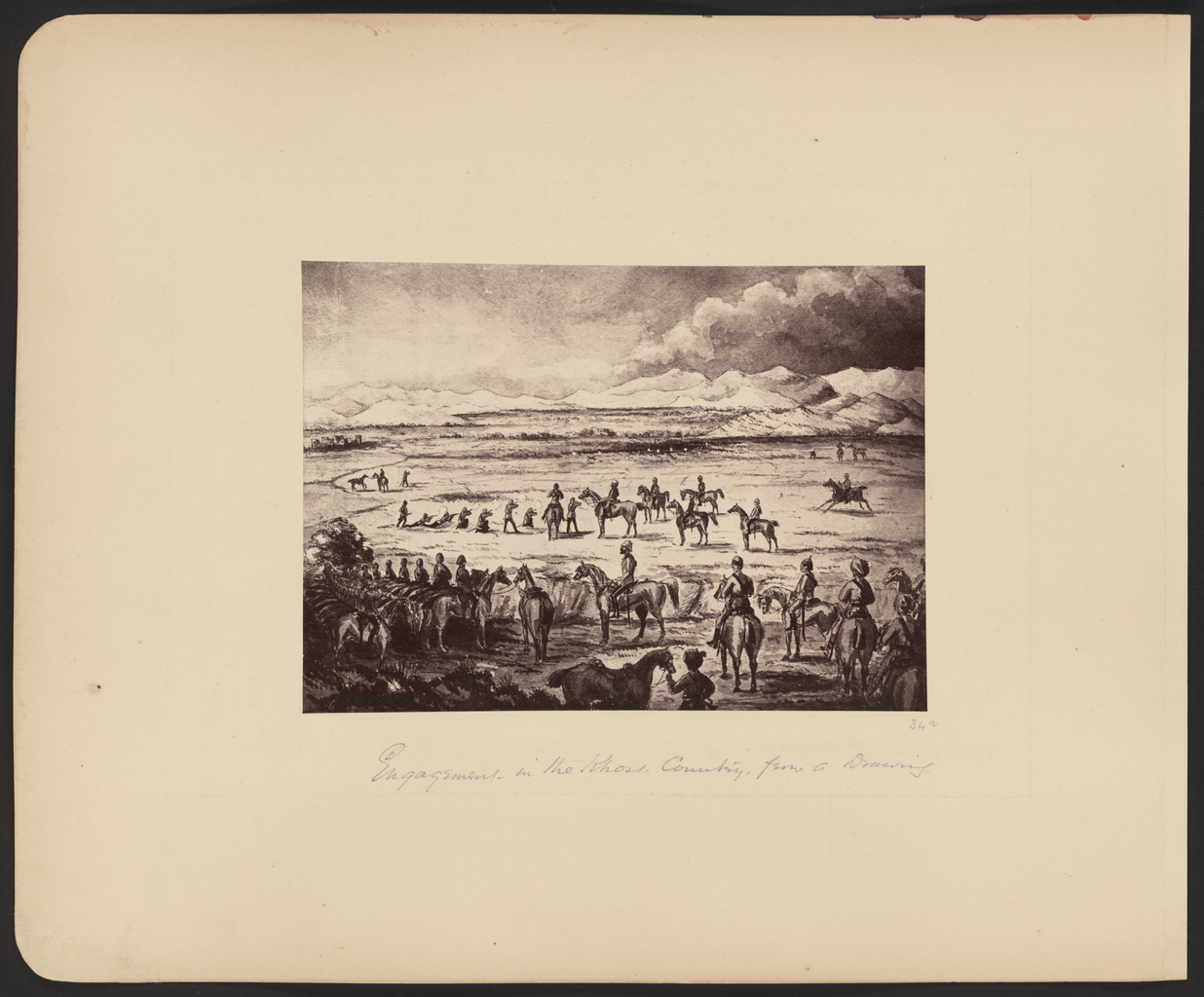
Military engagement near Khost.

During the second Anglo-Afghan War, British forces led by Lord Roberts entered the province. Approximately 8,000 raiders from the Mangal tribe, which had a long tradition of resisting outside control, launched several attacks on weakly protected British supply convoys in Khost Province. In reprisal, Lord Roberts ordered his forces to attack eleven Mangal villages which had launched raids that murdered several camp followers, resulting in them being sacked and burnt. As the news of the reprisals spread over Britain, his political opponents in the British parliament criticized Lord Robert's actions. At the end of the conflict, British forces withdrew from the province.

=== Khost rebellion (1924–1925) ===
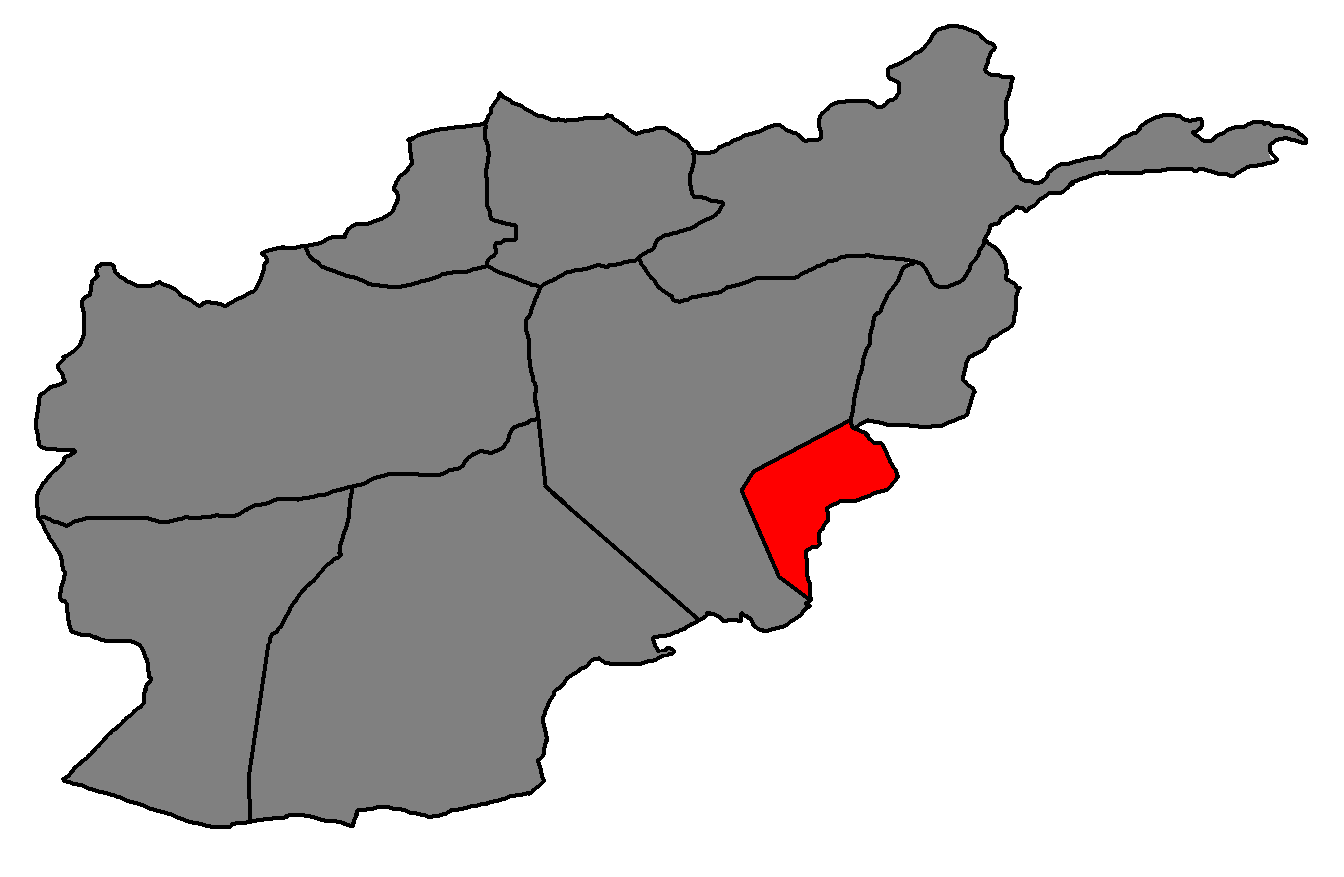
Map of the Southern Province.

In 1924, the province of Khost, then known as the Southern province, was the site of a rebellion against Emir Amanullah Khan by the Mangal tribe. The rebellion began in March 1924 when Mulla Abd Allah accused a local official of violating Sharia by forbidding a marriage in accordance with a new family law as the father of the bride in question had pledged her to another man whilst she was an infant. As a result, Mulla Abd Allah issued a fatwa against Amanullah Khan, condemning him as a kafir(infidel) and launching Jihad after a failed attempt was made by mediators to justify the new laws. The rebels were soon joined by the son of the former king Yaqub Khan, Abd-al Karim, who managed to escape British surveillance and moved to Khost, where he was crowned king by the rebels. Rebel forces then conquered the city of Gardez, which is adjacent to Khost. By late July, the rebels had captured Hisarak, which was 12 kilometres far from the capital, Kabul. However, the rebels didn't try to seize the capital and instead returned to Khost, taking the spoils of war with them.

The Deobandi-trained council of 'ulama' issued a fatwa denouncing Mulla Abd Allah as a rebel and began to provide Amanullah Khan with levies after he allowed them to alter the constitution so that it would align with their interpretation of Sharia. In August, Shah Wali Khan attacked the rebels in Logar whilst the Afghan Air Force were simultaneously bombing rebel positions. By early October, government forces had regained possession of the city of Gardez. Two months later, tribal leaders from Khost travelled to Kabul with the aim of initiating a peace process, only to be thrown in jail. Mulla Abd Allah, along with his three sons, were eventually captured and executed, and the rebellion was quelled in January 1925. Shah Wali Khan burned and looted more than 300 homes in Khost and brought 600 female captives back with him to Kabul, where they were distributed amongst the Mohammadzais as war booty. In the aftermath of the government's victory, Amanullah Khan decided to construct a victory pillar in Kabul to commemorate his vanquishing of the rebels. The new pillar was meant to demonstrate the "triumph of knowledge over ignorance".

=== Soviet–Afghan War ===
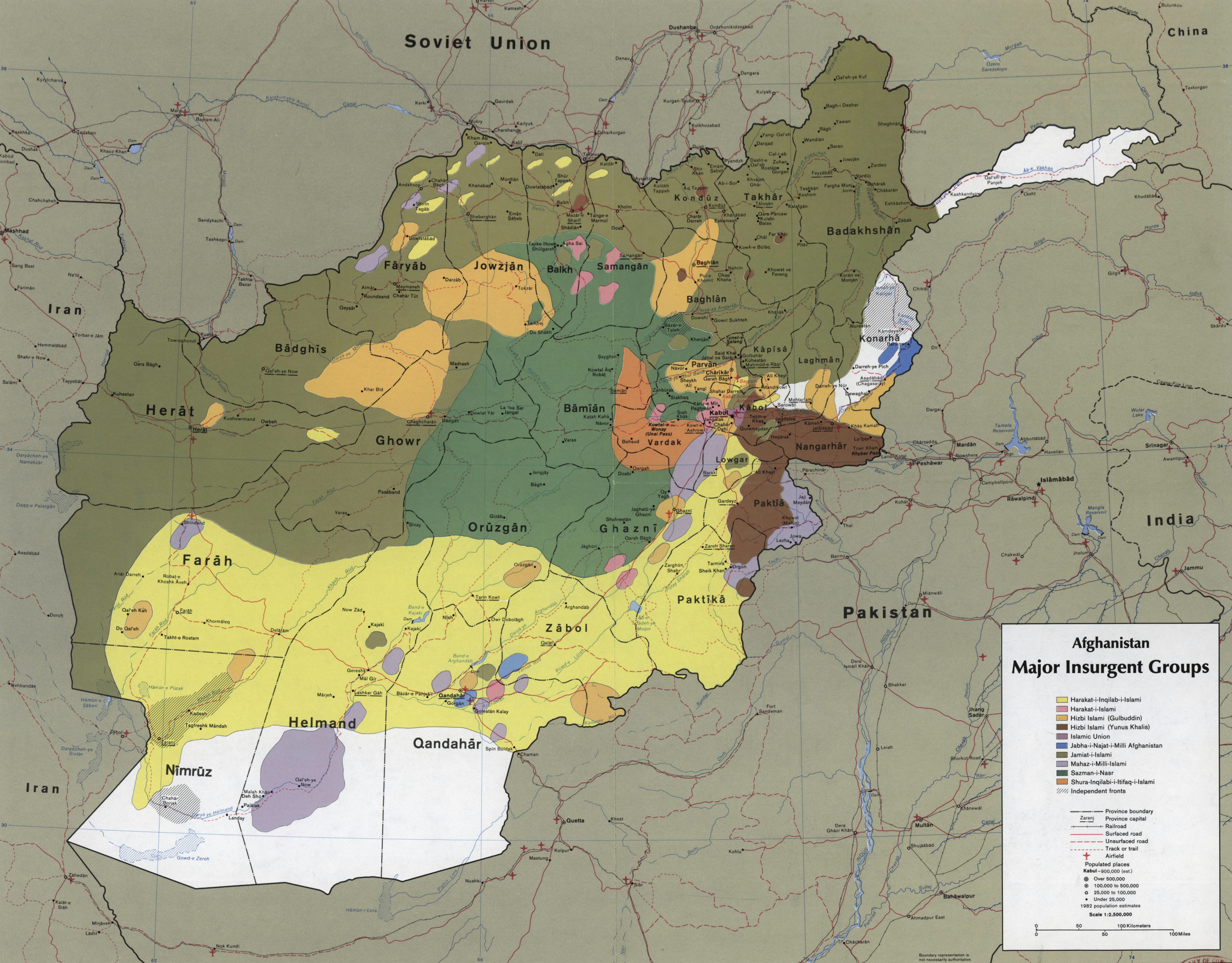
Map of the Mujahideen in 1985.

In April 1978, the Communist People's Democratic Party of Afghanistan staged a coup d'état against the then president Mohammed Daoud Khan, ending the Republic of Afghanistan and establishing the Democratic Republic of Afghanistan under the rule of Nur Muhammad Taraki, who would later be overthrown and killed by Hafizullah Amin in 1979. The coup is also known as the Saur Revolution. In late 1978, a rebellion occurred in the remote region of Nuristan, but it didn't spread to the other parts of the country due to its isolation. The new communist government strived to eliminate illiteracy and implement agrarian reforms by sending literacy campaigners and agrarian reformers to various provinces, including Khost. Following a rebellion by the Zadran tribe, a Pashtun tribe native to Loya Paktia, president Hafizullah Amin decided to launch a full scale military operation in Paktia. The operation was a "crushing defeat" and it, alongside the ousting of former President Taraki, was one of the reasons why the Soviets decided to intervene in December 1979, thus starting the Soviet–Afghan War.

At the end of July 1983, the forces of Jalaluddin Haqqani laid siege to two towns in Khost and the Tani, Mangal, Zazai and Waziri tribes began taking an active part in the fighting, despite being passive up until then. All of the aforementioned events coincided with the appeal of former King Mohammed Zahir Shah for a united front, which caused rumours about the Royalists intending to establish a provisional government in a liberated Khost. However, Khost wasn't captured and by October, the Tani tribe had withdrawn from coalition due to a tribal rivalry with the Zadran. Many rebels also returned home as winter came on. By the end of December, government forces arriving from Gardez ended the siege of the two towns and recaputered Zazi Maidan.

Khost was considered a "bastion of the regime" during the Soviet–Afghan War and its loyalty to the Democratic Republic of Afghanistan allowed it to be granted a de facto provincial status in 1986. This provided the province with a force of paid provincial staff and an annual budget that was separate from the neighbouring provinces. Khost was upgraded from a Loy Wuluswali (within Paktia) to a full province in 1985.

=== 1993-present ===
Khost Province saw the Battles of Zhawar and part of Operation Infinite Reach. Khost Province was captured by the Taliban during the 2021 Taliban offensive on August 15, 2021.

On 16 April 2022, Pakistani airstrikes targeted several villages in Spera District, including Afghan-Dubai, Pasa Mela, Mir Sapar, Mandata, and Kanai, and struck refugee camps belonging to internally displaced persons from Waziristan, killing at least 41 people, mainly women and children, and wounding 22 others, according to the Taliban interim government. Pakistan claimed it struck TTP camps.

On 22 June 2022, a magnitude 5.9 earthquake struck the province. In Spera District, approximately 500 homes were destroyed, and 40 people were killed, with 95 others injured. Many houses constructed primarily of mud and wood were razed to the ground. Heavy rain and the earthquake contributed to landslides that destroyed entire hamlets.

== Geography ==
Khost Province is traversed by the Kurram River, which rises from the Rokian Defile, passes through the district, and then enters the "country of the Turis or the Kurram Valley".

== Administrative divisions ==
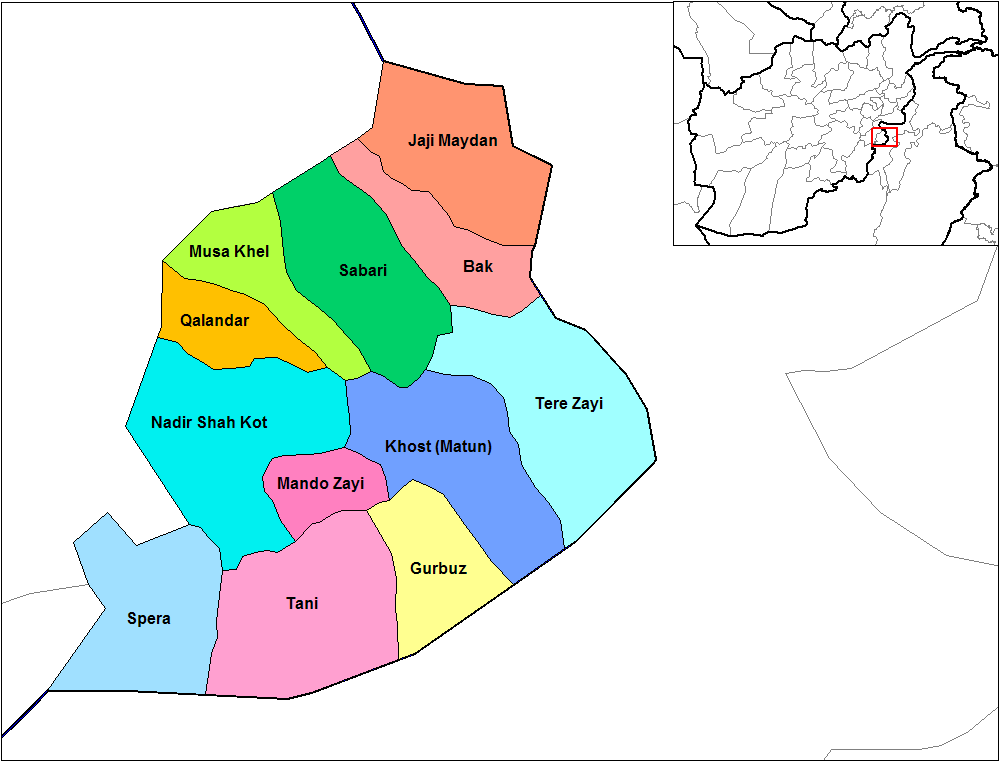
Map of the districts of Khost as of January 2004, prior to the redrawing of provincial and district boundaries later that year

Districts of Khost Province
District	Capital	Population	Area in km^{2}	Pop. density	Ethnic groups
Bak		24,977	139	180	>99% Pashtun.
Gurbuz		29,627	379	78	>99% Pashtun.
Jaji Maydan		27,236	331	82	>99% Pashtun.
Khost	Khost	156,106	418	373	Predominantly Pashtun, few Tajiks.
Mandozayi		63,772	128	498	>99% Pashtun.
Musa Khel		46,368	470	99	>99% Pashtun.
Nadir Shah Kot		36,005	381	94	>99% Pashtun.
Qalandar		11,559	100	116	>99% Pashtun.
Sabari		80,114	259	310	>99% Pashtun.
Shamal		15,411	169	91	>99% Pashtun.
Spera		27,501	499	55	>99% Pashtun.
Tani		67,360	410	164	>99% Pashtun.
Tirazayi		50,486	427	118	>99% Pashtun.
Khost		636,522	4,235	150	99.8% Pashtuns, 0.2% Tajiks. (Note: Note: "Predominantely" or "dominated" is interpreted as 99%, "majority" as 70%, "mixed" as 1/(number of ethnicities), "minority" as 30% and "few" or "some" as 1%.)

== Demographics ==
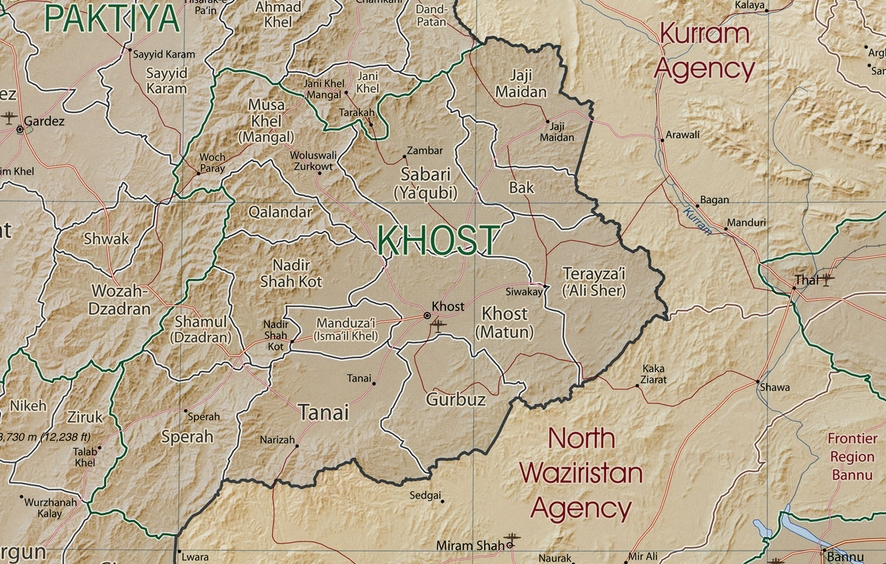
Districts of Khost and surrounding areas.

=== Population ===
As of 2021, the population of the province is around 950,000 people. Other sources put the number at over a million.

=== Ethnicity, languages and religion ===
The Pashtun people make up 99% of the population, with the remaining 1% being Tajiks and others.

Estimated ethnolinguistic and -religious composition
Ethnicity	Pashtun	Tajik/ Farsiwan	Others	Sources
Period	Pashtun	Tajik/ Farsiwan	Others	Sources

2004–2021 (Islamic Republic)	99%	≤1%	<1%
2020 EU	majority	1%	–
2018 UN	overwhelming majority (Note: excl. Kochi.)	small minority	
2017 CSSF (Note: Demographic information is based on data from 2017.)	99%	1%	<1% (Note: incl. Hazara, Uzbek, and Turkmen.)
2015 CP	99%	1%	–
2015 NPS	99%	1%	
2011 PRT	99%	0.2%	–
2011 USA	99%	–	–
2009 ISW	overwhelming majority	small minority	

Legend:
- ∅: Ethnicity mentioned in source but not quantified
- –: Ethnicity not mentioned specifically
- Source abbreviations: Empirical sources: –, Government sources: CP – Colombo Plan, EU – European Union Agency for Asylum, PRT – Provincial Reconstruction Team of the United States government, UN – United Nations Assistance Mission in Afghanistan, Editorial sources: CSSF – Center for the Scientific Study of Families, ISW – Institute for the Study of War, NPS – Naval Postgraduate School, USA – United States Army

=== Education ===
The overall literacy rate (6+ years of age) fell from 28% in 2005 to 15% in 2011. The overall net enrolment rate (6–13 years of age) fell from 38% in 2005 to 37% in 2011.

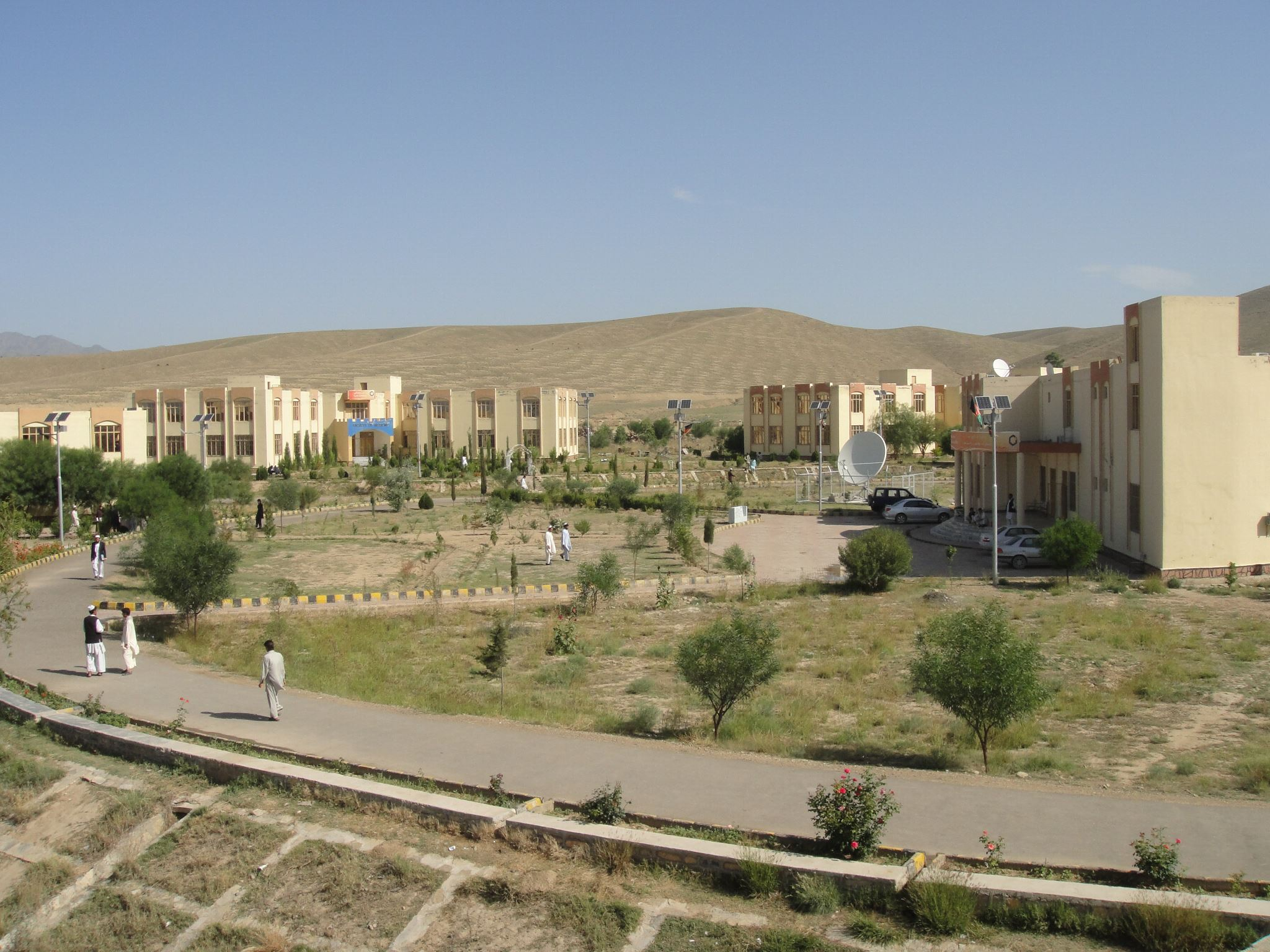
Image of Shaikh Zayed University.

There are multiple universities in Khost, the following list consists of all of the universities that can be found in the province:

- Shaikh Zayed University - Initially opened in Peshawar, Pakistan in 2000, the university was moved to Khost on orders of the former president Hamid Karzai. The university bears the name of the first president of the United Arab Emirates, Zayed bin Sultan Al Nahyan who sponsored the construction of its campus in Khost.
- Pamir University - Situated in the capital of Khost province, the university is a private higher education institute which was inaugurated on April 24, 2011.
- Hara University - Private university that's also situated in the city of Khost.

=== Health ===
The percentage of households with clean drinking water increased from 34% in 2005 to 35% in 2011. The percentage of births attended to by a skilled birth attendant increased from 18% in 2005 to 32% in 2011.

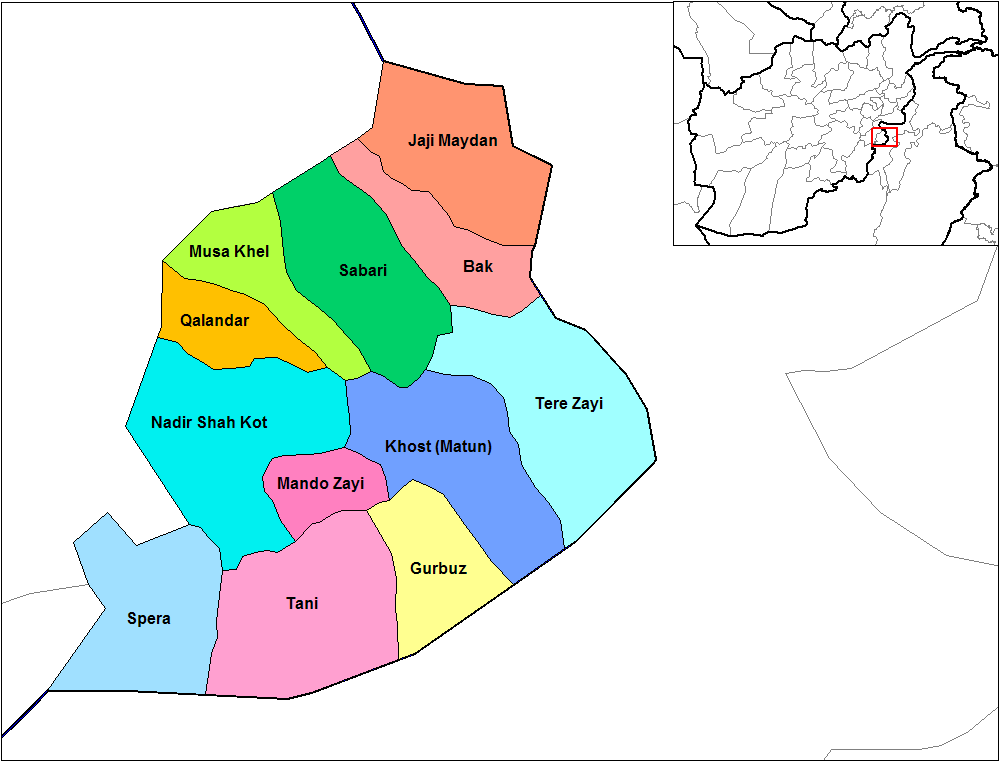
Districts of Khost

== Culture ==
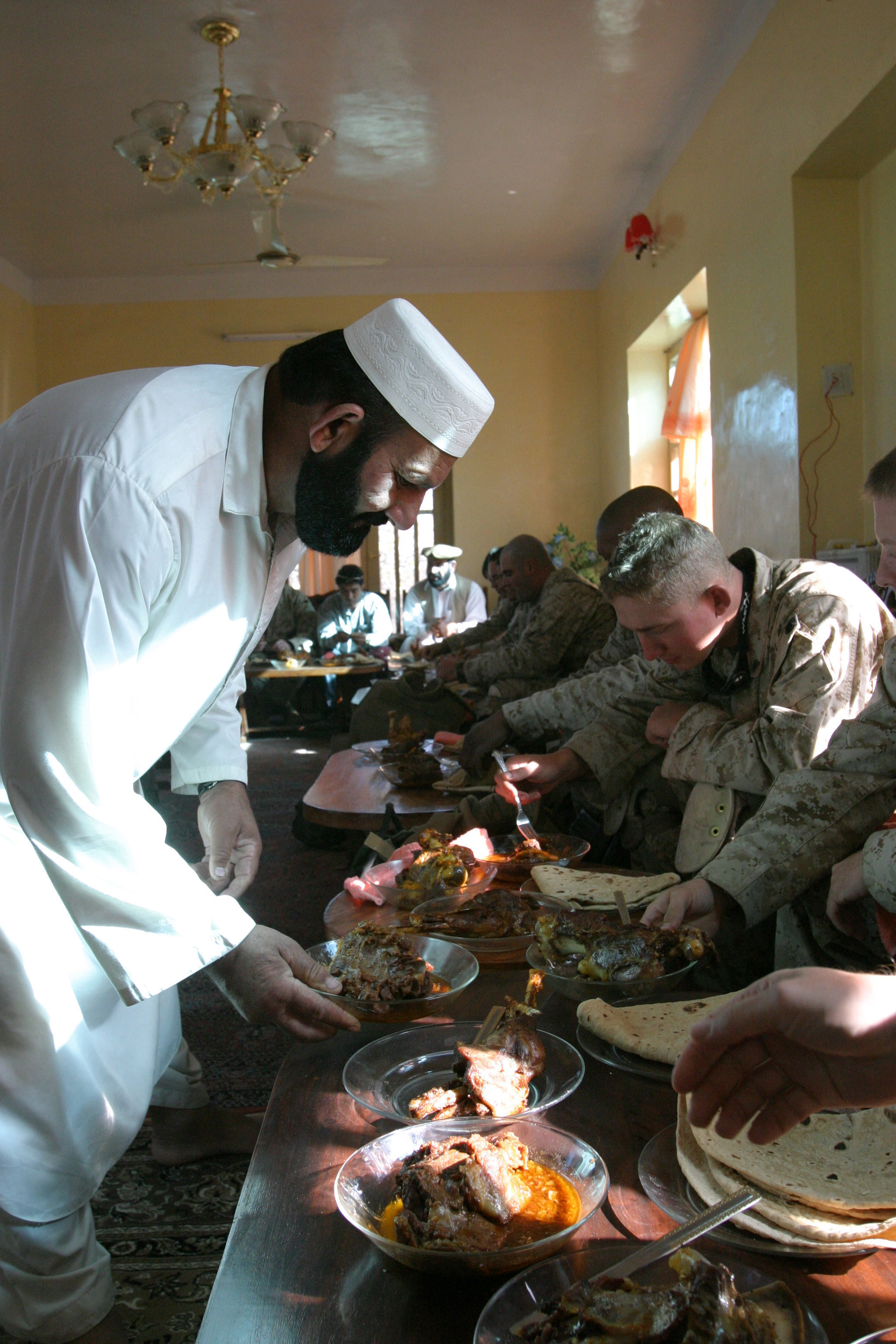
A men from Khost serving lunch to U.S. marines

== Gallery ==
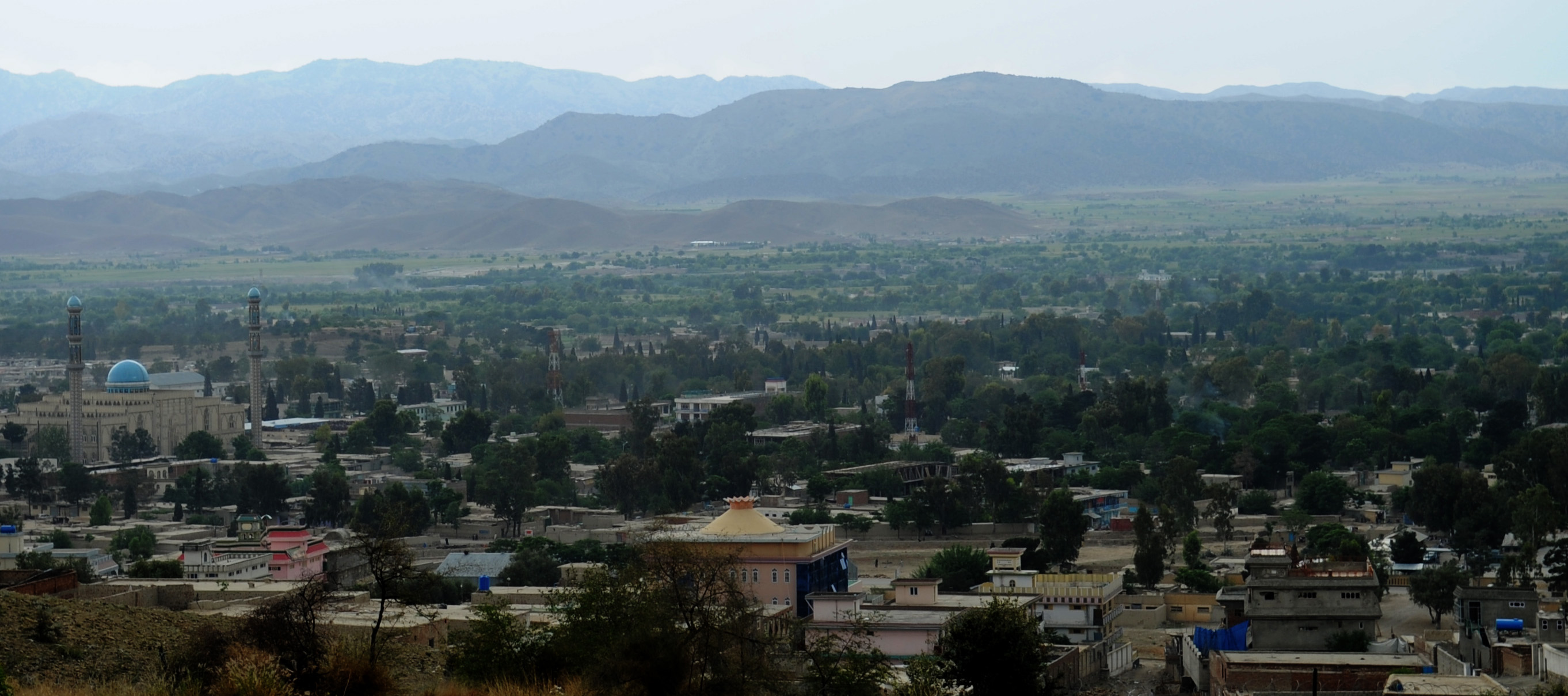
Khost, the capital of Khost province

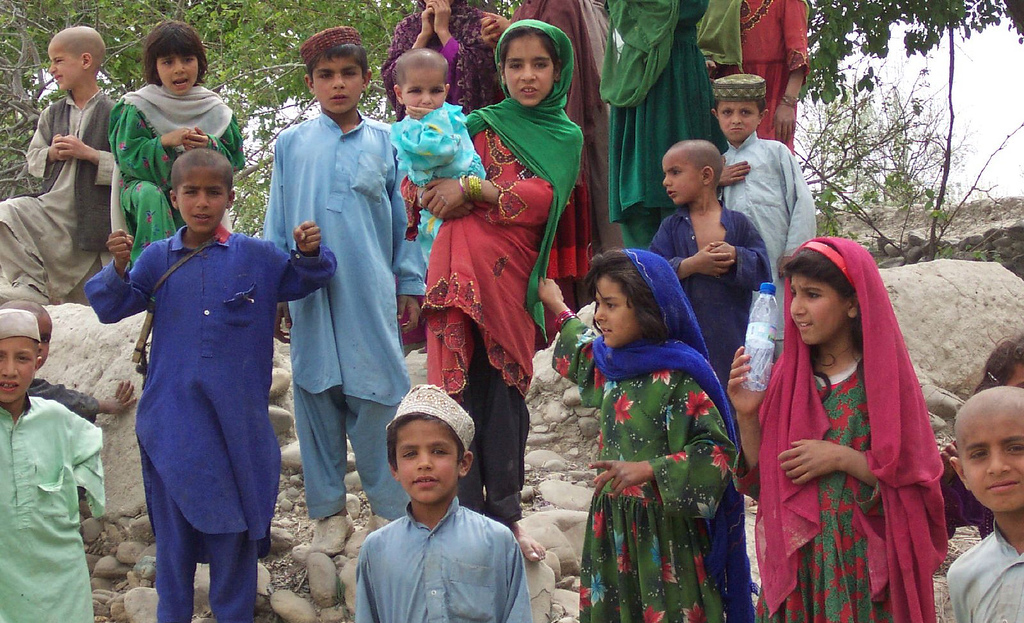
Children in Khost

== See also ==
- Battle for Hill 3234
- Forward Operating Base Chapman attack
- Forward Operating Base Salerno
