= Southern Province, Afghanistan =

Southern Province (Note: see § Designation of the entity.) (1921–1964) حکومت اعلی سمت جنوبی Ḥukumat-i ʿĀlā-yi Samt-i Junūbi (1921 – after 1935) ولایت سمت جنوبی Wilāyat-i Samt-i Junūbi (before 1950–1964)
- High Governorate/Province of Afghanistan (Note: 1921–1926: Emirate of Afghanistan, 1926–1964: Kingdom of Afghanistan)
- 1921–1964
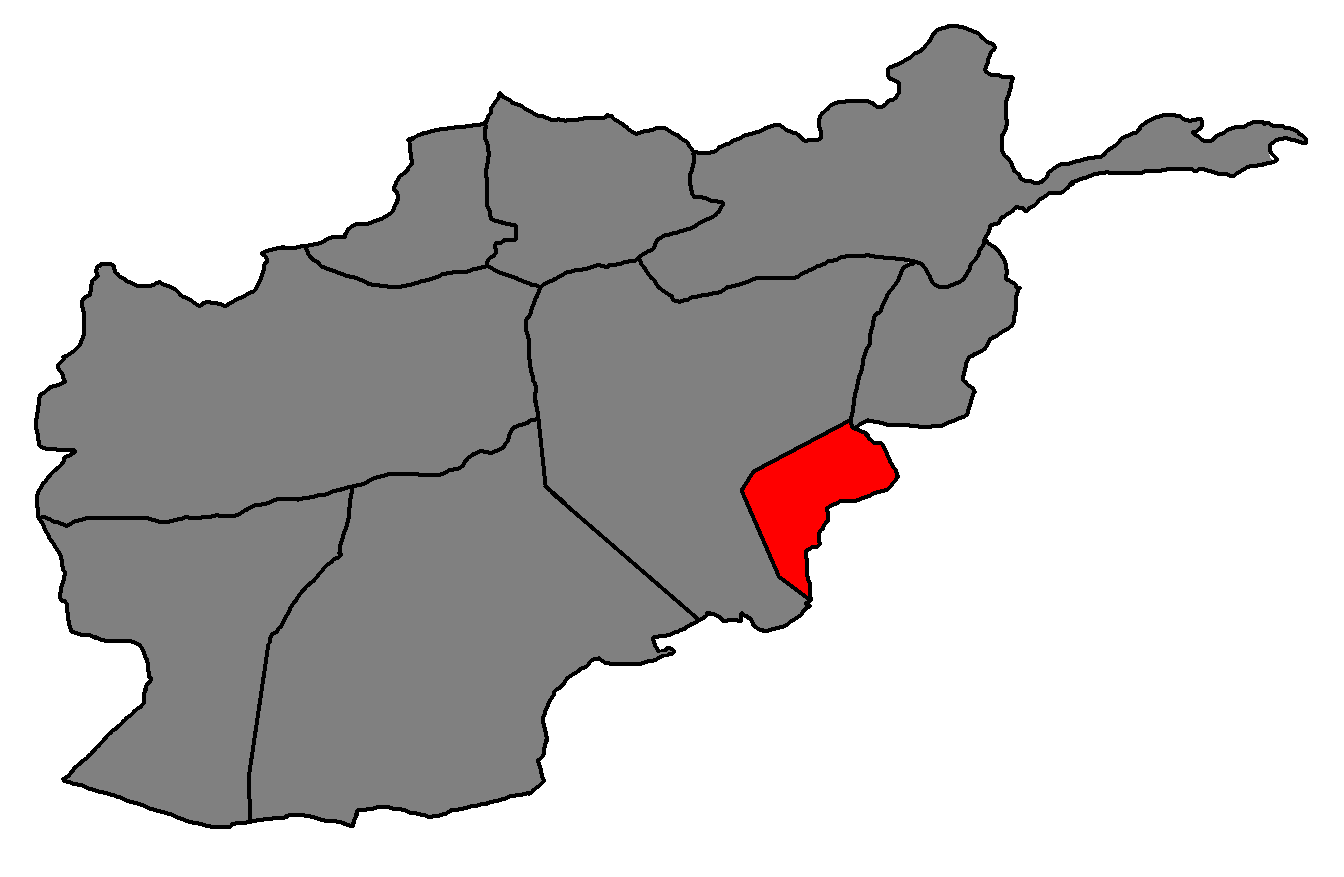
- The Southern Province in 1929
- Capital: Gardez (Note: In 1921, the city of Khost was implicitly described as the main city that the Southern Province was built around (see § Administration).)
- Demonym: Junubi
- Population
  - 1946: c. 882,170
- Government
  - Type: Province
- History
  - Established: 1921
  - Disestablished: 30 April 1964
Preceded by	Succeeded by
1921: Province of Kabul (Districts of Khost, Zurmat and Katawaz)	1964: Province of Paktia
- Today part of: Afghanistan

Southern Province is the conventional English designation for a sub-national entity of Afghanistan that existed between 1921 and 1964, centered around its capital of Gardez. Its designation and administrative status changed during subsequent reforms, and contemporary Afghan and foreign sources used different terms for the entity during its existence (see § Designation of the entity).

The polity was established as part of a major reform of sub-national administration under Emir Amanullah Khan, largely encompassing the Afghan side of the historic region of Loya Paktia which once extended across the Durand Line into areas that are now part of Khyber Pakhtunkhwa, Pakistan. It was dissolved during nationwide administrative reforms in 1964 and was replaced primarily by the Province of Paktia.

== Designation of the entity ==
Under Amanullah Khan's 1300 Hijri (1921/22) territorial regulation, the Afghan state distinguished between provinces (Dari: ولایت, romanized: wilāyat) and high governorates (Dari: حکومت اعلی, romanized: ḥukūmat-i ʿālā) as first-tier units. Under that regulation, the entity was officially designated as Ḥukūmat-i ʿĀlā-yi Samt-i Junūbi (Dari: حکومت اعلی سمت جنوبی, lit. High Governorate of the South). In English-language literature, however, the term ḥukūmat-i ʿālā was often inexactly translated as "minor province", "subprovince", or reduced simply to "province", (Note: Attributed to multiple references:) which blurred the distinction between a proper province and a high governorate. Despite being inaccurate, the name "Southern Province" became the most-used designation used for the entity in historical and cartographic English literature.

With a series of royal decrees and cabinet decisions between 1921 and the 1964 reforms in Afghanistan, the state tried to simplify the existing hierarchy of administrative units. The terminology used by contemporary media reflects this transition. In the 1928 edition of the Statesman's Yearbook, the entity is called the "minor province" of Simat-i-Janubi (Southern Province). According to the same source, between 1935 and 1950, the polity was upgraded to a "major province". The 1952 edition of the Encyclopædia Britannica's World Atlas just calls it the Southern Province. The first edition of Abbas Sahab's Map of Afghanistan, published in 1960, labelled the entity in English as "Southern Province" and in Persian as Iyālat-i Junūbī (Dari: ایالت جنوبی), with the label iyālat also differing from the governmental designation of wilāyat (Dari: ولایت). In the second edition from 1963, the Persian designation was changed to Nāyib al-Ḥukūmah-yi Iyālat-i Junūbī (Dari: نایب الحکومه ایالت جنوبی), implicating that the name of the polity was "Iyālat-i Junūbī" instead of "Junūbī" as before. Mehrdad Izady labels the name of the province as "Paktya" even before the change in administration in 1964.

Some modern sources leave the designation untranslated (or put them next to a rough translation), which leads to differences in transliteration. (Note: Examples include "Hukumat-i Ala", "Hukumat-e Aala Junoobi", and "Hokumat Alla", "Hukumati Ala" or "Hukamati Alla Samti Janub".)

== History ==
In March 1924 it was governed by Amr al-Din. A dispute between him and a local magistrate led to the Khost rebellion, which saw the entire province rise up against King Amanullah. The rebellion lasted until January 1925, and 14,000 people perished as a result of it. In 1944–1947, the province was the scene of revolts by various tribes. As of 1946, it had a population of 882,170. It was dissolved in 1964 to create the Province of Paktia.

== Administration ==
Subdivisions of the Southern Province
Governorate	Sub-Districts	Villages
–	–	–
–	–	Ismail Khel, Bak Mandozahi, Qadam, Lakan, Matun
–	Maidan Khulah and Zarakot (1st)	–
–	Jaji Maidan and Bak (1st)	–
–	Zerok (1st)	–
–	Tanai (1st)	–
Chamkani (2nd)	–	–
Chamkani (2nd)	Laj Mangal (2nd)	–
Chamkani (2nd)	Jaji (1st)	–
Urgun (1st)	–	–
Urgun (1st)	Tangai Jadran (2nd)	–
Urgun (1st)	Wazakhwa (2nd)	–
Urgun (1st)	Yusufkhel Katawaz (2nd)	–
Urgun (1st)	Janikhel (1st)	–
Urgun (1st)	Barmal and Marghah (1st)	–
Gardez (1st)	–	–
Gardez (1st)	Darah-ye Shamal Jadran (2nd)	–
Gardez (1st)	Mirzaka-Totakhil (2nd)	–
Gardez (1st)	Rod-e Ahmadzahi (1st)	–
Gardez (1st)	Zurmat (1st)	–
