= Marwat =

Pashtun tribe

The Marwat (Pashto: مروت) is a Pashtun tribe, a branch of the Lohani tribe and belong to Lodi section. The Marwats were named for their ancestor Marwat Khan Lodi.

== Distribution ==
They are located primarily in Lakki Marwat District, parts of Dera Ismail Khan District, Sara-e-Naurang Tehsil, Bannu District and Tank district in Pakistan, and in the Katawaz area of Paktika, Afghanistan.

== History ==
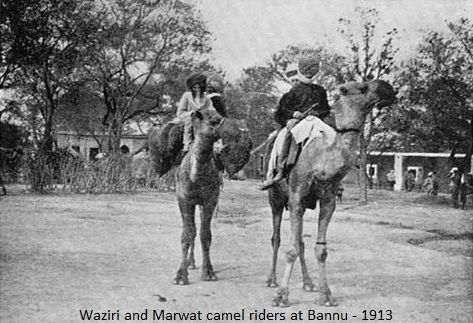
Waziri and Marwat camel riders at Bannu (1913)

See also Bannu

Marwats, as well as other branches of Lohanis, lived in Zarghun Shar (located in the Paktika province) as well as Wana valley of South Waziristan. They had a long-standing dispute with Sulaiman Khels and other Ghilzais, who had already forced other Lodi tribes to migrate en masse to India. In one of the decisive battles, in the mid-15th century, Lohanis were thoroughly defeated by the Ghilzais, and had to leave Katawaz to the latter. Lohanis and their Dotani cousins had to be content with just Wana valley and surroundings.

The Marwat and other Lohanis expanded from Waziristan further east, occupying large tracts of present-day Dera Ismail Khan and Tank, by defeating Prangi, Suri and Sarwani tribes. Marwats stayed in Waziristan while Daulat Khels and Taturs migrated to newly conquered Daman. The headman of Kati Khel (branch of Daulat Khel), then the chief of all Lohanis, agreed to give shares in the income from the lands of Daman to Marwats and Miankhels. In the late 16th century, or in the beginning of the 17th century, Wazirs issued from their homeland Birmal and encroached upon the territories of Marwats in the nowadays South Waziristan (present day abodes of Ahmadzai Wazirs). Wazirs, with the aid of Mehsuds, defeated Marwats and Dotanis, the former were expelled while the latter was allowed to retain some lands in Wana. When the Marwats arrived in Daman to take possession of their lands, the Daulat Khel Lohanis opposed that. In the subsequent battle, the Daulat Khels were defeated by Marwats, and were expelled from Daman. The Daulat Khels sought the help of Gandapurs, Babars and Bhittanis, and this alliance was able to defeat the Marwats.

The defeated Marwats stayed in Dara Pezu and surroundings for some time, until they got the invitation from a section of Niazis, who were settled in present-day Lakki Marwat, to assist them in defeating the rival clan. Marwats turned against the Niazis. The Niazi clan first defeated the Marwat clan against whom they were hired and slaughtered them in great numbers. After the friendship with their brothers Marwats, Niazis fled towards Mianwali. Somewhere between 1601 and 1607, Marwats had taken possession of all the 'Tal' tract.

Marwats were nominally part of Mughal empire. After decline of Mughals, the area came under Durranis. Ahmad Shah Abdali didn't enforce taxes on Marwats but put the condition of providing contingents of Marwat warriors for his military campaigns. In the most important military campaign of Abdali, 120 Marwat horsemen accompanied him under their chief Begu Khan to India. Ahmad Shah's successor, Timur Shah Durrani, enforced Tax on Marwats.

After the battle of Panipat, Marwats split into two factions, White and Black and fought each other for next 60 years. Taking advantage of their internal rift, Wazirs conquered some area from Marwats in the sandy tracts of the present day Bannu district. In 1819, Nawab of Mankera interested in the civil war of Marwats on the invitation of one party and later occupied the area for themselves. The weakened Marwats were unable to resist the occupation and thus Marwats lost the independence. Soon after, Sikhs conquered Lakki Marwat and built a fort on the bank of river Gambila near Present day Lakki city. In 1847 Marwats rose in rebellion against the Sikhs but it was successfully suppressed by the latter. In Anglo-Sikh Wars, Marwats provided great deal of help to British against the Sikhs. The relationship of some Marwat chiefs and British remained friendly for the most part, though some of Marwats joined Faqir of Ipi's movement and fought for Pashtun freedom against British India in the Waziristan War.

== Notable Marwats ==
- Mufti Mahmud Pakistani politician who is former cm of the kpk
- Fazal-ur-Rehman, Pakistani politician who is member of the National Assembly & chief of JUI
- Salim Saifullah Khan, Pakistani Politician and former Senator
- Habibullah Khan Marwat, acting President of Pakistan (1977–1978)
- Khawas Khan Marwat, One of Sher Shah Sur's leading Generals playing a major role in the Victory of the Battle of Chausa against the Mughal Empire
- Sher Afzal Marwat, Pakistani politician who is member of the National Assembly
