= Loya Paktia =

Historical and cultural region of Afghanistan

Map of loya Paktia. Comprising Paktia, Khost, Paktika, Logar, Waziristan and Kurram.

Lōya Paktiā (Pashto: لويه پکتيا; lit. Greater Paktia) is a historical and cultural region of Afghanistan, comprising the modern Afghan provinces of Khost, Paktia, and Paktika, as well as parts of Logar and compromises Kurram, Bannu and Waziristan of Khyber Pakhtunkhwa province of Pakistan. Loya Paktia is vaguely defined by a common culture and history that is connected to the local indigenous tribes that reside in the region. Particular styles of clothing, articles of clothing, turban styles, turban cloth colors, dialects of Pashto language, etc. may sometimes be associated with specific tribes indigenous to Loya Paktia and thus integrate themselves into regional culture. For instance, a Pashtun tribesman from Loy Kandahar may quickly recognize a Pashtun from Loya Paktia based upon his turban (or lungee) style and color. Likewise, a Pashtun from Loya Paktia may recognize someone from Loy Kandahar based upon his unique style of collarless kameez (shirt) with specific embroidered patterns on the front. There are many subtle and intricate cultural indicators of this type that are not recorded in any known written history but simply known and observed by the tribesmen of the various Pashtun regions of Afghanistan and Pakistan.

== Main settlements ==
The largest city of the region is Khost, while other cities of Loya Paktia include Gardez (capital of Paktia Province), Zurmat (largest city of Paktia Province), Urgun (largest city of Paktika), and Sharana (capital of Paktika).

Other main towns of Loya Paktia are Sardeh Band (Ghazni), Charkh (Logar), Tari Mangal (Kurram), Angur Ada (partly in South Waziristan), Yakubi, Tani, Matun, Aryob, Khandkhel, Tsamkani, Zarghun Shar, Wazakhwa, and Zerok.

== Demography ==
The population mostly consists of Pashtuns from various tribes under the larger Karlani and Ghilji confederacies. Predominant tribes with notable large populations native to Loya Paktia include Mangal Zadran, Zazai, Ahmadzai, Totakhil, Tani, Sabari, Sulaimankhel, Dawar, Kharoti, Wazir, Banuchi and Gurbaz. However, the majority of Pashtuns in the province belong to the Mangal ,Zazai, and Zadran tribes. Kochian are common in the region throughout the year who still live a nomadic lifestyle.

== Notable people ==
- Nur Muhammad Taraki, Afghan revolutionary who led the Saur Revolution
- Dr. Mohammad Najibullah, President of Afghanistan
- Shahnawaz Tanai, Afghan defence minister who led coup
- Assadullah Sarawari, Intelligence Director of KhAD
- Sayed Mohammad Gulabzoy, Afghan air force general and politician
- Mohammad Aslam Watanjar, Afghan general during the 1978 Coup d'état

== See also ==
- Pakhtas
