= Surobi District, Paktika =

District of Paktika Province, Afghanistan

Coordinates: 32°45′06″N 069°02′50″E

Surobi, Sarobi or Sarubi District (Pashto: سروبي ولسوالۍ) is a district of Paktika Province, Afghanistan, with a population of 48,291 people. It is situated northeast of Gomal, west of Barmal and south of Urgun and Sar Hawza. The Kharoti tribe of Ghilji Pashtuns have a strong presence here.

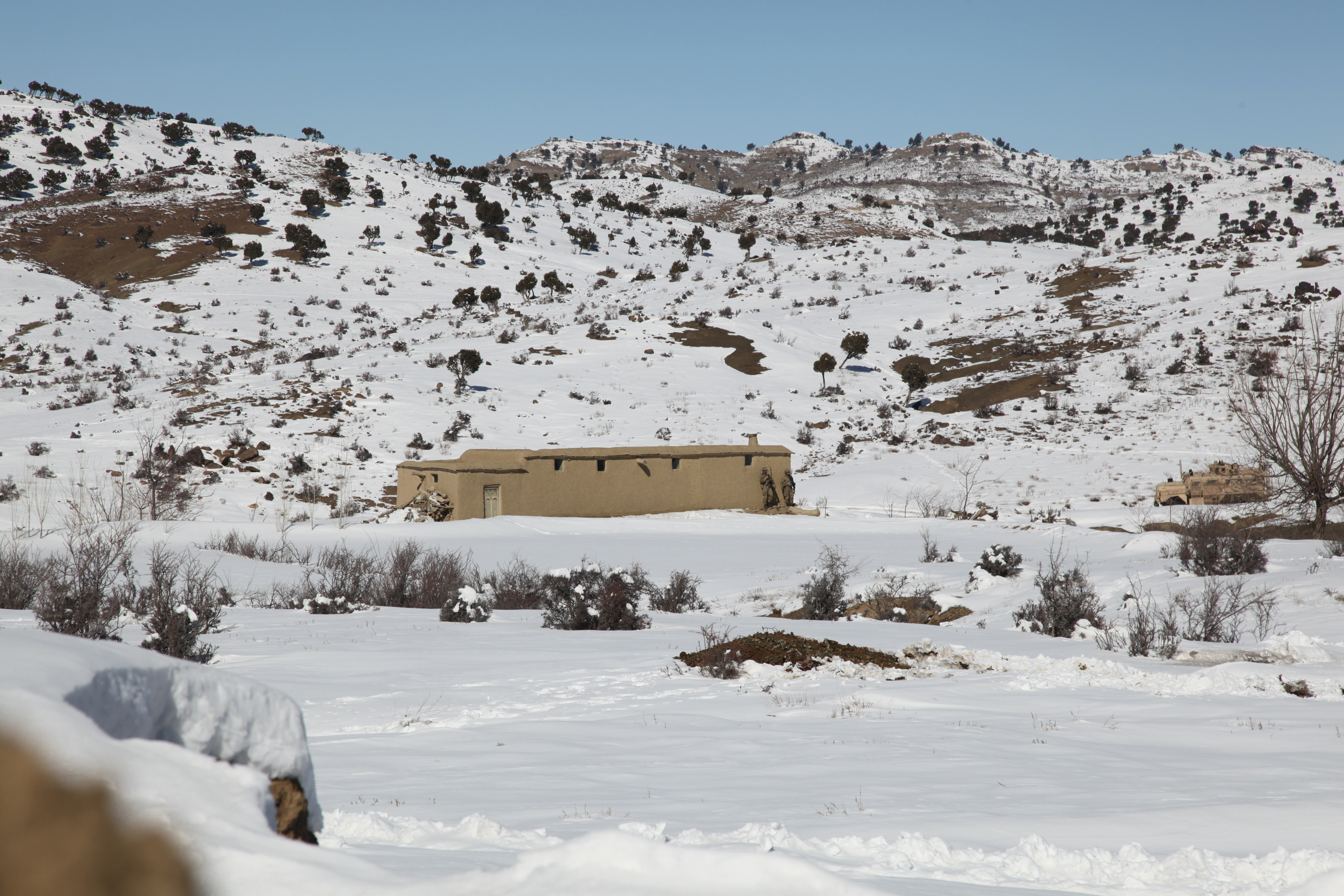
A view of the snow covered hills around the village of Shabadeen, February 8, 2012.
