= Zarghun Shar =

Zarghun Shar or Zarghun Shahr may refer to:

- Zarghun Shar, Logar, an irrigated area in Logar Province, Afghanistan
- Khairkot, also known as "Zarghun Shar", a town and district capital in Paktika Province, Afghanistan
  - Khairkot District, also known as "Zarghun Shar District", a district in Paktika Province, Afghanistan
- Zarghun Shar, Paktia, a village in Paktia Province, Afghanistan
- Zarghun Shar Shaylah, a village in Paktia Province, Afghanistan
