= Shkin =

Shkin Naryab شکين
- Location in Afghanistan
- Coordinates: 32°31′40″N 69°15′55″E
- Country: Afghanistan
- Province: Paktika Province
- District: Gomal District
- Elevation: 2,197 m (7,208 ft)
- Time zone: UTC+4:30

Shkin Naryab (Pashto: شکين) is a town that is the capital of Gomal District, Paktika Province, Afghanistan, located about a kilometer west of the newer town and bazaar of Angur Ada in the Barmal District of Paktika. As with the area immediately to the north, the Barmal Valley, the Gomal region is primarily populated by ethnic Pashtuns, which neighbours South Waziristan in Pakistan.

Soil conditions near Shkin Naryab are marginal and only allow for limited agricultural seasonal use. Aside from small apple orchards/farms there is only minimal economic activity. The closest competent health care can be found in Wana, Pakistan, and Urgun. Until recently there were no paved roads in this Barmal Valley region. However, with the construction of the nearby firebase, a permanent road from Urgun has made its way all the way to Barmal. The estimated elementary-level literacy rate for males in the Barmal Valley is 60% for males and 10-20% for females. It is an impoverished region even by Afghan standards.

Shkin Firebase was named after this village and was renamed Firebase Lilley to honor Master Sgt. Arthur L. Lilley, a U.S. Special Forces soldier who was killed in a gunfire exchange there in 2007. The base was established in 2002. It was located six kilometers from the Pakistani border. It was once considered the most dangerous location in Afghanistan.

A 2003 article in Time magazine described the base:

The U.S. firebase looks like a Wild West cavalry fort, ringed with coils of razor wire. A U.S. flag ripples above the 3-ft.-thick mud walls, and in the watchtower a guard scans the expanse of forested ridges, rising to 9,000 ft., that mark the border. When there's trouble, it usually comes from that direction.

On August 31, 2003, Army SPC Chad C. Fuller, 24, of Potsdam, NY., and Army PFC Adam L. Thomas, 21, of Palos Hills, Illinois were killed in a gun battle with Taliban forces. On 29 September, 2003, SPC Evan O’Neill, 19, of Haverhill, MA was killed by Taliban small arms fire. They were assigned to the 1st Battalion, 87th Infantry Regiment, 10th Mountain Division at Fort Drum. On October 25, 2003, paramilitary officers Christopher Mueller and William "Chief" Carlson from the CIA's Special Activities Division were killed while conducting an operation to kill/capture high level al-Qa'ida leaders. On 21 May 2004, these Officers were honored with Stars on the CIA Memorial Wall at their Headquarters in Langley, Virginia. "The bravery of these two men cannot be overstated," Director of Central Intelligence George J. Tenet told a gathering of several hundred Agency employees and family members of those killed in the line of duty. "Chris and Chief put the lives of others ahead of their own. That is heroism defined." Mueller, a former US Navy SEAL and Carlson, a former Army Special Forces soldier, Delta Force operator, and member of the Blackfeet Nation in Montana, died while on a covert operation near Shkin, Afghanistan. Both officers saved the lives of others, including Afghan soldiers, during the engagement with al-Qa'ida forces.

As described in Bob Woodward's book Obama's Wars, the CIA created Counter-Terrorism Pursuit Teams (CTPT) starting in 2001 which reached 3,000 soldiers by 2010. They were considered the "best Afghan fighting force" and, unlike the Afghan National Army, very well motivated. Firebase Lilley served as a nerve center for the covert war and a hub for these CTPT operations. These units had been considered highly effective in combat operations against the Taliban and al-Qa'ida forces and were also used to engage with the tribes in areas with no other official government presence. This covert war also included a large CIA expansion into the Federally Administered Tribal Area region of Pakistan to target senior al-Qa'ida and Taliban leadership. The CTPT units were considered key to any exit strategy for the U.S. government to leave Afghanistan, while still being able to deny al-Qa'ida and other transnational extremists groups a safe haven.

== See also ==
- Camp Chapman
- CIA
- JSOC
- Special Activities Division
- CIA Memorial Wall
- Camp Chapman attack
- Paktika Province
