= Ghudwana =

Territory at the Afghanistan–Pakistan border

- Territory
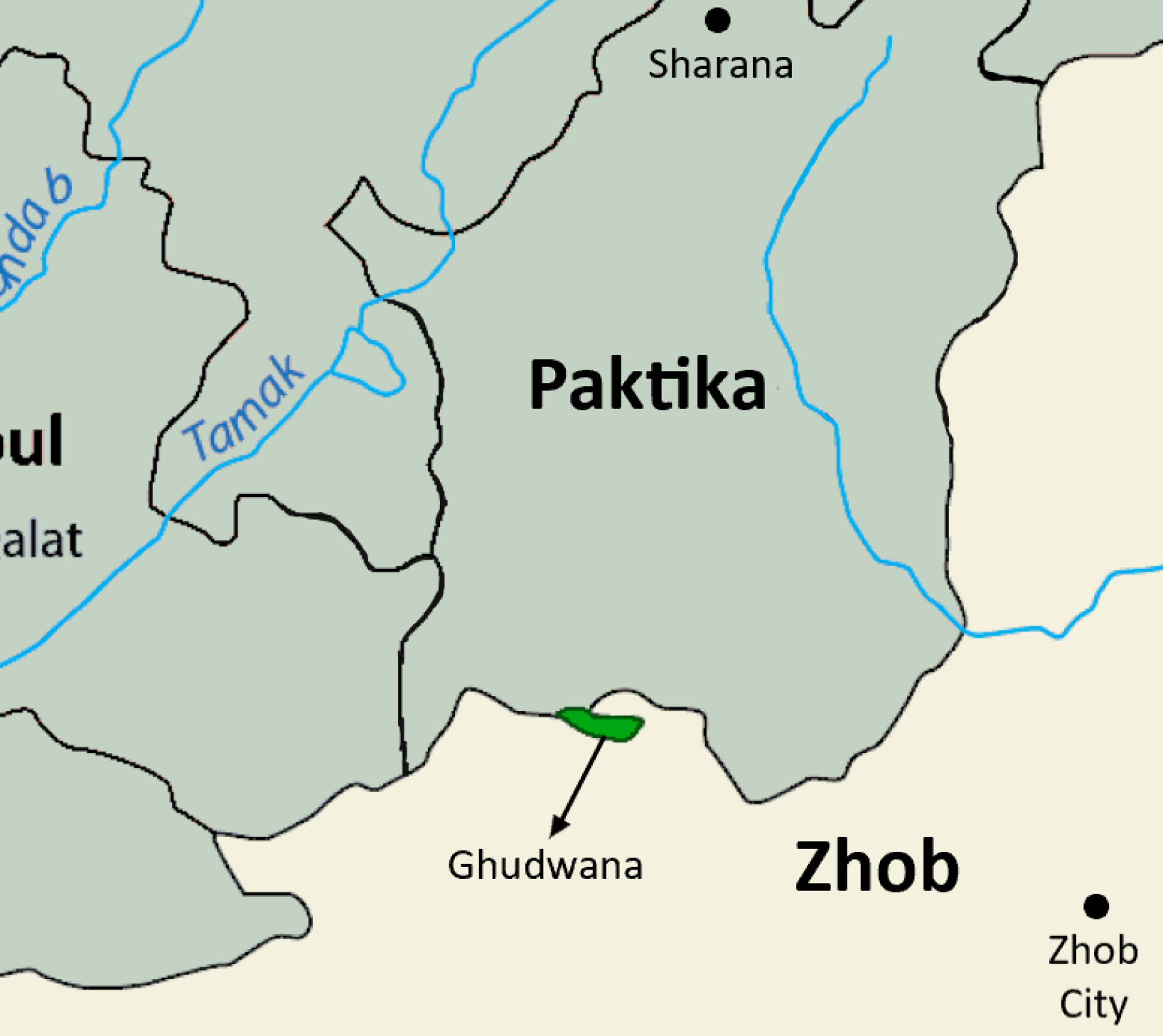
- Map of the Ghudwana Territory between the two districts

- Ghudwana
- Coordinates: 31°44′46″N 68°28′33″E
- Status: Afghanistan
- Provinces: Paktika
- Districts: Terwa District

Area
  - Total: 12 sq mi (32 km^{2})
- Time zone: UTC+04:30 (AFT)

Ghudwana (Pashto: غدوانه) is a territory located at the Afghanistan–Pakistan border. It has historically been a part of Terwa District in Paktika Province of Afghanistan. In the 2026 Afghanistan–Pakistan war, some media outlets reported that the territory had been occupied by Pakistani armed forces. However, this could not be independently verified.

== History ==
=== War in Afghanistan (2001–2021) ===
During the War in Afghanistan (2001–2021), Ghudwana became a strategically key staging zone for the Afghan Taliban and other militant groups against the Islamic Republic of Afghanistan and allied forces. The Taliban led two sieges of Ghudwana in 2015. It was also reportedly used for transporting explosive materials from Afghanistan into Pakistan by ex-TTP elements.

In August 2021, Taliban forces captured Ghudwana during the 2021 Taliban offensive from the IRA and allied forces.

=== 2026 Afghanistan–Pakistan war ===
In February 2026, during the 2026 Afghanistan–Pakistan war, several Pakistani security officials claimed that Pakistan Armed Forces had captured 32 square kilometres (12 sq mi) of Ghudwana. According to The Jerusalem Post, two Pakistani security officials claimed Pakistani soldiers holding the Ghudwana area in southern Afghanistan as of early March.

On 27 March 2026, BBC News released satellite images, sourcing Planet Labs, of the newly installed fencing in the Ghudwana sector, noting that the fence had separated the territory from Afghanistan. (Note: Reported by BBC Dari, BBC Pashto, and BBC Urdu) According to BBC, the Taliban had denied any Pakistani advance across the line. Taliban leader Haji Khan Siddiq denied all reports of fencing in the Paktika Province. The OHCHR and several UN experts put out a statement flagging the military presence in the Paktika Province as a breach of the UN Charter, which prohibits force against another state’s territorial integrity.

According to Deutsche Welle, independent verification of any buffer zone could not be done, with official sources in Islamabad not confirming any such establishment, furthermore being denied by the Taliban government.
