= Gomal Pass =

Mountain pass

- Gumal Pass
- Location within Afghanistan Location within Khyber Pakhtunkhwa Location within FATA Location within Pakistan
- Interactive map of Gomal Pass

Third Approach
- Location: Afghanistan–Pakistan border
- Range: Hindu Kush
- Coordinates: 31.9167°N 69.3167°E

Gomal Pass (Pashto: ګومل) is a mountain pass on the Durand Line border between Afghanistan and the southeastern portion of South Waziristan in Pakistan's Khyber Pakhtunkhwa province (formerly FATA). It takes its name from the Gomal River and is midway between the legendary Khyber Pass and the Bolan Pass. It connects Ghazni in Afghanistan with Tank and Dera Ismail Khan in Pakistan. Gomal Pass, for a long time, has been a trading route for nomadic Powindahs.

Two Pakistani rivers – Shna Pasta and Shore Mānda – as well as the Mandz Rāghah Kowri stream in Afghanistan flow close to Gomal Pass.

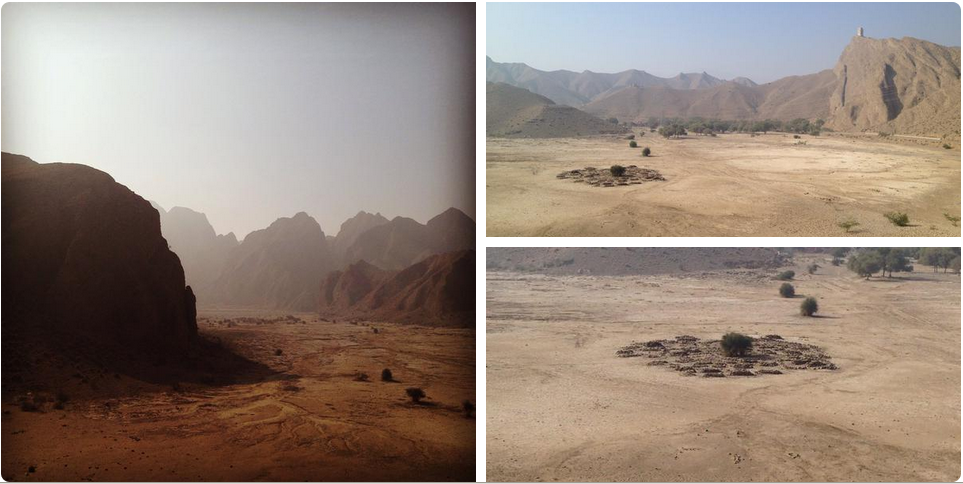
Gomal Pass.

== See also ==
- Gomal River
- Gomal Zam Dam
- Gomal University
- Gomal District
