= Urgun District =

Urgun اورګون
- District
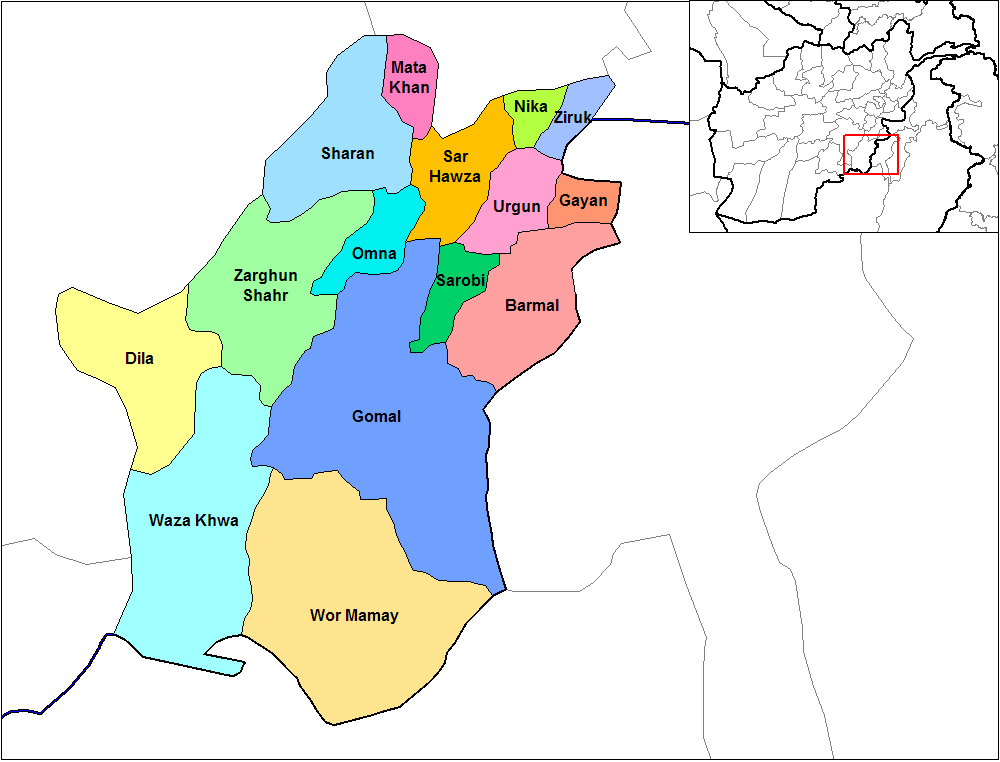
- Urgun district within the province of Paktika.

- Location in Afghanistan
- Coordinates: 32°54′2.160″N 69°09′24.840″E
- Country: Afghanistan
- Province: Paktika
- Capital: Urgun
- Time zone: UTC+4:30

Urgun (Pashto: اورګون ولسوالۍ) is a district of the remote Paktika Province in Afghanistan.

== Administrative seat ==
The administrative seat of this district is the like-named town of Urgun, also known as Loy Urgun (Pashto: لوی ارګون) meaning "Greater Urgun".

== History ==
Urgun town used to be the provincial capital until it was replaced by Sharana in the 1970s due to its proximity to the main highway, connecting it to Kabul, Ghazni, and Kandahar.

The Siege of Urgun took place between 1983 and 1984.

On October 17, 2025, in the village of Khandaro, the Pakistan Air Force killed 17 Afghan civilians, including three cricket players, and injured 16 more Afghans.

== Demographics ==
The tribes include the Kharoti, Sulaimankhel, and Wazir.

Like many place names in Afghanistan, Urgun can be spelled a number of different ways. "Urgon", "Orgun" and "Orgon", however, remain the most popular alternative spellings on maps and official documents.
