= Zerok =

Ziruk زېړوک
- Village
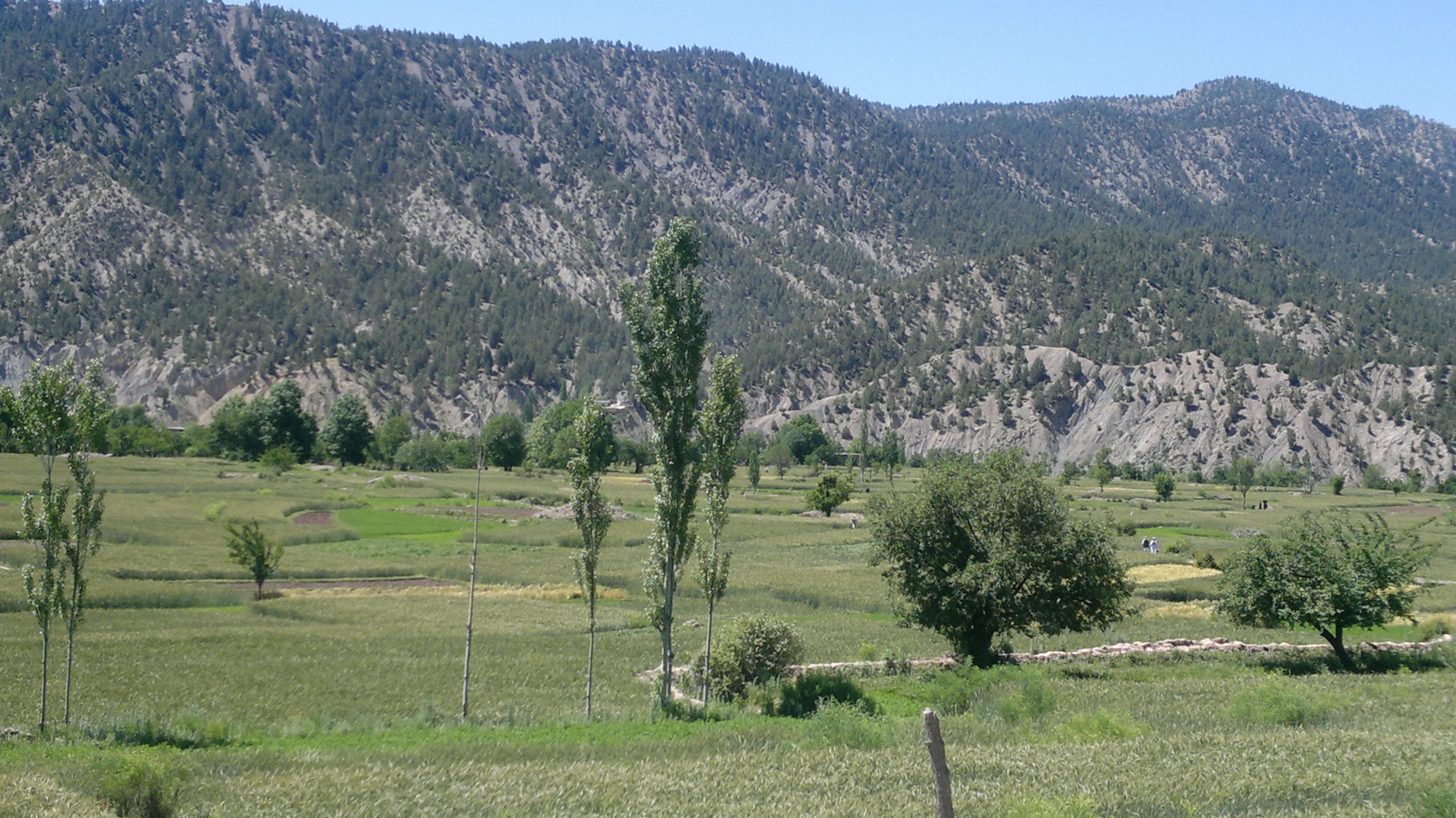
- Zerok

- Location within Afghanistan
- Coordinates: 33°9′29″N 69°18′34″E
- Country: Afghanistan
- Province: Paktika Province
- District: Zerok District

Zēṛōk, also known as Ziruk, (Pashto: زېړوک) is the main town of Zerok District in Paktika Province, Afghanistan. It is located within the heart of Zadran land on the main Khost-Urgun road.

== History ==
On 5 May 1978, two Hezbi Islami members, Jalaludin Haqqani and Aziz Khan, preached at the local mosque after the Friday prayer. They called to the congregants to fight against the governments that they deemed as infidels that made the Afghans who believed in gods insecure. Subsequently, Haqqani and Khan mobilized the mobs, and they attacked the local government offices. The attack led to the death of a high-ranking official and the disarmament of the local army. As a result, Zerok fell to the Hezbi Islami's hand, making this settlement its first territory within Afghanistan.

== See also ==
- Khost
- Loya Paktia
