= Janikhel District =

Janikhel District may refer to:

- Janikhel District (Paktia), Afghanistan
- Janikhel District (Paktika), Afghanistan

== See also ==
- Janikhel, a town in Bannu, Khyber Pakhtunkhwa, Pakistan
