= Kharoti =

Pashtun tribe of Ghilji origin

The Kharoti (Pashto:خروٹی) خروټی) are a Pashtun tribe of Ghilji origin, originating in the central part of Paktika Province, Afghanistan, but can be also found in other parts of the country. The Kharoti settled in Kharotabad in Quetta, British India (now Pakistan) around 1945.

There are large Kharoti populations in the Paktika districts of Urgun, Barmal, Sar Hawza, Zarghun Shahr, Omna, Surobi, and in Ghazni, Zabul, Paktia, Khost, Logar, Wardak, Kabul, Nangarhar, Helmand, Gomal, Bannu, Lakki Marwat, Dera Ismail Khan and Quetta.

== Significance ==
As Pashtuns of the Ghilji confederacy, the heyday of the Kharotis was during the peak of the Khāns of the Nasher-Nashir family. With the rise of the rival Durrani confederacy in the 18th century, the Kharoti lost their leading role in Afghan politics but remained strong in rural Afghan regions. However, they often view themselves as the "true Pashtuns" and, being Ghilji, as the rightful leaders of Afghanistan.

The Kharoti, along with the Ghilzais and Hazara, were recorded as frequenting the Kurram Valley in British India by missionary Theodore Pennell in 1909. Around 1945, the tribe settled in Quetta, founding Kharotabad.

== Notable Kharotis ==
- Hafizullah Amin, president of Afghanistan and organiser of the Saur Revolution
- Gulbuddin Hekmatyar, politician, Afghan warfare leader during soviet union occupation (Hizb-e-Islami Chairman) and former prime minister
- Mawlawe Arsala Rahmani Kharoti, renowned Commander during the Soviet invasion of Afghanistan, prime minister in Mujahideen era, member of Sana (Mashrano Jarga) and director of the Afghan Peace Committee and elder of Kharoti tribe
- Haji Merajuddin Khan Kharoti, former justice minister of Afghanistan and elder of Kharoti tribe
- Sher Khan Nasher, Loe Khan (Grand Khan) (Note: for other use of title Lōy Khan see Mir Zaman Khan) founder of Spinzar Cotton Company and founding father of Kunduz
- Haji Niaz Muhammad Amiri, Ghazni, Afghanistan, member of parliament in 2006 and Governor of Logar province
- Dr. Ahmad Shah Kharoti, general director of finance and administration of MOPH Afghanistan and elder of Kharoti tribe
- Maulavi Abdul Hai Mutmaen, Politician, Spokesperson of Mullah Omar, advisor to Mullah Akhtar Mansour, senior member of the Taliban
- Gholam Serwar Nasher, Khan (1922–1984), president of Spinzar Cotton Company
- Abdul Ahad Kharot, represented the Kingdom of Afghanistan in the 1948 Summer Olympic Games
- Malak Agha Mohammad Abbaskhil from Sarobi Paktika, he was Senator from 2004 to 2010 The House of Elders or Mesherano Jirga (Pashto/Dari: مشرانو جرگه یا خانه کهن سالان), is the upper house of the bicameral National Assembly of Afghanistan
- Farhad Darya Khan Nasher, (born 1962), singer and composer
- Mirwais Ashraf, Afghanistan national cricket team player
- Sharafuddin Ashraf, Afghanistan National Cricket Team player
- Engineer Matiullah Kharoti leader of Kharoti tribe in Afghanistan
- Haji Ghulam Dastagir, tribal leader and businessman and a big name in the brick industry in Afghanistan

== See also ==
- Urgun
- Angur Ada
- Loya Paktia
- Ghoriwala
