= Randghar China =

Randghar China, Pakistan

Randghar China is in Balochistan, Pakistan. It is near to the Gomal River. The Zhob-Wana road passes through it.

A predominantly Islamic region Randghar China is a spring(class H - Hydro graphic) in Baluchistan, Pakistan (Asia) with the region font code of Asia/Pacific. It is located at an elevation of 1,099 meters above sea level. Randghar Chīna is also known as Randghar China, Randghar Chīna, Randgnar China.

Its coordinates are 31°53'1" N and 69°26'56" E in DMS (Degrees Minutes Seconds) or 31.8836 and 69.4489 (in decimal degrees). Its UTM position is WA42 and its Joint Operation Graphics reference is NH42-03.

The local currency is Rupee (PKR). Brahui, English, Sindhi, Panjabi, Pushto and Urdu are most common languages. Neighboring countries are China, Afghanistan, Iran, India. The standard time zone for Randghar China is UTC/GMT+5
