= Gomal River =

River in Afghanistan and Pakistan

Gomal
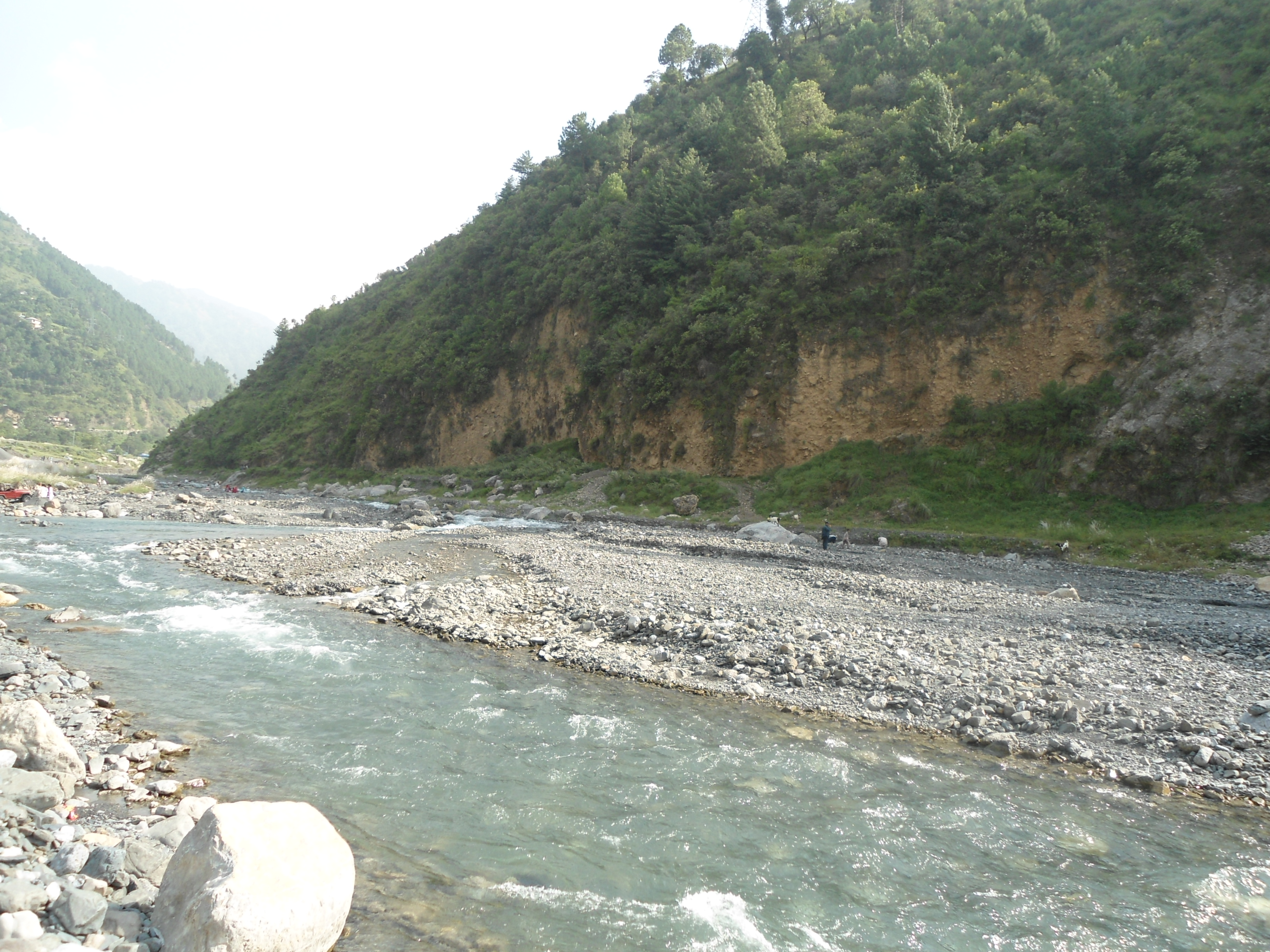

Location
- Countries: Afghanistan and Pakistan
- Provinces: Paktika; Balochistan; Khyber Pakhtunkhwa

Physical characteristics
- Source
  - location: Katawaz Region, Gomal District, Paktika Province, Afghanistan
  - coordinates: 32.502974°N 68.901294°E
- Mouth: Indus River
  - location: Dera Ismail Khan, Dera Ismail Khan District, Khyber Pakhtunkhwa, Pakistan
  - coordinates: 31°36′53″N 70°50′46″E
- Length: 400 km (250 mi)

Basin features
- Progression: Indus→ Arabian Sea
- Tributaries
  - left: Wana Khwar
  - right: Zhob River

The Gomal ( Pashto: ګومل سیند، ګومل دریاب) is a 400-kilometre-long (250 mi) river in Afghanistan and Pakistan. It rises in northern Afghanistan's Paktika Province and joins the Indus River 32 kilometres south of Dera Ismail Khan, in Pakistan's Khyber Pakhtunkhwa province.

Gomal University in Dera Ismail Khan and Gomal District in Afghanistan's Paktika province are named after the river.

== Etymology ==
The name Gomal is thought to have derived from the river Gomati, which is mentioned in the Rigveda.

== Course ==
Gomal River's headwaters are located in the northern part of Paktika Province, southeast of the city of Ghazni. The springs which form the headwaters of the Gomal's main branch emerge above the fort at Babakarkol in Katawaz, a district in Paktika inhabited by Ghilji Pashtuns from the Kharoti and Sulaimankhel clans. The Gomal's other branch, the "Second Gomal", joins the main channel about 22.5 kilometres below its source. The Gomal flows southeast through the eastern Ghilji country before entering Khyber Pakhtunkhwa, Pakistan.

Within Pakistan, the Gomal River forms the boundary between South Waziristan and Balochistan. Approximately 177 kilometres from its source, it merges with the Zhob River, its major tributary, near Khajuri Kach.

It is about 160 kilometres from the Zhob River to the Indus River. The river enters the Gomal Valley in Tank District at a place known as Girdavi, which is inhabited by the Miani Pashtuns. It is mainly here that the water of Gomal is used to cultivate the lands in the Gomal Valley through Zam System (Rod Kohi). The river passes then through the Damaan plain in Kulachi Tehsil and later on through Dera Ismail Khan Tehsil. It joins the Indus River 32 kilometres south of the city of Dera Ismail Khan.

== Gomal Zam Dam ==
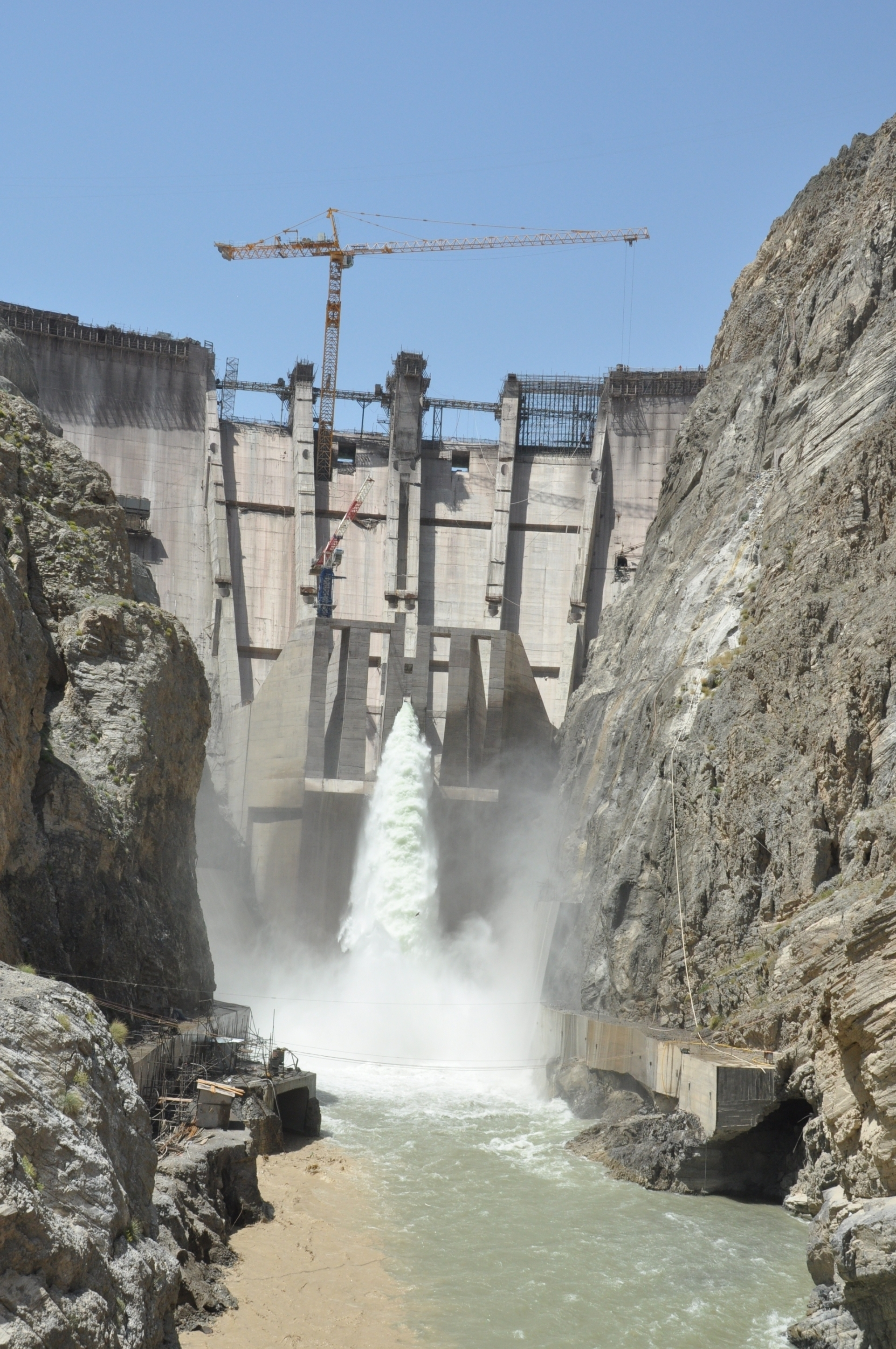
The Gomal Zam Dam was inaugurated in 2013.

The damming of this river at Khajuri Kachh was envisaged as far back as 1898, even after its administrative approval by the Government of Pakistan in 1963. Work on the Gomal Zam Dam was stopped in 1965; not to restart till 2001 during the rule of Pervez Musharraf. It was opened and inaugurated in 2013.

A street in E-7 sector, Islamabad, is called Gomal Road.

== See also ==
- Gomal Zam Dam
- Gomal Pass
- Gomal District
- Gomal University
- Zhob River
- South Waziristan
- Paktika Province
