= Spera District =

District of Khost Province, Afghanistan

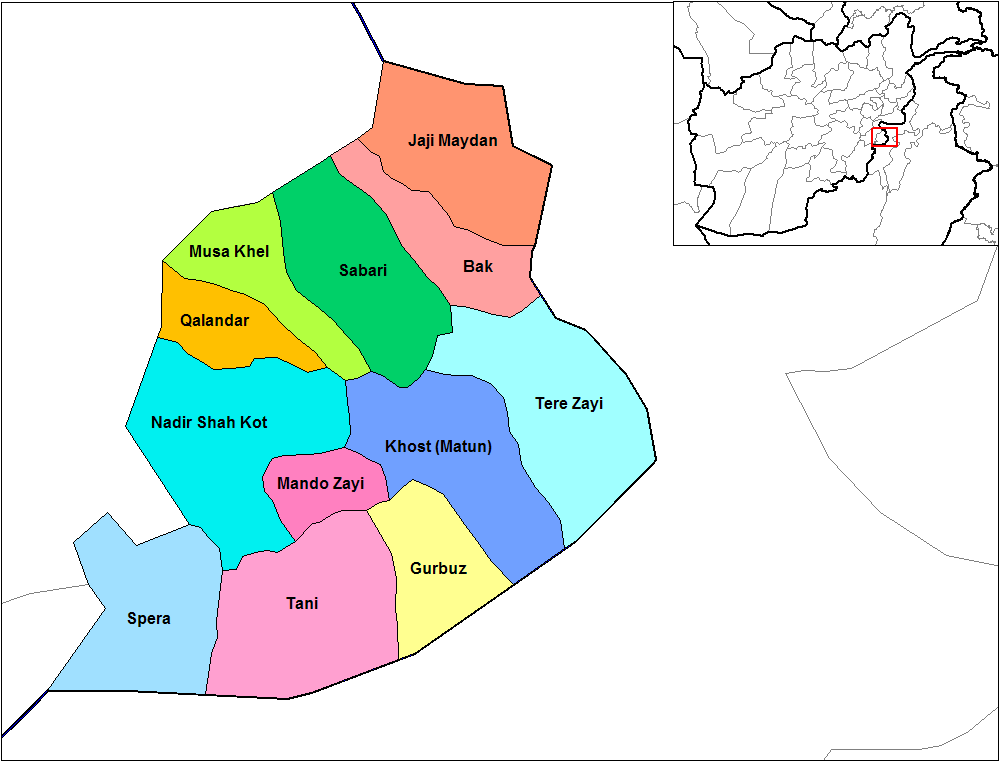
Map of Khost Province with Spera district appearing in light bluish in the lower left corner

Spera District (Pashto: د سپېرې ولسوالۍ) is situated in the most southwestern part of Khost Province, Afghanistan. It borders with Paktia Province to the south and west, Shamal District to the north. The district is within the heartland of the Zadran tribe of Pashtuns. To the east it borders Nadir Shah Kot and Tani districts as well as Khyber Pakhtunkhwa in Pakistan. The population of Spera District is around 21,500 people. The district center is the village of Spera, situated in the central part of the district.

== History ==
On 16 April 2022, Pakistani airstrikes targeted several villages in Spera District, including Afghan-Dubai, Pasa Mela, Mir Sapar, Mandata, and Kanai, and struck refugee camps belonging to internally displaced persons from Waziristan, killing at least 41 people, mainly women and children, and wounding 22 others.

Spera was one of the districts most affected by the 2022 Afghanistan earthquake. Approximately 500 homes were destroyed, and 40 people were killed, with 95 others injured in the district. Many houses constructed primarily of mud and wood were razed to the ground. Heavy rain and the earthquake contributed to landslides that destroyed entire hamlets.

=== Construction of new earthquake-resistant houses ===
In August 2022, new "earthquake-resistant houses" began to be constructed in the district for victims of the earthquake. The project involves the establishment of 300 houses here and 2,000 homes in both the Gayan and Barmal districts of neighboring Paktika Province.
