= Wor Mamay District =

Wor Mamay
- District
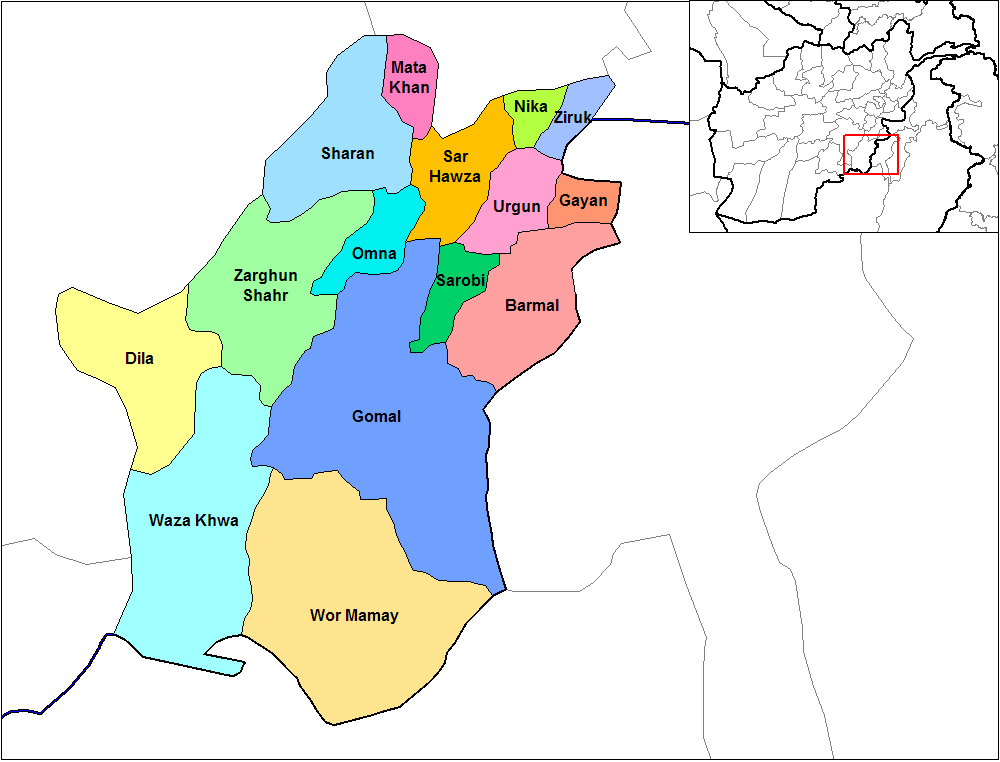
- Wor Mamay district (in yellow) within the province of Paktika.

- Location in Afghanistan
- Country: Afghanistan
- Province: Paktika

Population (2019)
  - Total: 21,404
- Time zone: UTC+4:30

Wor Mamay District (Pashto: وور مامه) is a district of Paktika Province, Afghanistan. In 2019 its estimated population was 21,404. The district is within the heartland of the Sulaimankhel tribe of Ghilji Pashtuns.
