= Gulwal =

Gulwal (Pashto: ګلوال) is a branch of the Suleiman Khel subgroup of the Pashtun people. Predominantly Sunni Muslims who live in western Afghanistan, South Waziristan Zarmelan, and Punjab in India and have subbranches, such as Shahbuzarg. kalakhel. Pachak, Azikkhel, and Ashiqkhel. They are not influenced by modernisation and their literacy rate is very low, but is increasing. The group also has its own unique customs and culture.

The clan's name, sometimes spelled as Zlikhil or Zlikhan, traces back to two sons of Zlikhan: Mamriz Khan and Boghai Khan. Mamriz Khan had two sons, Amir Khan and Kashmir Khan. Amir Khan's descendants include Sawan Khan, Dugai/Fazl Khan, Shirap Khan, Gwalim Khan, and Kalat Khan. On the other hand, Kashmir Khan's lineage comprises Khushhal Khan, Jag Khan, ghalai khan, and umar khan. The progeny of Mamrizkhel and Fatah Khan include Naaw Khan and Aajib Khan, among others. The lineage can be summarized as follows (numbers represent generational position):

- 0 - Zlikhan
  - 1 - Mamriz Khan
    - 2 - Amir Khan
      - 3 - Sawan Khan
      - 3 - Dugai/Fazi Khan
      - 3 - Shirap Khan
      - 3 - Gwalim Khan
      - 3 - Kalat Khan
    - 2 - Kashmir Khan
      - 3 - Khushhal Khan
      - 3 - Jag Khan
      - 3 - Kako Khan/Ya
      - 3 - Ghahla
    - 3 Boghai khan
    - 1 - Fatah Khan
    - 3 - Naaw Khan
    - 3 - Aajib Khan
    - 3 - Zair khan

Due to limited information about other Shahabzairg clans, this account focuses primarily on the Mamrizkhel (descendants of Mamriz Khan).

Most of the people of the tribe live in Punjab, Deira Ismail Khan and Dabarah. In the hot season, people go to Zarmilan and in the winter, they return to Punjab and Deira Ismail Khan and return to their businesses and lands.
