= Terwa District =

District of Paktika Province, Afghanistan

Coordinates: 33°22′00.3″N 68°55′59.9″E

Terwa District (Pashto: تېروه ولسوالۍ tərwo wuləswāləi) is a district of Paktika Province, Afghanistan. It was created in 2004 within Waza Khwa District. The estimated population in 2019 was 11,072 .
