= Siege of Urgun =

Battle of the Soviet–Afghan war

Coordinates: 32.9411°N 69.1800°E

- Part of the Soviet–Afghan War
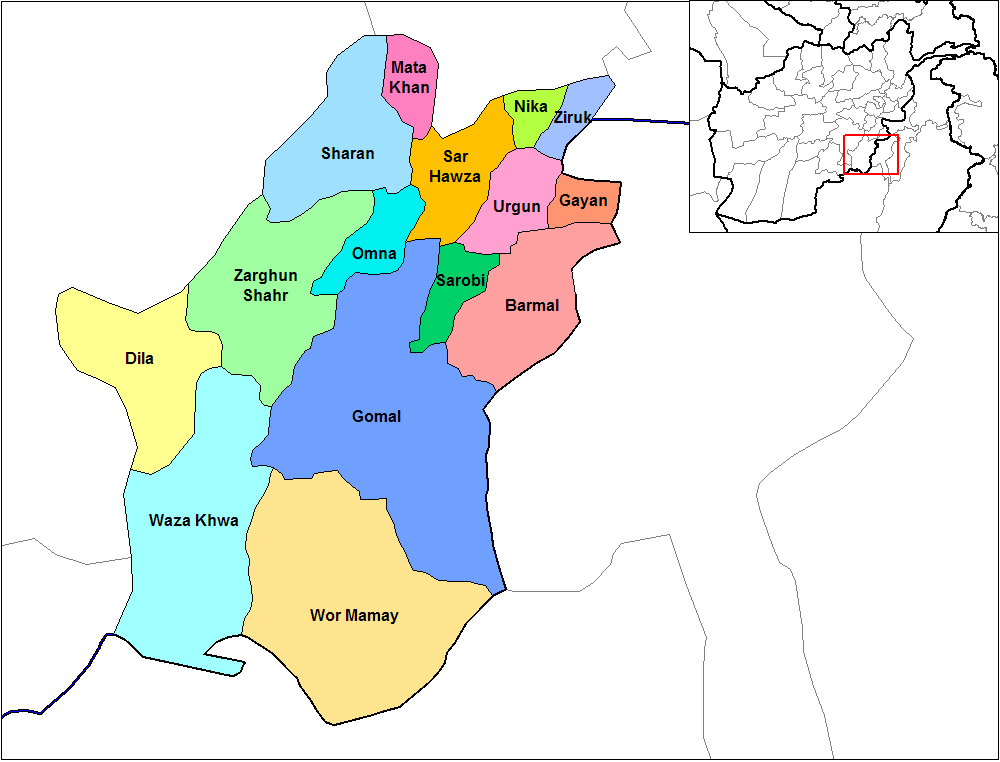
- Districts of Paktika province
Date	August 1983 – January 16, 1984
Location	Urgun, Paktika Province, Afghanistan
Result	DRA victory

Belligerents
Afghanistan	Afghan Mujahideen; Islamic Union; Hezb-e Islami Khalis; NIFA; Haqqani network; Pakistan

Commanders and leaders
(Afghanistan) General Jamaluddin Omar (Afghanistan) Colonel Sayed Rahman	Jalaluddin Haqqani; Arsala Rahmani; Gulbaz Matiullah; Mawlawi Ahmad Gul; Qauzi Kharoti

Units involved
Afghan Armed Forces; Afghan Army; Afghan Commando Forces; 666th “Air Assault” Commando Regiment; Afghan Air Force; DRA militias	Unknown

Strength
900; Local militia	800+; 2 T-55 Tanks

Casualties and losses
243 surrendered	Soviet claim: 600 killed

The siege of Urgun was a military engagement that took place during the Soviet–Afghan War. Between August 1983 and January 1984, Mujahideen forces laid siege to the town of Urgun, which was defended by a garrison of troops loyal to the Democratic Republic of Afghanistan. The mujahideen tried to take the town by storm using tanks, but despite making initial progress, they were eventually driven back and the siege was lifted.

== Prelude ==
Starting in July 1983, large numbers of Mujahideen fighters began to concentrate around Urgun. The town represented a political objective, in that the newly formed Mujahideen government-in-exile had set its sights on Urgun as a future provisional capital. The attacking Mujahideen belonged to three parties: Sayyaf's Islamic Union for the Liberation of Afghanistan, Khalis' Hezb-e Islami Khalis (HIK), and Gailani's National Islamic Front of Afghanistan (NIFA). They were joined by a certain number of freelance Pashtun mercenaries, attracted by the prospect of loot. Sayyaf managed to persuade major commanders, such as Jalaluddin Haqqani, to participate in the offensive. The mujahideen belonged to the Wazir, Jadran and Kharoti tribes.

The DRA garrison consisted of 900 men of the 15th Brigade, under Colonel Sayed Rahman, supplemented by some local militias. 600 men were deployed inside the town, and the remainder in outlying outposts. The Urgun airfield, situated to the west of the town, was defended by a reinforced company. A battalion unit was stationed at a fort known as Nek Mohammed Kala, 4 kilometres (2.5 mi) to the south of the town, and another company occupied a post 1.5 kilometres (0.93 mi) to the north of Urgun, protecting the main road leading into the town. An old fort, known as the Octagonal Fort, served as the main DRA position, protecting the town itself.

== Siege ==
In August 1983, the mujahideen laid siege to the Nek Mohammed Kala fortress, but they were unable to approach it as it was protected by minefields and heavy machine-guns. However, on September 18, the insurgents were able to ambush a supply column and capture a tank. The prize, crewed by former DRA crewmen was quickly put to use, clearing a path through the minefields and knocking out the machine guns, before breaching the fort walls. A 65-strong mujahideen assault party stormed through the breach, after which the Nek Mohammed Kala garrison quickly surrendered. Of the 243 prisoners, most were released, and those who wished were allowed to join the resistance. A few days later, the mujahideen completed the encirclement of Urgun, by capturing a security outpost on a mountain to the west of the town. The DRA garrison were forced to rely on aerial resupply, as all roads were cut. However, the road between the airfield and the town was under mujahideen machine-gun fire, so supplies could only be carried in armoured vehicles. To bolster their defenses, the DRA flew in an operations group led by General Jamaluddin Omar, who redeployed one battalion to the south of Urgun.

In January 1984, the mujahideen began the second phase of their plan, a direct assault on Urgun itself. The plan called for an attack led by the captured tank from the south, together with a concerted attack from the north, led by another tank, and the broadcasting of tank engine sounds from the southeast, in order to deceive the defenders over the direction of the main assault. After an artillery preparation, the attack from the south began, and met with initial success. The tank crossed the minefields protecting Urgun, destroying machine guns on the way, followed by an assault group that overran the positions of the battalion defending the south of the town. The DRA soldiers who evaded capture retreated into the octagonal fort, where General Jamaluddin Omar was stationed. However, the northern attack never got underway, as the second tank had got stuck in the sand. The mujahideen who had entered Urgun soon began to run short of ammunition, and one of the crew members of their tank was killed. The tank was sent back to the rear to fetch ammunition, but some mujahideen saw this as a signal to retreat, and the DRA garrison managed to counterattack and drive the mujahideen from the town. In the morning, Soviet and Afghan aircraft relentlessly bombed and strafed the exposed mujahideen, destroying their tank and forcing them to retreat into the mountains.

On January 16, an Afghan army column broke through to Urgun, lifting the siege.

== Aftermath ==
The attack against Urgun was part of a general offensive by the Mujahideen in eastern Afghanistan. A concurrent attack against Khost also failed, but the insurgents managed to capture Jaji. The mujahideen parties in Pakistan had received new weapons, and thus the insurgents demonstrated new confidence in carrying out large-scale operations involving different factions. However, they were still plagued by internal divisions. In autumn 1983, two tank crews defected from the Urgun garrison with their T-55s, but quarrels over the ownership of the tanks between NIFA and HIK prevented them from being used in the battle.

According to Olivier Roy, the fighting around Urgun still bore the hallmarks of the traditional tribal warfare of Afghanistan. It took the shape of a rapid flareup of violence, occurring in the period after the harvests and continuing during the winter. It was characterised by a lack of strategy, and the immediate goal was the capture of booty. For the Mujahideen guarding the road to Urgun, there was a strong possibility that would be denied their share of the loot, in favour of those participating in the direct assault of the town. Therefore they rapidly abandoned their positions, which explains why the government forces had little difficulty in breaking the siege.
