= Mata Khan District =

Mata Khan متا خان
- District
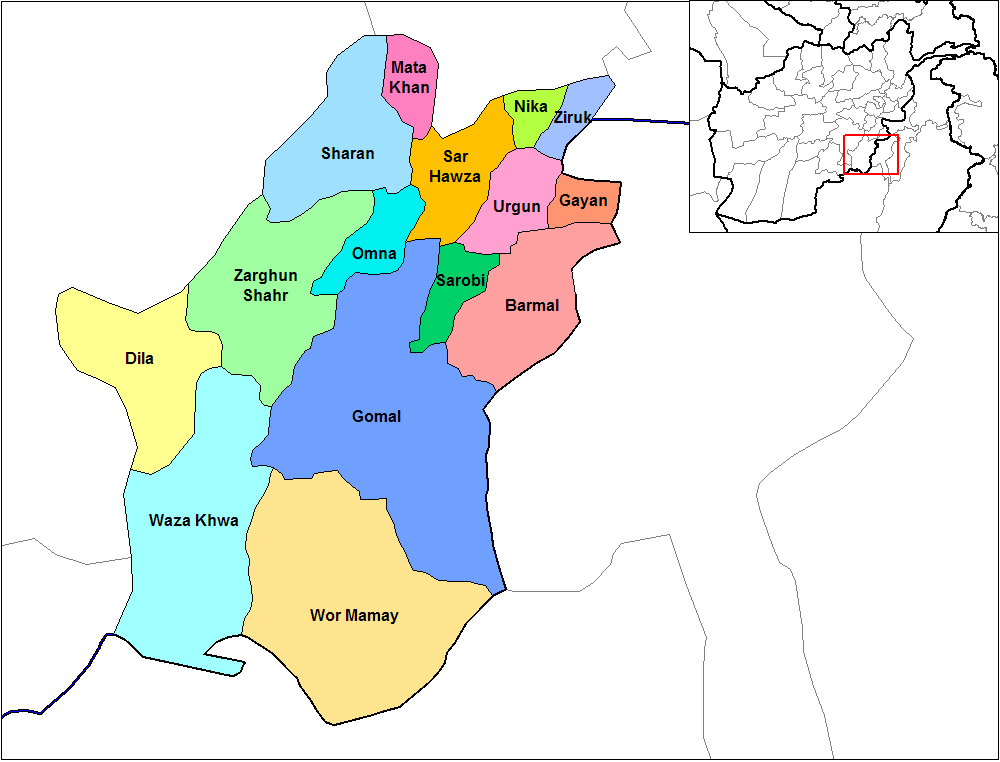
- Mata Khan district (in purple) within the province of Paktika.

- Location in Afghanistan
- Country: Afghanistan
- Province: Paktika

Population (2019)
  - Total: 26,720
- Time zone: UTC+4:30

Mata Khan District (Pashto: متا خان ولسوالۍ) is a district of Paktika Province, Afghanistan. The district is within the heartland of the Andar tribe of Ghilji Pashtuns. The estimated population in 2019 was 26,720.

Mata Khan District is located in the northern part of Paktika province, bordering Paktia's Zurmat District and Ghazni's Andar District. Its postal/zip code is 2459.
