= Wazakhwa District =

District in Paktika Province, Afghanistan

Wāzakhwā District (Pashto: وازه خوا ولسوالۍ) is a district of Paktika Province, Afghanistan. The district center is Wazakhwa. In 2019 the estimated population was 45,843. The district is within the heartland of the Sulaimankhel tribe of Ghilji Pashtuns.
