= Nika District =

- District
- District Location
- Coordinates: 33.2004°N 69.3116°E

Nika District (Pashto: نکه ولسوالۍ), also known as Naka, is one of the most remote districts in Paktika Province, Afghanistan. It lies in a bowl-shaped valley and is only accessible by a few rocky river beds and a single dirt road, the latter of which is not passable in winter. The valley's economy is rudimentary and relies on wood cutting and subsistence farming. The district is within the heartland of the Zadran tribe of Pashtuns. The population in 2019 was estimated at 16,747. It was, until the US invasion 2001, a bastion for the Taliban, with mid-level and a few senior Taliban commanders spending time there, including Jalaluddin Haqqani, who has since taken up a prominent role in Al Queda and is rumored to have been one of Osama bin Laden's senior advisors.
