= Gayan District =

District in Paktika Province, Afghanistan

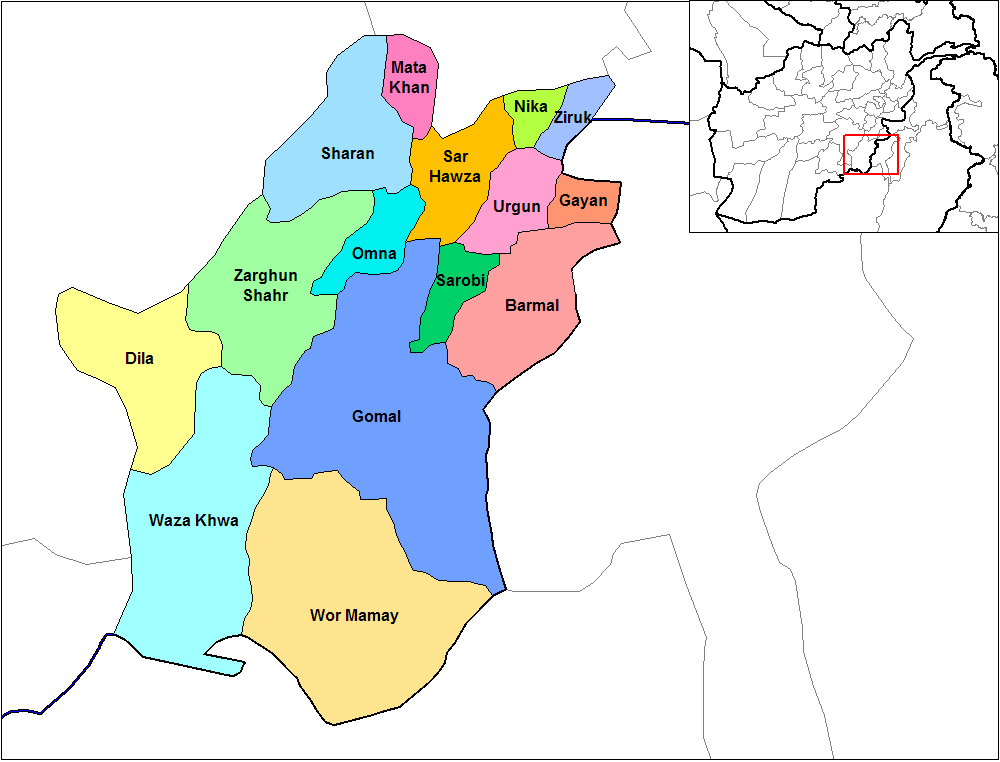
Map of Paktika Province with the district of Gayan being in orange color in the upper right.

Gayan District (Pashto: ګيان ولسوالۍ) is a district of Paktika Province, Afghanistan. The estimated population in 2019 was 46,977 people. The district is within the heartland of the Zadran tribe of Pashtuns.

== History ==
Gayan was one of the districts most affected by the magnitude 6.0 earthquake on 22 June 2022. Approximately 1,800 homes, or 70 percent of the district's homes, were destroyed, and 238 people were killed, with 393 others injured. Many houses constructed primarily of mud and wood were razed to the ground. Heavy rain and the earthquake contributed to landslides that destroyed entire hamlets.

The local clinic in Gayan, which had the capacity of only five patients, was also heavily damaged. Of the 500 or so patients admitted to the building due to the earthquake, about 200 of them died. Three days later, an aftershock killed five persons and wounded 11 more in the district.

=== Construction of new earthquake-resistant houses ===
In August 2022, new "earthquake-resistant houses" began to be constructed in the district for victims of the earthquake. The project involves the establishment of 2,000 homes in both Gayan and Barmal districts of Paktika Province, including 300 houses in Spera District of neighboring Khost Province.
