= Omna District =

District in Paktika, Afghanistan

Omna اومنه
- District
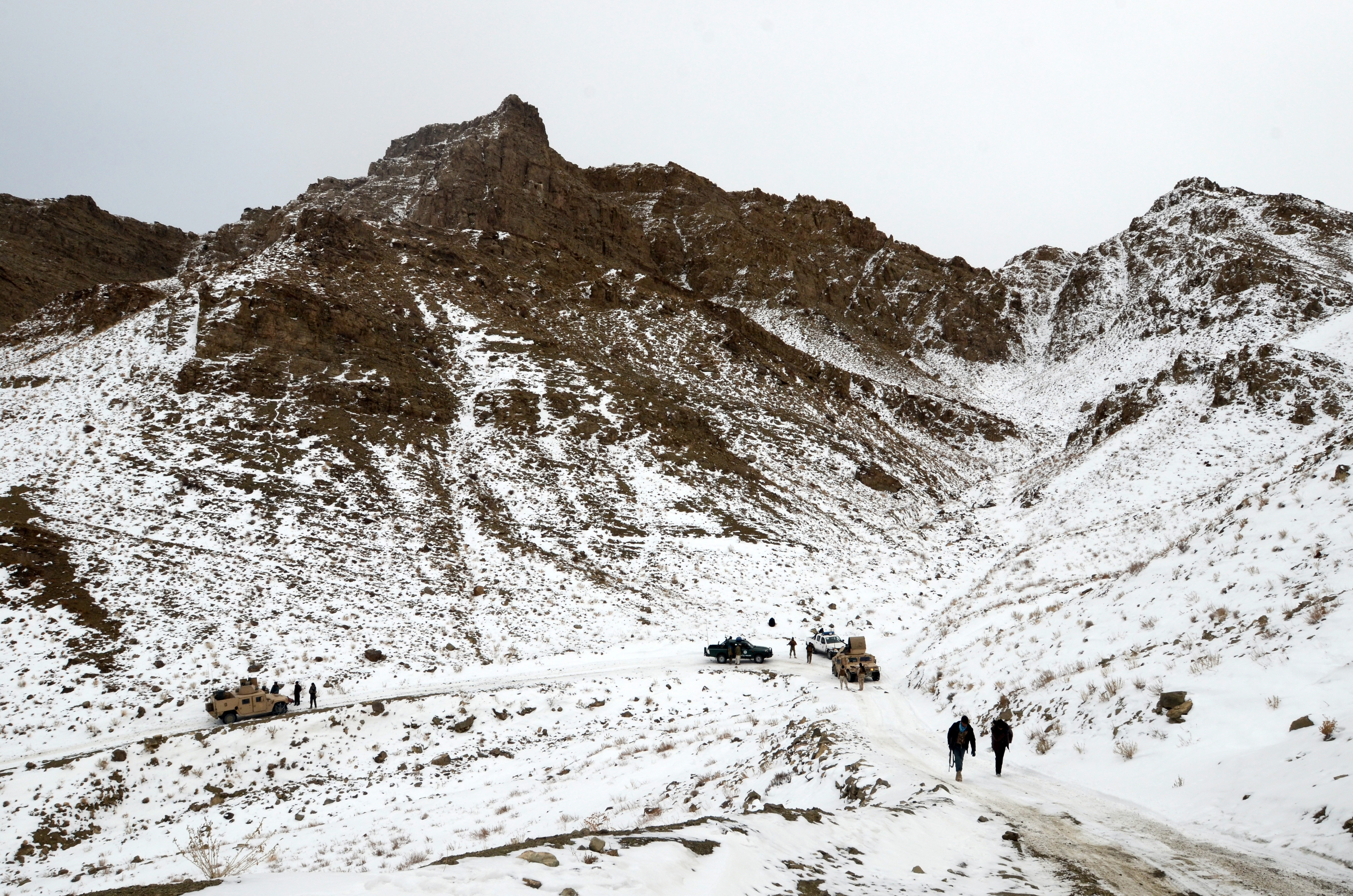
- Afghan Local Police and other Afghan National Security Forces drive up a mountain pass in Omna district 2014.

- Location in Afghanistan
- Coordinates: 32°57′52.34″N 68°56′28.97″E
- Country: Afghanistan
- Province: Paktika

Population (2019)
  - Total: 23,400
- Time zone: UTC+4:30

Omna District (Pashto: اومنه ولسوالۍ) is a district of Paktika Province, Afghanistan. The district is within the heartland of the Sulaimankhel tribe of Ghilji Pashtuns. The estimated population in 2019 was 23,400.
