= Angoor Adda =

Angoor Adda: انگور اڈہ (Urdu); انګوراډه (Pashto)
- Town
- Location within Khyber Pakhtunkhwa Location within Pakistan
- Coordinates: 32°30′56″N 69°16′57″E
- Country: Pakistan
- Administrative unit: Khyber Pakhtunkhwa
- District: South Waziristan
- Elevation: 2,254 m (7,395 ft)
- Time zone: UTC+05:00 (PST)

Angoor Adda (Pashto: انګوراډه; Urdu: اَن٘گُور اَڈَّہ, lit. 'Grape Base') is a town in the South Waziristan of Pakistan's Khyber Pakhtunkhwa, straddling the border between Afghanistan's Paktika Province in the Barmal District. It is one of the few easy passages across this mountainous border, and one of two between Paktika and Waziristan, the other passage being the Gomal River.

== History ==
The actual official Durand Line, first demarcated in 1895, slices through the east side of the main bazaar area, placing most of the built up area legally in Afghanistan. However, the military forces and gates enforcing border control are several hundred meters west of the boundary and thus west of the main bazaar area, placing nearly all of the village's built-up area under Pakistani administration. In 2003 it was reported that eight people had been gunned down in Angoor Adda, suspected of being US informants.

=== 2008 Angoor Adda raid ===
On September 3, 2008, a raid was conducted by a US military force on Angoor Adda in which 20 civilians, including at least 3 women and 4 children, were killed. This is not the first time Afghan based US troops cross the Afghan-Pakistani border in pursuit of enemy fighters, but was the first to be widely reported.

== Demographics ==
The population in the area is Pashtun, predominantly from the Wazir and Kharoti tribes.

== Transport ==
=== Border Terminal ===
Following a period of closure, the Angoor Adda Border Terminal in South Waziristan was re-established to resume formal trade with Afghanistan. The modernization project was assigned to the National Logistics Corporation (NLC), a state-owned logistics and engineering organization.

== See also ==
- Paktika Province
