= Zarghun Shar, Logar =

Zarghun Shar زرغون ښار
- village
- Location within Afghanistan
- Coordinates: 34°07′13″N 069°08′22″E
- Country: Afghanistan
- Province: Logar Province
- Rural District: Mohammad Agha District
- Time zone: UTC+4:30 (IRST)
  - Summer (DST): UTC+5:30 (IRDT)

Zarghūn Khār (Pashto: زرغون ښار), Zarghūn Shār (Dari: زرغون شهر) or Zarghūn Shār-e ‘Alī Kheyl (Dari: زرغون شهر علی خیل), is a large irrigated area in Mohammad Agha District, Logar Province, eastern Afghanistan. It is west of the Pastah Plains and south of the Qal‘ah-ye Dowlat Plains, and supports the villages of Shah Qal‘ah, Mālī Khēl, Deh Mēnah, ‘Alī Khēl and Deh-e Manakah.

== The Shrine of Khwaja Sadr-e Awlia ==
In Zarghun Shar lies the shrine of Khwaja Sadr-e Awlia. The site is a popular place of pilgrimage, attracting visitors from around the province.
