= Sar Hawza District =

Sar Hawza سر حوزه
- District
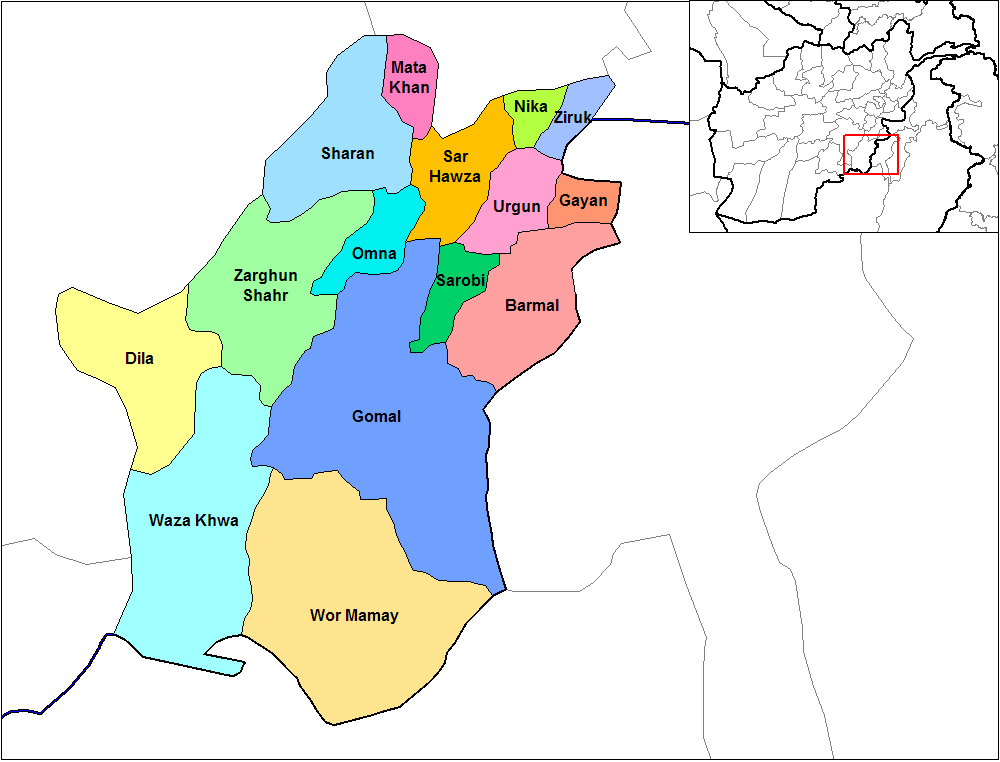
- Sar Hawza district (in orange) within the province of Paktika.

- Location in Afghanistan
- Coordinates: 33°6′52.34″N 69°7′28.97″E
- Country: Afghanistan
- Province: Paktika

Population
  - Total: 36,236
- Time zone: UTC+4:30

Sar Hawza (Pashto: سر حوزه) is a district of Paktika Province, Afghanistan.

Sar Hawza is one of the main districts of Paktika with over three thousand houses. The population is 36,236. People of Sar Hawza mostly work in business. Several Sar Hawzewal (residents of Sar Hawza) have businesses in Karachi, Saudi Arabia, Dubai, USA, UK, and other European countries.

The district was the location of an operating point (OP) for the U.S. military in support of patrols and other operations throughout the Paktika province. In 2009, Sar Hawza was center of a firefight between U.S. and Taliban forces, resulting in a Taliban commander being captured.

They have committees in Karachi, Pakistan, Saudi, Dubai, UK, and in the USA. The Saudi committee serves the people of Sar Hawza by providing shelter and guidance during the Hajj.

The district is within the heartland of the Kharoti tribe of Ghilji Pashtuns.
