= Wazakhwa =

Wazakhwa وازه خوا
- Village
- Location within Afghanistan
- Coordinates: 32°12′N 68°22′E
- Country: Afghanistan
- Province: Paktika Province
- Elevation: 2,327 m (7,635 ft)

Wāzakhwā (Pashto: وازه خوا), also known as Mashōṟêy (مشوړۍ) or Marjān (مرجان), is a village in Paktika Province, in southeastern-central Afghanistan. The town is located within the heartland of the Sulaimankhel tribe of Ghilji Pashtuns.

== See also ==
- Paktika Province
