= Khost District =

Khost District خوست ولسوالۍ
- District
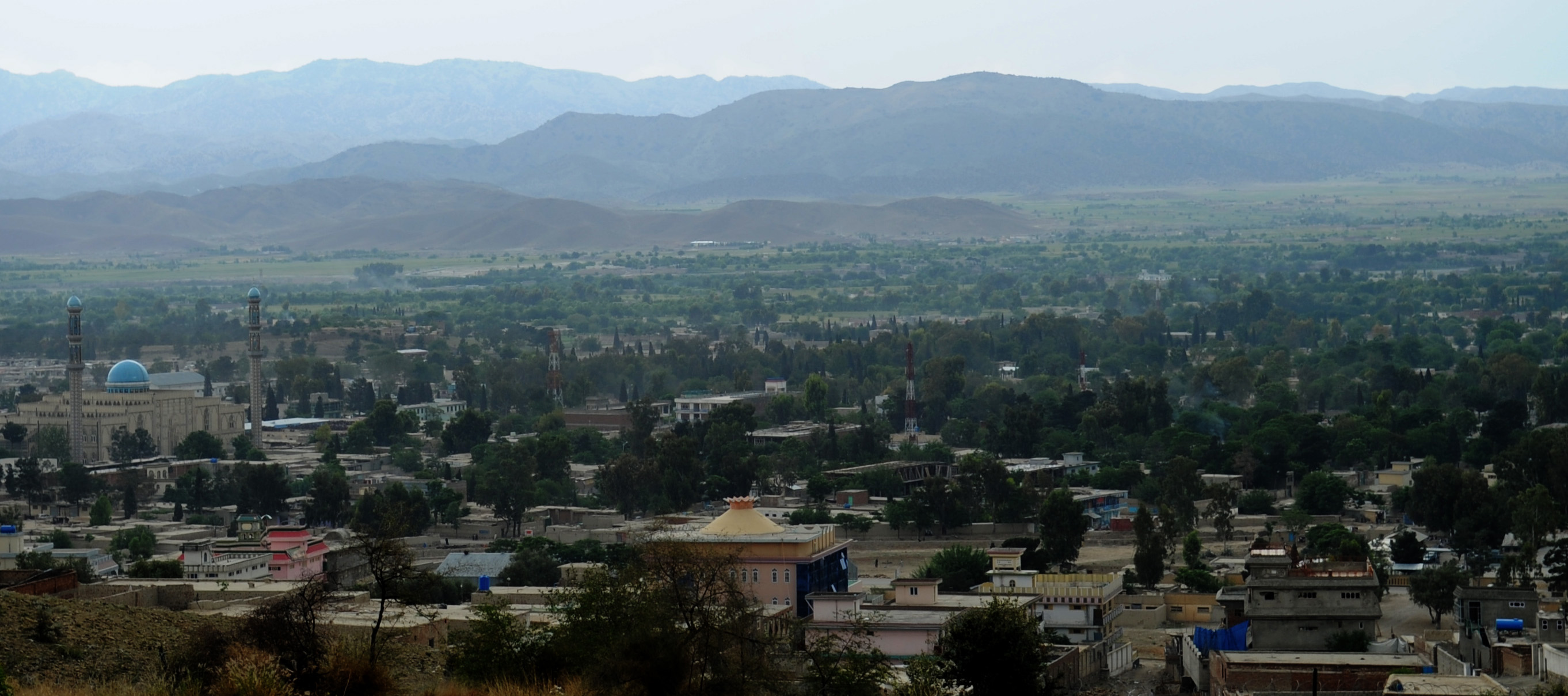
- View from the hill in Khost toward Khost Mosque

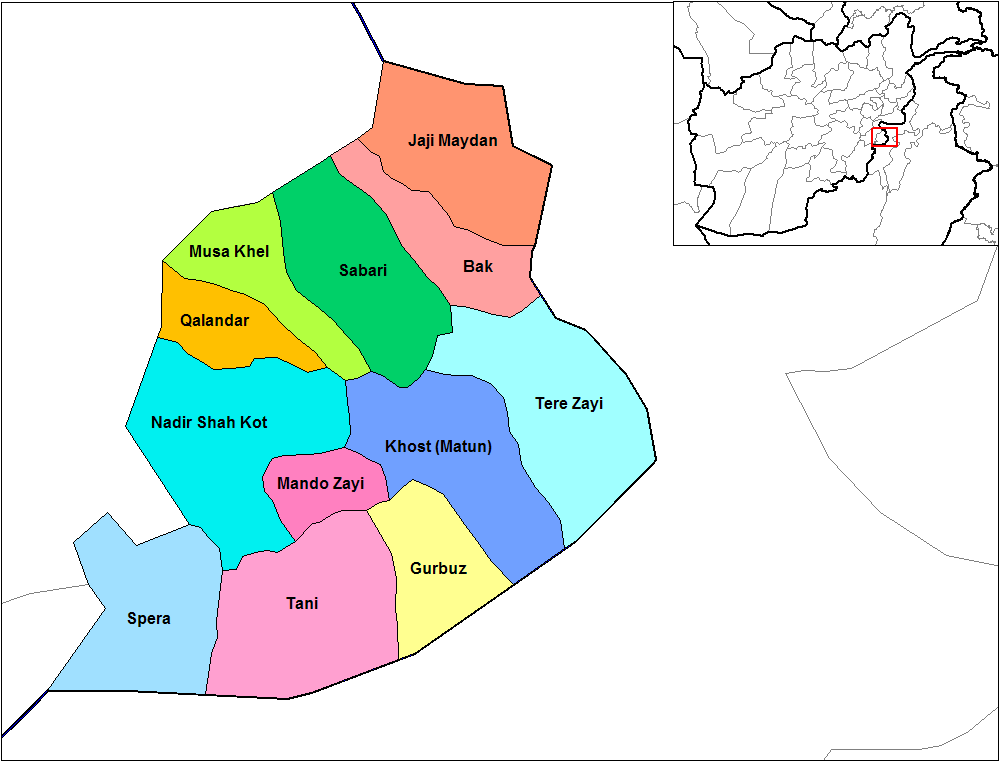

- Location in Afghanistan
- Coordinates: 35°24′00″N 70°48′00″E
- Country: Afghanistan
- Province: Khost
- Capital: Khost

Government
  - Type: District

Population (2025)
  - Total: 170,615
- Time zone: UTC+04:30 (Afghanistan Time)

Khost District (Pashto: خوست ولسوالۍ), historically known as Matun, is a municipality situated in the central and southeastern part of Khost Province in Afghanistan. It has an estimated population of 170,615 people. The cit of Khost is within the district. Shaikh Zayed University is located to the northwest of the city, and Khost International Airport is situated about 15 km (9.3 mi) to the southwest in the neighboring Mandozayi District. The main road in the district is the Khost-Gardez Highway.

== History ==
On 2 January 1879, General Roberts entered Matun from Hazir Pir in the Kurram valley, with a small armed contingent. The intent was to pacify the district, which was described as "an unsophisticated country where the revenue had hitherto been collected in copper."

During the Soviet–Afghan War, the Afghan mujahideen blockaded Khost District, cutting off all lines of communication. The Soviets were forced to respond with Operation Magistral in 1987 to reopen the Khost–Gardez Highway and bring relief to the District. Khost District was the scene of intense fighting in 1987, with over 1,500 mujahideen and one American adviser killed by DRA troops, according to Tass, the official Soviet news agency.

== See also ==
- Districts of Afghanistan
