= Janikhel District, Paktika =

District in Paktika Province in eastern Afghanistan

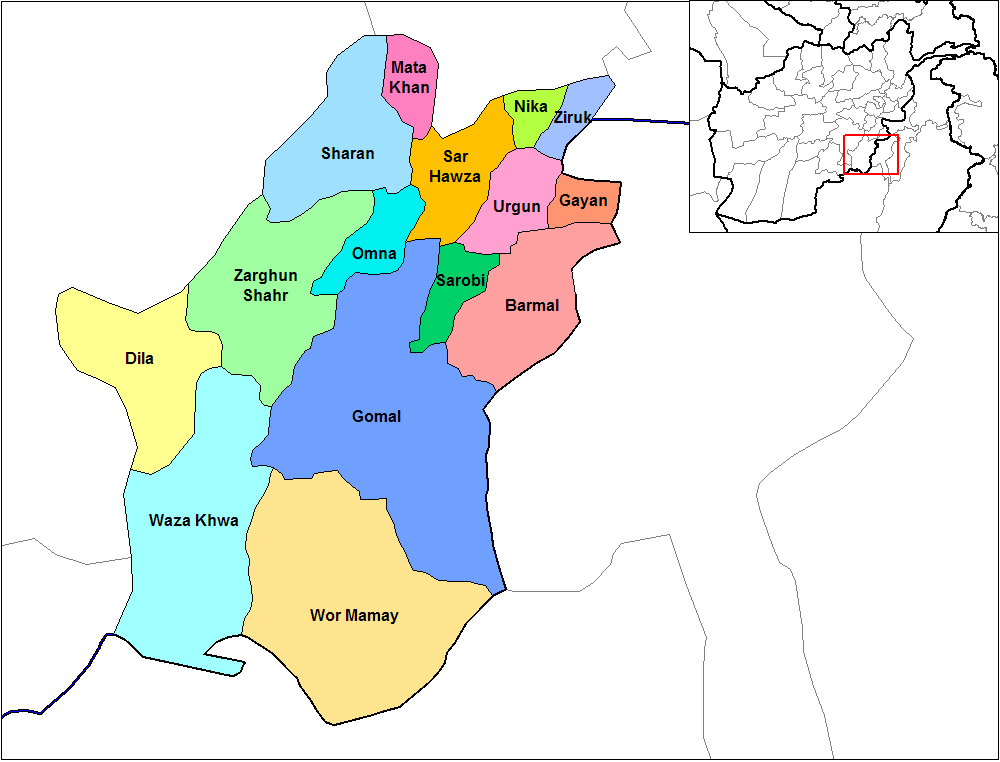
Districts of Paktika Province

Janikhel (Pashto: جاني‌خېل ولسوالۍ) is a district in Paktika Province, in eastern Afghanistan. It was created in 2004 out of a part of Khairkot District.

Like in the rest of Afghanistan, no exact population numbers are available. The Afghan Ministry of Rural Rehabilitation & Development (MRRD) along with UNHCR and Central Statistics Office (CSO) of Afghanistan estimated the population of the district to be around 36,237 (CSO 2019). According to the same sources, Pashtuns make up 100% of the total population.
