= Yusufkhel District =

District of Paktika Province, Afghanistan

Coordinates: 33.05°N 68.6458°E

Yusufkhel (Pashto: يوسف خېل ولسوالۍ) or Yosuf Khel is a district of Paktika Province, Afghanistan. The estimated population in 2019 was 28,691.
