= Gomal District =

Gomal ګومل
- District
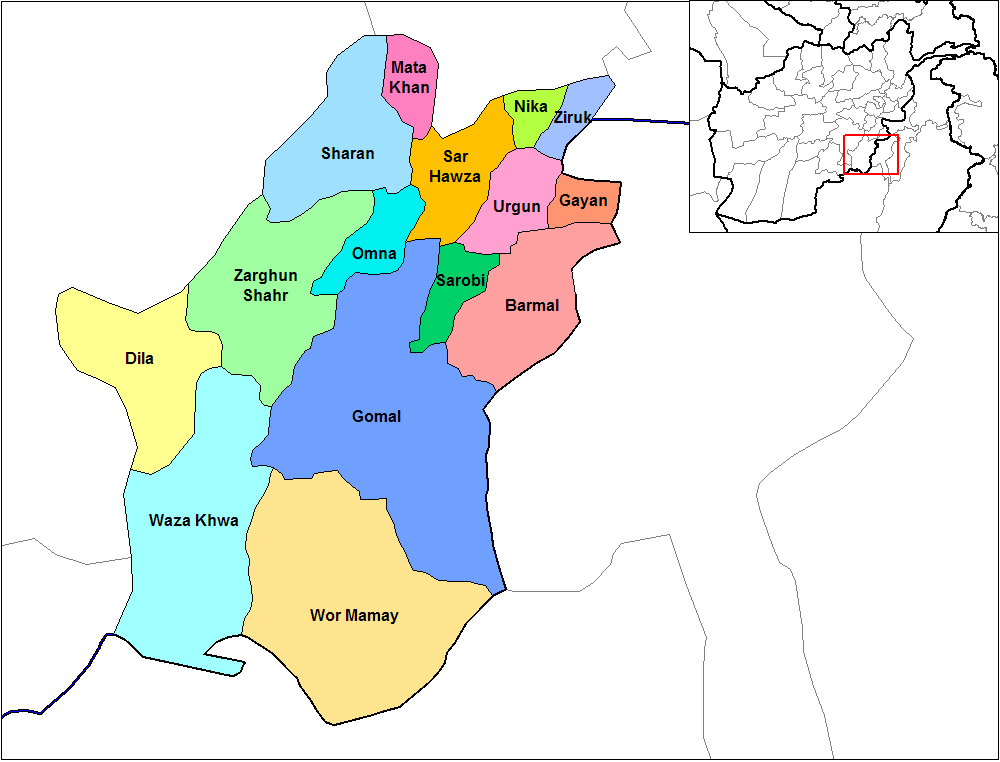
- Gomal district (in dark blue) within the province of Paktika.

- Location in Afghanistan
- Coordinates: 32°30′40″N 68°54′11″E
- Country: Afghanistan
- Province: Paktika
- Capital: Shkin

Population (2019)
  - Total: 45,873
- Time zone: UTC+4:30

Gomal District (Pashto: ګومل ولسوالۍ) is a district of Paktika Province, Afghanistan. The estimated population in 2019 was 45,873. The district is within the heartland of the Kharoti tribe of Ghilji Pashtuns.

It is named after the Gomal River.
