= Khairkot District =

District in Paktika Province, Afghanistan

Coordinates: 32°51′N 68°25′E

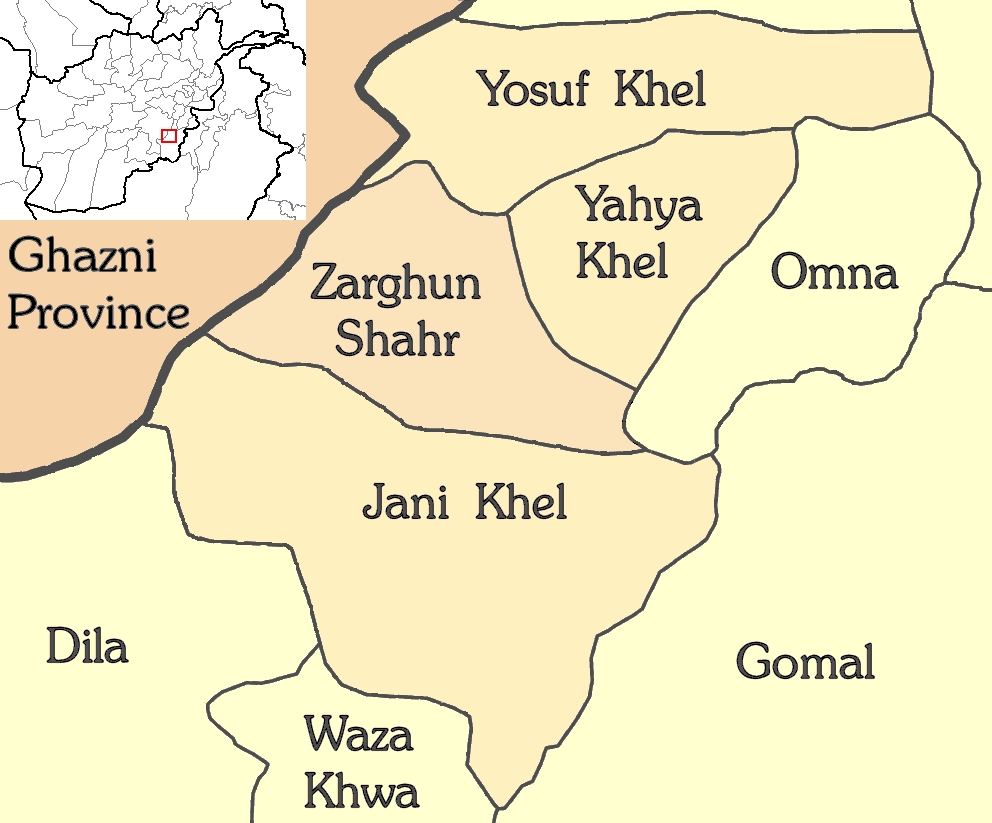
Map showing Zarghun Shahr District after 2004 division.

Khairkot District (Pashto: خیرکوټ ولسوالۍ), also known as Katawaz (کټواز) or Zarghun Shar District (Pashto: زرغونښار ولسوالۍ), is a district of Paktika Province, Afghanistan. The district is within the heartland of the Sulaimankhel tribe of Ghilji Pashtuns. The district capital is Khairkot town.

In 1998, the district had an estimated population of over 75,000. However, by June 2004 the post-Taliban government separated off three new districts from the large Khairkot District. The new districts were Janikhel District, Yahyakhel District and Yusufkhel District. The district population in 2004 of the reduced district was 38,024.

== History ==
On 3 May 2020, the Taliban threw a hand grenade into a mosque in Khairkot District, injuring 20 worshippers who were offering the night prayer after having broken their Ramadan fast.
