= Khairkot =

Coordinates: 32°50′50″N 68°26′45″E

Khairkot خیرکوټ Katawaz, Zarghun Shar
- town
- Interactive map of Khairkot
- Country: Afghanistan
- Province: Paktika Province
- District: Khairkot
- Elevation: 2,114 m (6,936 ft)
- Time zone: + 4.30

Khairkot (Pashto: خیرکوټ), also known as Zarghun Shar (زرغون‌ښار), Zarghun Shahr (زرغون‌شهر), or Katawaz (کټواز), is a town in and administrative seat of Khairkot District, Paktika Province, in eastern Afghanistan. The town is located within the heartland of the Sulaimankhel tribe of Ghilji Pashtuns.

In the 1970s Khairkot was a town of some 5,000 people, but that population decreased during the years of fighting after the Soviet invasion and the Afghan civil war.

== See also ==
- Paktika Province
