= Urgun =

Urgun اورګون
- Location in Afghanistan
- Coordinates: 32°54′2.160″N 69°09′24.840″E
- Country: Afghanistan
- Province: Paktika Province
- District: Urgun District
- Elevation: 2,315 m (7,595 ft)

Population 2014 elections
  - Total: 10,665
  - Ethnicities: Pashtuns
  - Religions: Islam/Sunni/Hanafi
- Time zone: UTC+4:30

Urgun (Pashto: اورګون) is the main town of the Urgun District of Paktika Province, Afghanistan. With an estimated population of 10,665, Urgun is the largest city of Paktika, while Urgun District, with a population of 89,718, is also the most populous district of the province. Urgun historically used to be the capital of Paktika, but in the 1970s, the capital was shifted from Urgun to Sharana in the west because Urgun was not easily accessible from the main Kabul–Kandahar Highway.

== Names ==
The town of Urgun is also called Loy Urgun (لوی اورګون), "Greater Urgun".

Like many place names in Afghanistan, Urgun can be spelled a number of different ways. Orgun, Urgin, Urgum, Urgim, Urghim, Wargun, Warghun, Arghun, Urgon, and Orgon are the most popular alternative spellings.

Urgun with some land for agriculture has recently seen progress of a poorly made road connecting it to the angorada border with Pakistan. It has also been the witness of disastrous attacks including the one that left 106 civilians dead on a single day on June 14, 2014.

== History ==
The site of a large fortress, Urgun used to be the capital of the largely undeveloped and remote province of Paktika. In the 1970s, however, the provincial capital was moved from Urgun to the town of Sharana, due to Sharana's proximity with the main highway connecting it to the larger cities and commercial centers of Kabul and Kandahar.

The Siege of Urgun during the Soviet–Afghan War took place between 1983 and 1984. It devastated the town.

== See also ==
- Loya Paktia
