= Barmal District =

District of Afghanistan

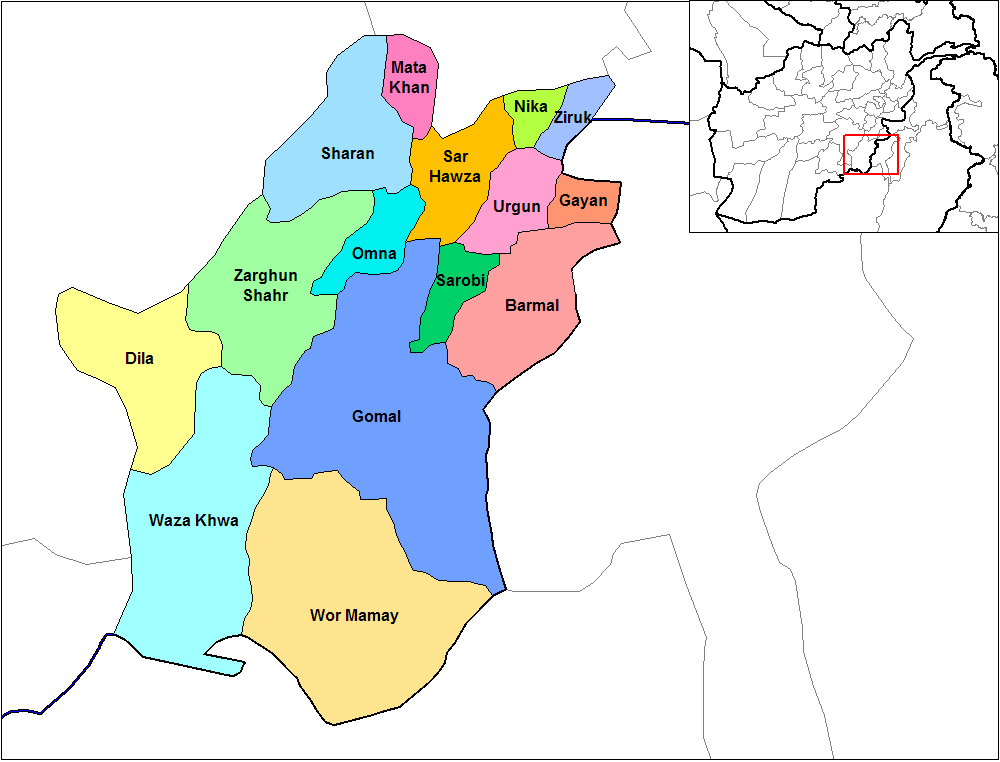
Map of Paktika Province with the district of Barmal in peach color in the upper right.

Barmal District (Pashto: برمل ولسوالۍ) is a district of Paktika Province, Afghanistan. It shares a border with Khyber Pakhtunkhwa and Balochistan, Pakistan. The Angur Ada is the official border checkpoint and border crossing between the people of Paktika and Khyber Pakhtunkhwa. The government office of Barmal District is located in Newai Ada.

== History ==
Barmal was one of the districts most affected by the 2022 Afghanistan earthquake, which killed at least 500 persons and injured a thousand others in the district. Many houses constructed primarily of mud and wood were razed to the ground. Heavy rain and the earthquake contributed to landslides that destroyed entire hamlets.

=== Construction of new earthquake-resistant houses ===
In August 2022, new "earthquake-resistant houses" began to be constructed in the district for victims of the earthquake. The project involves the establishment of 2,000 homes in both Gayan and Barmal districts of Paktika Province, including 300 houses in Spera District of neighboring Khost Province.

== Geography ==
Major towns of Barmal District are:

1. Newai Ada
2. Margha Ada
3. Laman Ada
4. Gajikhel Ada
5. Zargar Ada
6. Titoon Shaga

== Demographics ==
The population of the district in 2004 was 88,028 people. Majority of them are ethnic Pashtuns, mainly from the Wazir and Kharoti tribes.
