= Paktika Province =

Province of Afghanistan

Paktika پکتیکا
- Province
- The Afghan national flag (2002-2021) overlooks a valley from an observation post at Paktika province in Afghanistan

- Map of Afghanistan with Paktika highlighted
- Coordinates (Capital): 32.5°N 68.8°E
- Country: Afghanistan
- Capital: Sharana
- Largest city: Urgun

Government
  - Governor: Abdullah Mukhtar
  - Deputy Governor: Muhibullah Hamas

Area
  - Total: 19,515 km^{2} (7,535 sq mi)

Population (2021)
  - Total: 789,079
  - Density: 40.434/km^{2} (104.72/sq mi)
- Time zone: UTC+04:30 (Afghanistan Time)
- Postal code: 24xx
- ISO 3166 code: AF-PKA
- Main languages: Pashto

Paktika (Pashto (Note: Pashto pronunciation: [pak.t̪i.kɑ]), Dari (Note: Dari pronunciation: [pʰäk.t̪ʰɪ.kʰɑː]): پکتیکا) is one of the 34 provinces of Afghanistan, located in the eastern part of the country. Forming part of the larger Loya Paktia region, Paktika has a population of about 789,000 residents, who are mostly ethnic Pashtuns but smaller communities of Tajiks and others may also be found in the province. The town of Sharana serves as the provincial capital, while the most populous city is Urgun.

In 2021, the Taliban gained control of the province during the 2021 Taliban offensive.

== History ==
Paktika is the southernmost part of a historical region known as Greater Paktia (Pashto: لویه پکتیا, Loya Paktia), that was once a unified province including Paktia, Khost and parts of Ghazni and Logar. The tribes that reside in this area were mentioned by the Greek historian Herodotus, who called them the "Pactyans" as early as the 1st millennium BCE.

=== 20th century ===
The modern province of Paktika has its origins in the administrative reorganisation of 30 April 1964, when Afghanistan was divided into 29 provinces, replacing the previous system of fewer but larger units. At that time, the government announced plans to create a new province of Urgun and Katawaz, to be carved out of the former Governorate of Urgun (Dari: حکومت ارگون, romanized: Ḥukūmat-i Urgūn) within the High Governorate of the South. The new province was not immediately constituted, however, as the government stated it would be established only after "some constructional and developmental projects" were completed. In the meantime, the territory remained subordinate to Paktia. The proposal was still being discussed in 1966, when a geographer at the U.S. Department of State's Bureau of Intelligence and Research noted that "it has been proposed that a new province of Katawaz and Urugan be formed from part of Paktia Province", likely tied to an ongoing development plan for the region. The 1971 edition of the Times Atlas of the World does show a province of Katawaz-Urgun, and in 1973, a map of the minor civil divisions of Afghanistan published by the University of Nebraska at Omaha shows a draft map of the new province of Paktika, though later sources revert to showing Paktia in its original extent.

The province was never formally constituted. By the mid-1970s, the territory had instead been organised into the Large District of Urgun (Dari: لوی ولسوالۍ ارگون, romanized: Lōy Wōleswālī-ye Urgūn), subordinate to Paktia, and the Large District of Katawaz (Dari: لوی ولسوالۍ کتواز, romanized: Lōy Wōleswālī-ye Katawāz), subordinate to Ghazni. This arrangement was confirmed still in place in 1978 by the official yearbook of the Republic of Afghanistan. In the meantime, the provincial capital of the remote and underdeveloped region had been relocated from Urgun to Sharana, owing to the latter's more favourable position along the main highway connecting Kabul, Ghazni and Kandahar. It was only in 1979 that the modern province of Paktika was formally established by the pro-Soviet government, merging the Large District of Urgun with the Large District of Katawaz into a single new province.

Paktika was the site of many battles during the Soviet occupation of the country and the lawless years that followed. For example, the Siege of Urgun took place between 1983 and 1984.

=== Recent history ===
As one of the most remote provinces in Afghanistan and an area that saw much devastation in previous years, Paktika suffers from a severe lack of critical infrastructure. Reconstruction in the province after the fall of the Taliban has been slow compared to that in nearby provinces such as Khost and Zabul. This is primarily due to the remoteness of the region and repeated attacks on aid workers and NATO forces.

In June 2004, members of the Utah and Iowa National Guard helped Army Reserve Civil Affairs Soldiers from Oregon establish a Provincial Reconstruction Team base in Sharana, the provincial capital, to lead the development effort. The first full contingent of eight Civil Affairs Soldiers from the U.S. Army Reserve's 450th Civil Affairs Battalion (Airborne), based in Riverdale Park, Maryland, arrived in September 2004.

The Shkin firebase was composed of special operations forces. In an article from Time, the U.S. base was described as:

"The U.S. firebase looks like a Wild West cavalry fort, ringed with coils of razor wire. A U.S. flag ripples above the 3-ft.-thick mud walls, and in the watchtower a guard scans the expanse of forested ridges, rising to 9,000 ft., that mark the border. When there's trouble, it usually comes from that direction."

While the province hasn't witnessed the outright fighting in the last few years that has affected provinces like Helmand, there is a constant low level of tribal violence, accompanied by criminal and Taliban activity. The last serious fighting in the province took place in 2004, amid reports that then-Governor Muhammad Ali Jalali was collaborating with Taliban forces, and that the Taliban had effectively annexed eastern portions of the province. Jalali and many of his allied officials, were replaced and U.S. Special Forces were dispatched to fight the Taliban while the Pakistani forces fought with the Taliban's allies in neighbouring South Waziristan.

A convoy with members of Task Force 2–28, 172nd Infantry Brigade and the Afghan National Army winds its way through a small valley on its way back to Forward Operating Base Orgun-E from Combat Outpost Zerok. (2011)

On 1 November 2004, a civil affairs convoy was ambushed near Surobi, between the Shkin firebase and Orgun-E. U.S. Army Spc. James Kearney, a turret gunner, died of a head shot from a sniper, which initiated the ambush. Two vehicles were destroyed in the engagement and three other Soldiers were wounded. The Provincial Reconstruction Team base was named Camp Kearney on 21 November 2004 to honor the sacrifice of Spc. James Kearney.

A member of the US military inside a military base in 2012

On Jun 18, 2008 in the Ziruk District Governor's compound, two members of the Provincial Reconstruction Team, HMN Mark Retmier and CM1 Ross Toles, were killed due to rocket attacks. The mess hall on Forward Operating Base Sharana was named after CM1 Toles and the hospital was named after HMN Retmier.

Kearney Base became the nucleus of what is now Forward Operating Base Sharana.

On July 4, 2009, combat outpost Zerok in East Paktika Province was attacked. The Haqqani network insurgents attacked the COP using mortars, accurate heavy machine gun fire, RPG fire, recoils rifles, and a 5000 lb Jingle Truck VBIED that destroyed the outpost's radio communication. The accurate enemy indirect fire from their mortars set the US mortar pit on fire, and killed two Able Company, 3rd Battalion 509th parachute Infantry regiment mortarmen, PFC Casillas and PFC Fairbairn. They were both returning fire on the 120 mm mortar. After the VBIED went off, multiple insurgents began maneuvering towards the outpost, some getting within 100 meters of the cop. Because the enemy was advancing so close to the outpost, the request for CAS was called in, but because of the DUSTWUN (large scale search) for PFC Bergdahl, (who went AWOL after abandoning his post only 100 km away from COP Zerok), air support was delayed. After intense fighting the US Paratroopers suppressed and killed most of the enemy, eventually gunships arrived and JDAMs were dropped on enemy targets.

In 2010 the 101st Rakkasan air assault took over COP Zerok. 60 minutes produced a TV special documenting the unit's takeover of the COP, entitled COP Zerok.

In late July 2011, foreign troops and Afghan special forces killed more than 50 insurgents during an operation in eastern Paktika to clear a training camp the Haqqani network used for foreign fighters, NATO said. Disenfranchised insurgents told security forces where the camp was located, the coalition said.

In November 2011, an estimated 60 to 70 Taliban insurgents were killed in an abortive attack on a joint Afghan-ISAF base in the Margha area of Barmal. No international troops were killed or injured in the incident. It is believed the insurgents crossed over from neighboring FATA and Balochistan of Pakistan. In a separate incident the governor of Sar Hawza district died in the same month after his vehicle struck a roadside bomb. Civilians have also been killed by the foreign forces.

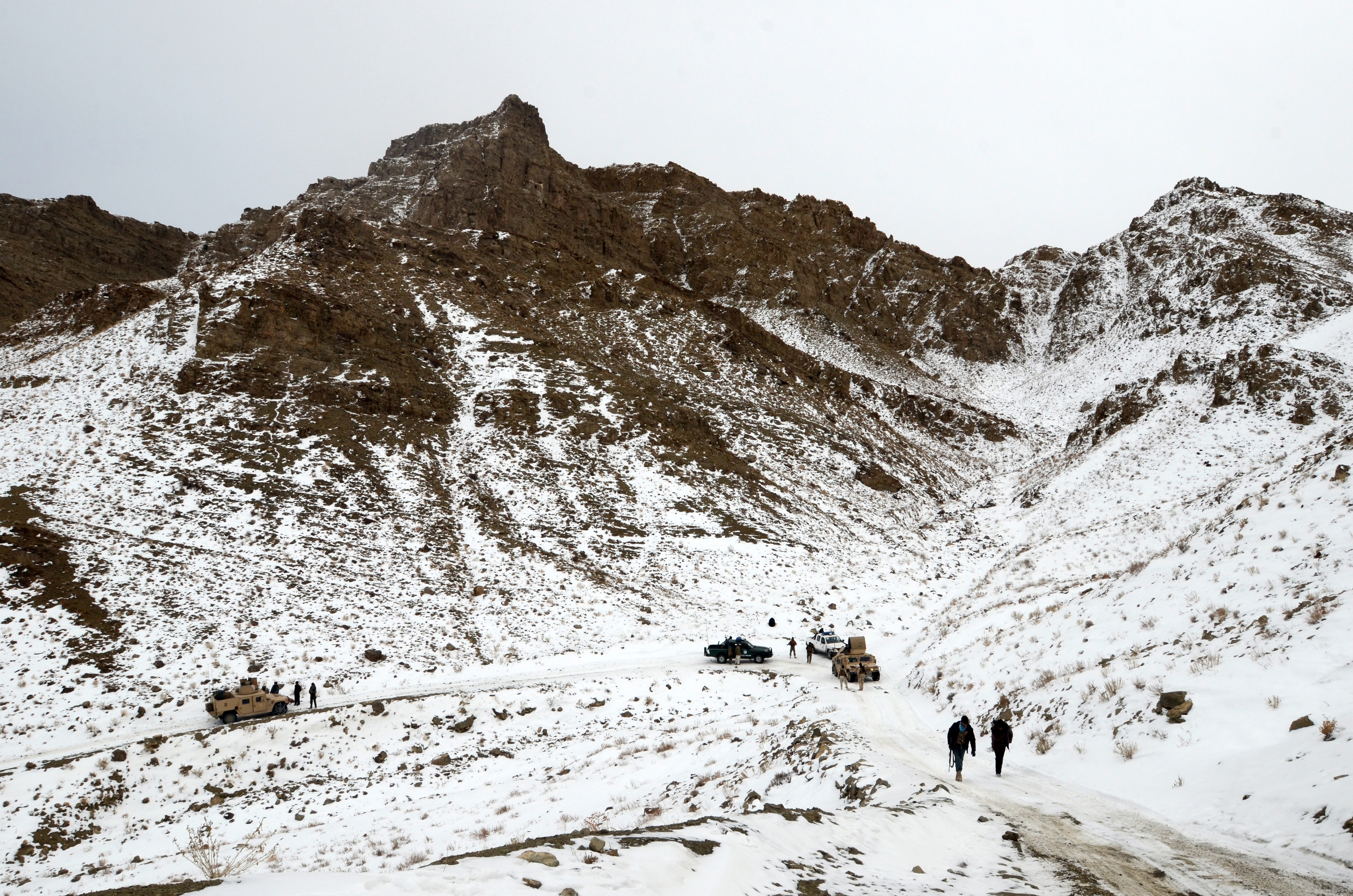
Afghan Local Police and ANSF moving up a mountain pass

In the spring of 2012 the 172nd Infantry Brigade opened the first Afghan National Army/ US Joint Artillery Fire Base in the Orgun District.

In early 2013 10th Mountain Division, 2–14th Infantry, Golden Dragons, took over FOB Zerok.

Eight civilians including a pregnant woman and a baby died when Polish soldiers shelled the village of Nangar Khel, where a wedding celebration was taking place. Seven Polish soldiers have been charged with war crimes for allegedly opening fire in revenge.

U.S. Army PFC Bowe Bergdahl turned himself in to the Taliban on July 4, 2009, somewhere between OP Mest, near the town of Yahya Khel, and FOB Sharana. He was freed in a prisoner trade on May 31, 2014.

Paktika was one of the provinces most affected by the 2022 Afghanistan earthquake on 22 June 2022. In Gayan District, approximately 1,800 homes, or 70 percent of the district's homes, were destroyed, and 238 people were killed, with 393 others injured. In Barmal District, at least 500 people died, with a thousand others injured. Many houses constructed primarily of mud and wood were razed to the ground. Heavy rain and the earthquake contributed to landslides that destroyed entire hamlets. The local clinic in Gayan, which had the capacity of only five patients, was also heavily damaged. Of the about 500 patients admitted to the clinic due to the earthquake, about 200 died. Three days later, an aftershock killed five persons and wounded 11 more in Gayan District.

== Geography ==
Paktika sits adjacent to the Durand Line border between Pakistan and Afghanistan. It is bordered by the Khost and Paktia provinces to the north. The western border is shared with the provinces of Ghazni and Zabul. The South Waziristan and North Waziristan agencies are to the east of Paktika, while Zhob District of the Balochistan province of Pakistan borders it the southeast. The Shinkay Hills run through the center of Paktika; Toba Kakar Range runs along the border with Pakistan. The Southern districts are intermittently irrigated and cultivated, the center and north are used primarily for rangeland. There are natural forests in Ziruk, Nika, Gayan, and Bermal districts

Paktika, like many other areas of Afghanistan, has been severely deforested. This has been a cause of devastating floods in recent years. The province is mainly hilly and interspersed with seasonal river valleys. In the north, the terrain gains elevation and becomes more rugged. In the west, the Rowd-e Lurah River originates in the mountainous Omna District and flows southwest to the Ghazni Province, forming a shallow river valley that dominates the topography in the Khairkot, Jani Khel, and Dila Districts. The terrain in Omna becomes more hilly further east in proximity to Pakistan. The sparsely populated southern districts are also hilly, with descending elevation towards the south and west.

The Gomal River, which has a varied flow depending on season, runs from its origin in the mountains of the Sar Hawza District and flows south, before turning southeast to the Pakistani border, forming the broad river valley that defines the topography of the Gomal District, before flowing east through Pakistan and eventually running to the powerful Indus River.

== Administrative divisions ==
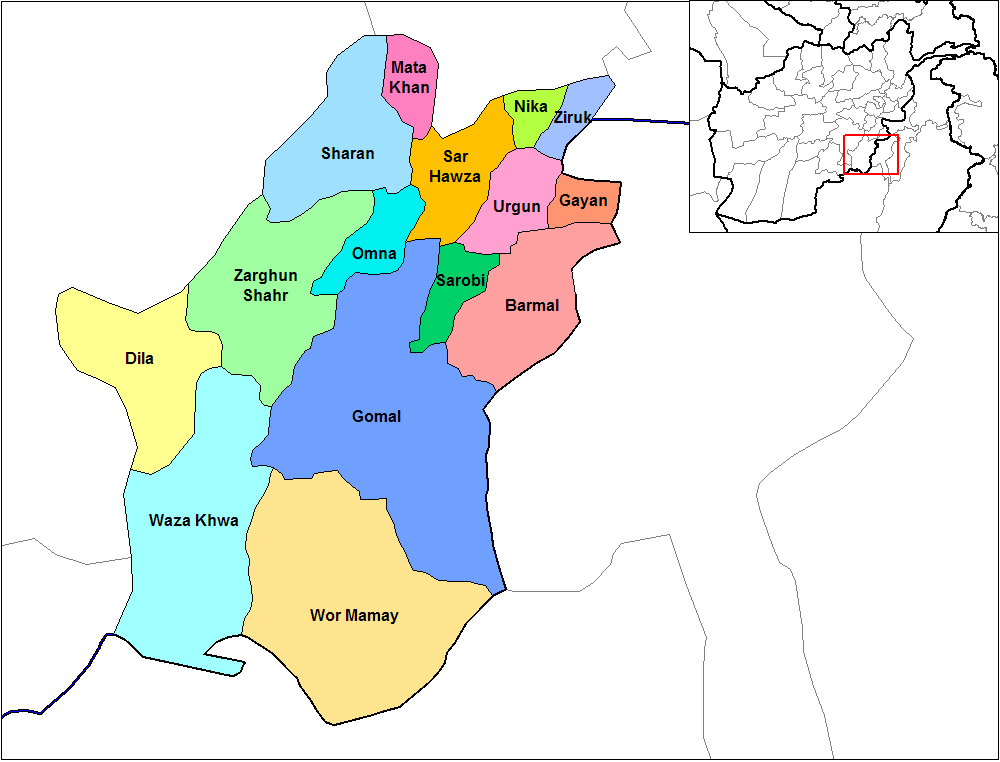
Map of the districts of Paktika as of January 2004, prior to the redrawing of provincial and district boundaries later that year

District	Capital	Population	Area	Pop. density	Notes
Barmal	Angur Ada	78,351	952	81	100% Pashtun. Includes Barmal, Shkin & Margha Cities.
Dila		77,006	952	81	100% Pashtun.
Gayan		47,848	1,372	35	100% Pashtun.
Gomal	Shkin	46.586	4,108	11	100% Pashtun.
Janikhel		36,873	1,052	35	100% Pashtun. Created in 2004 within Khairkot District.
Khairkot (Zarghun Shar or Katawaz)	Khairkot	42,044	403	105	100% Pashtun. Sub-divided in 2004.
Mata Khan		27,189	405	67	Predominantely Pashtun, few Tajik.
Nika		17,041	129	132	100% Pashtun.
Omna		23,811	468	51	100% Pashtun.
Sar Hawza		37,053	707	52	100% Pashtun.
Surobi		38,855	451	86	100% Pashtun.
Sharana	Sharana	64,774	487	133	Predominantely Pashtun, few Tajik and Hazara.
Terwa		11,266	1,034	11	100% Pashtun. Created in 2004 within Waza Khwa District.
Urgun	Urgun	90,549	481	188	Mixed Pashtun and Tajik.
Wazakhwa	Wazakhwa	46,647	2,336	20	100% Pashtun. Sub-divided in 2004
Wor Mamay		21,777	3,052	7	100% Pashtun.
Yahyakhel		29,771	321	93	100% Pashtun. Created in 2004 within Khairkot District.
Yusufkhel		29,193	590	50	100% Pashtun. Created in 2004 within Khairkot District.
Zerok	Zerok	39,415	274	144	100% Pashtun.
Paktika		775,498	19,516	40	96.4% Pashtuns, 3.6% Tajiks, <0.1% Hazaras. (Note: Note: "Predominantely" or "dominated" is interpreted as 99%, "majority" as 70%, "mixed" as 1/(number of ethnicities), "minority" as 30% and "few" or "some" as 1%.)

== Economy ==
As of May 2014, Paktika had regularly scheduled passenger flights to Kabul from Sharana Airstrip. The province's development is considered backwards compared to the rest of the country but work on some development projects have recently began.

== Demographics ==
=== Population ===
As of 2021, the total population of the province is about 789,000. The overwhelming majority of Paktika's population (around 99%) live in rural districts. The capital city, Sharana, has around 54,400 inhabitants. The majority of Pakikta's Districts have between 25,000 and 55,000 inhabitants. Only two districts, Nika and Turwo have less than 20,000 inhabitants, with a little more than 15,000 apiece. Two of the least mountainous districts, Urgun and neighboring Barmal have nearly 90,000 inhabitants each. There are around 115,000 households, with eight members apiece, in the Province.

=== Ethnicity, languages and religion ===
Paktika is a multi-ethnic tribal society. According to the Naval Postgraduate School, the ethnic groups of the province are as follows: Pashtun, Tajik, Arab, Pashai, and other various minority groups. Other sources mention that ethnic Pashtuns make up around 96% of Paktika's population. Around 15,000 people (0.17%) are ethnic Uzbeks; and about 5,000 people speak some other languages. There is also a small Tajik community in Urgun.

Estimated ethnolinguistic and -religious composition
Ethnicity	Pashtun	Tajik/ Farsiwan	Arab	Pashayi	Others	Sources
Period	Pashtun	Tajik/ Farsiwan	Arab	Pashayi	Others	Sources

2004–2021 (Islamic Republic)	91 – >96%	≤9%	≤1%	≤1%	∅
2020 EU	1st	2nd	–	–	–
2018 UN	majority	–	–	–	–
2015 CSSF (Note: Demographic information is based on data from 2015.)	91%	9%	1%	1%	–
2015 NPS	∅	∅	∅	∅	∅
2011 PRT	>96% (Note: excl. Kochi.)	–	–	–	∅ (Note: incl. Uzbek.)
2011 USA	majority	–	–	–	–
2009 ISW	majority	∅	∅	∅	–

Legend:
- ∅: Ethnicity mentioned in source but not quantified
- –: Ethnicity not mentioned specifically
- Source abbreviations: Empirical sources: –, Government sources: EU – European Union Agency for Asylum, MRRD – Ministry of Rural Rehabilitation and Development, PRT – Provincial Reconstruction Team of the United States government, UN – United Nations Assistance Mission in Afghanistan, Editorial sources: CSSF – Center for the Scientific Study of Families, ISW – Institute for the Study of War, NPS – Naval Postgraduate School, USA – United States Army

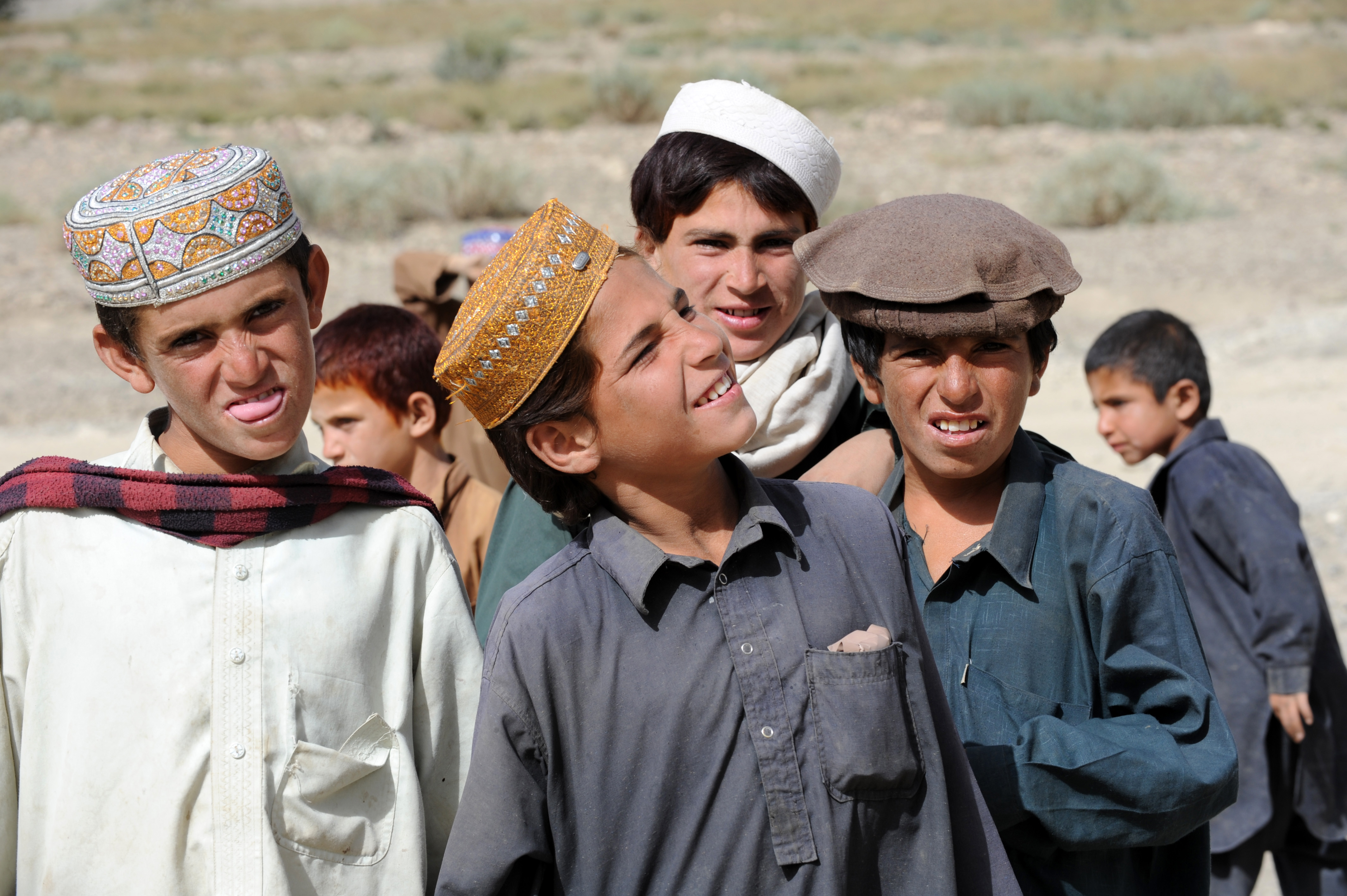
Local Afghan children observe U.S. Army Special Forces and Afghan National Police as they patrol the area to improve security and increase stability in the village of Rabat.

Local Afghans leaving the village of Rabat, hauling firewood in their pickup

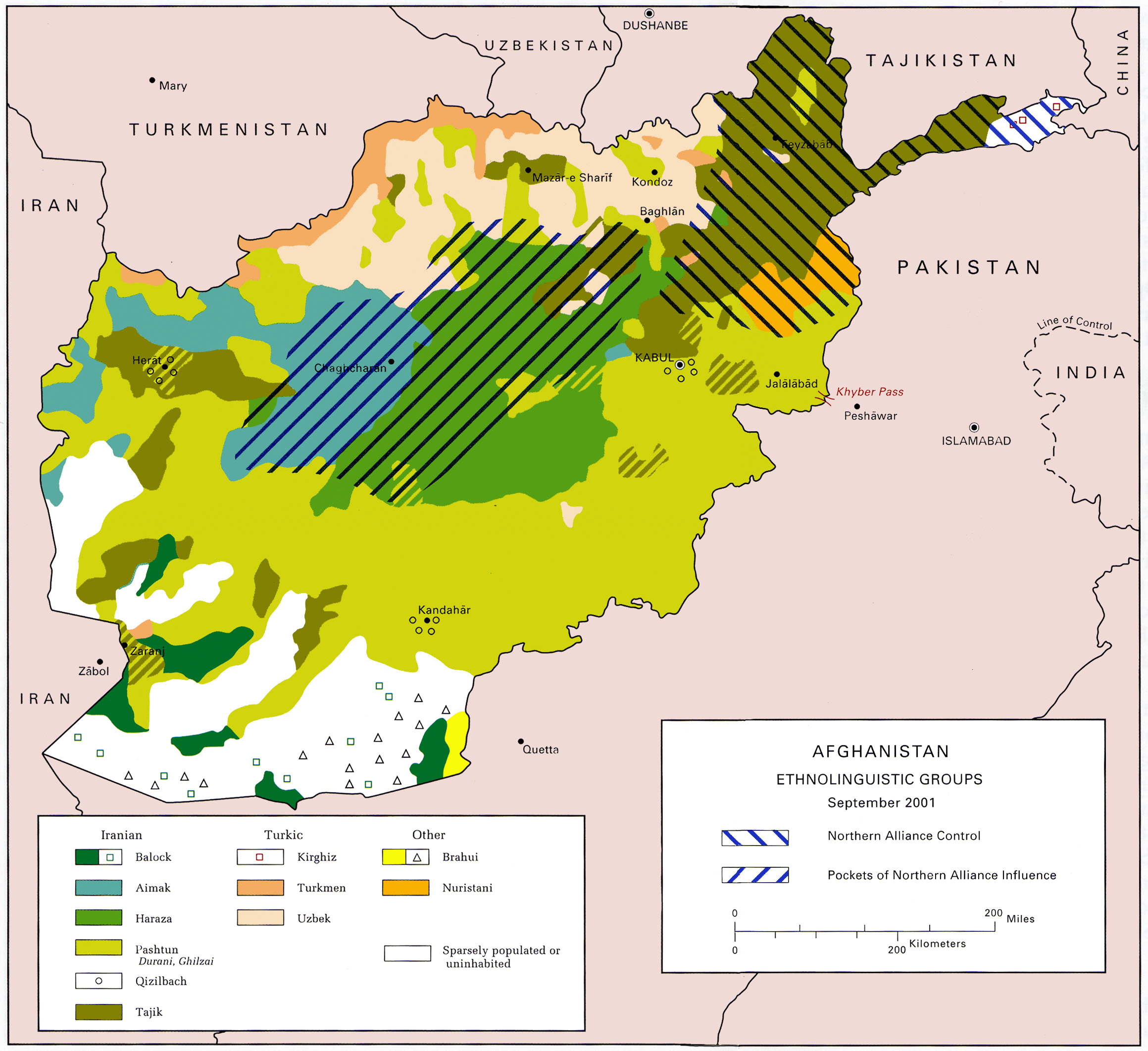
Ethnolinguistic groups of Afghanistan

== See also ==
- Provinces of Afghanistan
- Pakhtas
