= Sulaimankhel =

Khilji Pashtun tribe

The Sulaimankhel (Pashto: سليمان خېل), or Suleiman Khel, are a Pashtun sub-tribe of the Khilji tribe. As they are primarily Nomadic People. In the early 20th century, the tribe was recognized as generally pastoral.

== History ==
In 1924, Sulaimankhel took part in the Khost Rebellion standing beside King Amanullah Khan led by the Dustukhel sub-tribe of Sulaimankhel. The population of this tribe mainly lives in Afghanistan, Pakistan, and parts of India. (Alikhel), Umer Khel, is a brother tribe of the Slemakhel tribe. Former Paktika governor Gulab Mangal said Sulaimankhel provided most of the Taliban's and Democratic Republic of Afghanistan recruits in the province. As a result, the level of activity of anti-coalition militias remains high in areas controlled by Sulemankhel. The prejudice of some sub-tribes against the Taliban may be explained, in part, by their proximity to the Pakistani border, influx of insurgents and extremist politics. Umer Khel is also one of the well-known tribes of Pakistan along with a few other tribes. They have allied with the Hotaki in the past, and their traditional rivals include the kharoti. The main subdivisions of Slemankhel include, (Sultankhel),(Gulwal) (Khazarkhel), (Nazarkhel), (Alizai), (Dustukhel), (Slemanzai),(Srazkhel), (Ahmadzai), (khojak khel),(Jalalzai), and (Kasarkhel). included. Other subdivisions include (Alikhel), (Nizamkhel), and (Dinnarkhel), with Shakhel, who live primarily in northwestern Paktika, being more cooperative with the central government and coalition forces. Nizamkhel and Shakhel also continue to be more supportive of the government, which may be partially explained by their conflict with Jalalzai. Sulaimankhel also has a strong presence in Swat, Haripur, Abbottabad, Mansehra, Quetta, Gwadar, Peshawar, Ghazni, Zabul, Paktia, Ghost, Logar, Wardak, Kabul, Nangarhar and Helmand. Haji Maula Nazar Dustukhel is the current chief of the Sulaimankhel tribe's in Afghanistan and Pakistan. Many Sulemankhel Kochis also live in Kunduz, Nangarhar, Kabul, Bannu, Peshawar, Attock, Haripur, Quetta, Kandahar, Maidan, Helmand, Lahore, Karachi, and Herat. .

== Culture ==
All of the subtribes of Sulemankhel are known for their strict following of Pakhtunwali. Most prominent Sulemankhel subtribes strictly follow its practice of Pashtunwali and are known for dispute resolution. Haji Allah Nazar Dustukhel Chief of Dustukhel's laid the foundation and brought amendments in the system to be up to date according to the new era. It's a pre-Islamic tradition, also known for being the strongest tribesmen, dating back to Alexander's defeat of the Persian Empire in 330 BC, possibly survived in the form of traditional dances, while literary styles and music. Sulaimankhel tribe follows the principles of Pushtunwali tradition rigidly. Tribe has frequent blood feuds. Most of the population still lacks proper education which results in a high illiteracy.

== Notable people ==
- Azad Khan Afghan, Pashtun ruler and contender for supremacy in Persia
- Sulaiman Layeq, Afghan Parcham politician
- Zaman Khan, Pakistani cricketer
