= Zambar =

Zambar may refer to:

== Geography ==
- Zambar (river), a river of Tajikistan
- Zambar, Afghanistan, a settlement in Sabari District, Khost Province, Afghanistan
- Zambar, Iran, a settlement in Markazi Province, Iran
- Zambar, Iraq, a settlement in Neineva Province, Iraq
- Zambar, Uzbekistan, a settlement in Sirdaryo Region, Uzbekistan
- Zambara, a settlement in Central Region, Malawi
- Jabal Zambar, a mountain of Iraq
- Zambar Toy, river of Khost Province, Afghanistan

== Other uses ==
- Zambar (restaurant), an Indian restaurant in Gurgaon
- Zambar (tiger), an Amur Tiger at Blackpool Zoo
- Moshe Zambar, former governor of the Bank of Israel
