= Ahmadabad District =

Ahmadabad District may refer to:

- Ahmad Aba District, Afghanistan
- Ahmadabad District (Iran)
- Ahmedabad district, India
