= Kuz Kunar District =

Kuz Kunar District Khewa
- District
- کوز کونړ
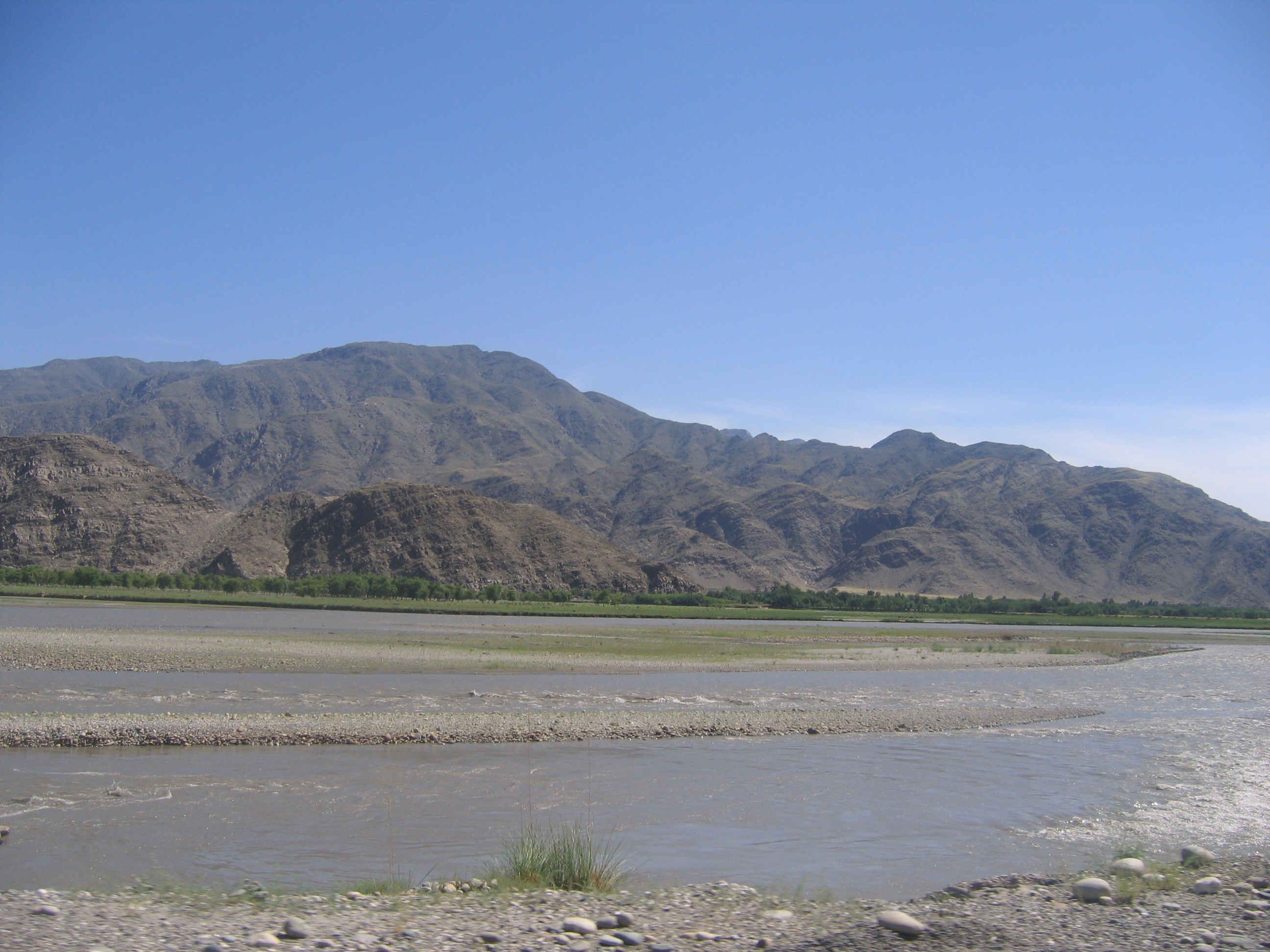

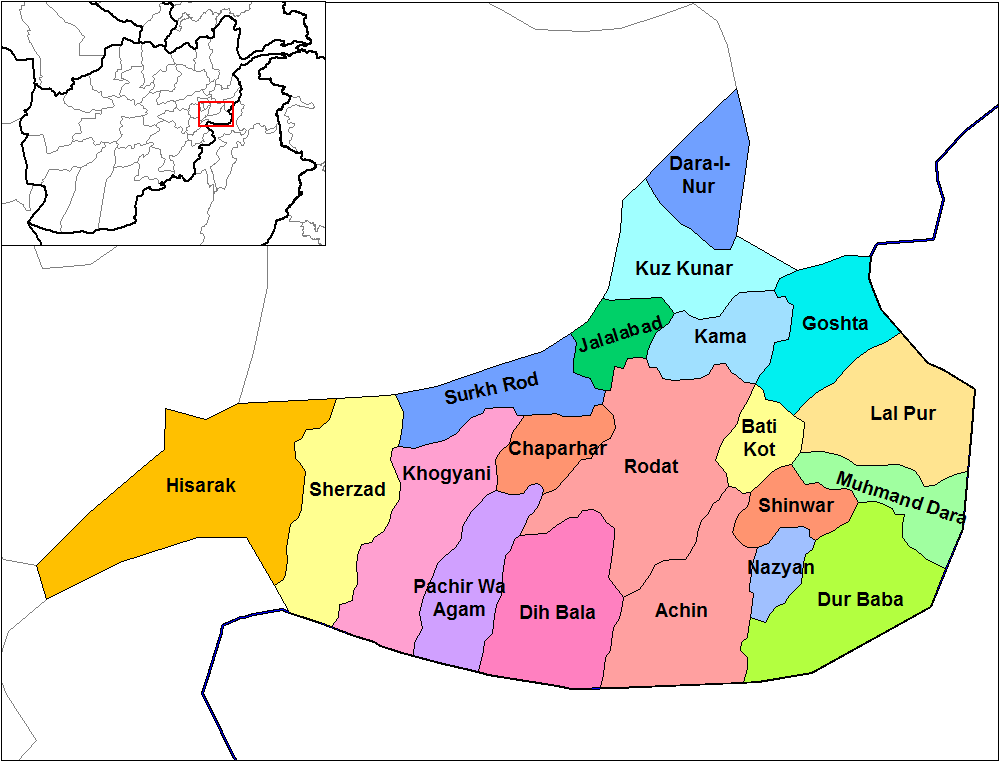
- Kuz Kunar District is located in the north-west of Nangarhar Province.
- Country: Afghanistan
- Province: Nangarhar Province
- District center: Khewa

Population (2002)
  - Total: 167,640
- Time zone: UTC+4:30 (D† (Afghanistan Standard Time))

Kuz Kunar (Pashto: کوز کونړ, lit. "Lower Kunar") is a district in the north of Nangarhar Province, Afghanistan, on the Kunar River. It is counted one of the more secure districts of Nangarhar, where many foreigners go to visit the social, agricultural and structural rehabilitation of the area. Its population, which is 75% Pashtun, was estimated at 167,640 in 2002, of whom 32,000 were children under 12.

== History ==
On 12 May 2020, a suicide bombing took place in Kuz Kunar District at the funeral of Shaikh Akram, a former commander of the district's police force, who had died of a heart attack a day earlier. The blast killed 32 people and injured 133 others, some severely. Abdullah Malikzai, a member of Nangarhar's provincial council, was killed in the attack, while his father, Malik Qais Noor Agha, a lawmaker, was wounded. Islamic State of Iraq and the Levant – Khorasan Province (ISIL–KP) claimed responsibility for the attack. However, the Afghan government claimed that the Taliban and the affiliated Haqqani network were behind the attack.
