= Mezana District =

District of Zabul Province, Afghanistan

Mizan میزان
- District
- Location within Afghanistan
- Country: Afghanistan
- Province: Zabul

Mezana (Pashto: میزانه) or Mizan is a district of Zabul province in southern Afghanistan.

== Demographics ==
It has a population of about 13,400 as of 2013. The district is mostly populated by the Hotak tribe of Ghilji Pashtuns.

== History ==
On 18 May 2020, a roadside IED planted by militants in Mezana District killed four civilians and injured nine others.

== See also ==
- Districts of Afghanistan
