= Zambara =

- Village
- Location in Malawi
- Coordinates: 13°17′S 34°1′E
- Country: Malawi
- Region: Central
- District: Ntchisi District

Zambara is a village in Ntchisi District in the Central Region of Malawi. It is located about 90 kilometres (56 mi) by road northeast of Lilongwe and about 80 kilometres (50 mi) southeast of Kasungu. Ntchisi Forest Reserve lies to the east.
