= Mes Aynak mine =

Copper mine in Logar, Afghanistan

- Interactive map of Mes Aynak mine
- Location: Logar Province, Afghanistan; 34°16′03″N 69°17′33″E
- Products: Copper

The Mes Aynak mine is a large copper mine located in the east of Afghanistan in Logar Province. Mes Aynak represents one of the largest copper reserve in Afghanistan and in the world having estimated reserves of 690 million tonnes of ore grading 1.65% copper.

== History ==
In 1974, the copper mines of Aynak, Darband and Jawkhar were re-discovered when Russian geologists mapped the Kabul area. The Soviet Geological Mission conducted detailed exploration of Aynak between 1974 and 1976, then again from 1978–1989. In 1989 the Russian advisors withdrew and with the subsequent civil war, work in the mines was halted. In 2008 a Chinese company, MJAM-MCC, was awarded a contract by the government of Afghanistan to mine copper.

On 17 May 2020, the Taliban attacked a security checkpoint near the Mes Aynak mine. Eight security guards were killed and five others wounded.
