= May 2020 Afghanistan attacks =

- Part of the War in Afghanistan (2001–2021)
- May 2020 Afghanistan attacks (Afghanistan)
- Location: Zari, Balkh; Grishk, Helmand; Khairkot, Paktika; Kandahar; Khost; Alishing, Laghman; Kabul; Kuz Kunar, Nangarhar; Gardez, Paktia; Firozkoh, Ghor; Ghazni; Mezana, Zabul; Kunduz; Charikar, Parwan; Khwaja Bahauddin, Takhar; Farah
- Date: May 2020
- Attack type: Mass shooting, grenades (Kabul hospital); Suicide bombing (Kuz Kunar funeral); Suicide truck bombing (Grishk, Gardez); Suicide Humvee bombing (Ghazni); Gunfight (Zari, Alishing, Firozkoh, Ahmad Aba, Mes Aynak, Khwaja Bahauddin, Farah, Dand Aw Patan); Motorbike bombing (Mihtarlam); Hand grenade throwing (Khairkot); Roadside IED explosion (northern Kabul, Nadir Shah Kot, Khost, Mezana, Kabul bus); Assassination (Kandahar); Mass shooting, torching of bodies (Jaghatū); Motorbike bombing, gunfight (Kunduz); Mass shooting (Charikar, Sabari); Torching of checkpoint, gunfight (Ghorband)
- Deaths: Zari: 13; Mihtarlam: 3 Grishk: 7 (+1); Kandahar: 1 Nadir Shah Kot, Khost: 3 Alishing: 27; Kabul hospital: 24 (+3); Kuz Kunar funeral: 32 (+1); Gardez: 5 (+1); Firozkoh: 3 Ahmad Aba, Paktia: 8 (+9); Mes Aynak: 8 Ghazni: 9 (+1); Jaghatū, Ghazni: 5 Mezana: 4 Kunduz: 13 (+10); Charikar: 11; Sabari, Khost: 3 Khwaja Bahauddin: 9 Ghorband, Parwan: 7 (+1); Farah: 7 (+8); Dand Aw Patan, Paktia: 14 (+2); Kabul bus: 2 Total: 218 (+37)
- Injuries: 17 (Zari); 4 (Mihtarlam); 12 (Grishk); 20 (Khairkot); 4 (Northern Kabul); 1 (Nadir Shah Kot); 15 (Kabul hospital); 133 (Kuz Kunar funeral); 29 (Gardez); 9 (Ahmad Aba); 6 (Khost); 5 (Mes Aynak); 40 (Ghazni); 9 (Mezana); 73 (Kunduz); 16 (Charikar); 1 (Sabari); 6 (Khwaja Bahauddin); 1 (Ghorband); 3 (Dand Aw Patan); 7 (Kabul bus); Total: 411
- Perpetrators: Unknown (Mihtarlam, northern Kabul, Kandahar, Kabul hospital, Khost, Jaghatū, Mezana, Charikar, Sabari); ISIL–KP (Kuz Kunar funeral, Kabul bus); Taliban (Zari, Grishk, Khairkot, Nadir Shah Kot, Alishing, Gardez, Firozkoh, Ahmad Aba, Mes Aynak, Ghazni, Kunduz, Khwaja Bahauddin, Ghorband, Farah, Dand Aw Patan)

In May 2020, a series of insurgent attacks took place in Afghanistan, starting with the Taliban killing 20 Afghan soldiers and wounded 29 others in Zari, Balkh and Grishk, Helmand on 1 and 3 May, respectively. On 12 May, a hospital's maternity ward in Kabul and a funeral in Kuz Kunar (Khewa), Nangarhar were attacked, resulting in the death of 56 people and injuries of 148 others, including newborn babies, mothers, nurses, and mourners. ISIL–KP claimed responsibility for the funeral bombing, but no insurgent group claimed responsibility for the maternity ward shooting.

The Afghan government blamed the Taliban as the main perpetrators behind the 12 May attacks, and immediately ordered the military to resume its offensives against the Taliban and other insurgent groups. The Taliban, however, denied involvement. The U.S. government said that ISIL–KP conducted the 12 May attacks, not the Taliban, but this assertion was rejected by Afghan officials.

The Taliban announced that it would conduct revenge attacks against the Afghan government for blaming it for the 12 May attacks, and conducted suicide bombings in Gardez and Ghazni, which killed nine intelligence personnel and five civilians, and wounded 69 others. The Taliban then attempted to capture Kunduz, attacking several government posts in the city during which eight soldiers, four civilians, and a policeman were killed, and 73 others were injured. The Taliban attack on Kunduz was repelled by the Afghan security forces.

== Background ==
On 29 February 2020, the U.S. signed a peace agreement with the Taliban in Qatar, which set the conditions for the withdrawal of U.S. troops from Afghanistan. However, despite the agreement, attacks against Afghan security forces surged in the country. In the 45 days after the agreement (between 1 March and 15 April), the Taliban conducted more than 4,500 attacks in Afghanistan, an increase of more than 70% over the same period the previous year. More than 900 Afghan security forces were killed in the period, up from about 520 in the same period a year earlier. Meanwhile, because of a significant reduction in the number of offensives and airstrikes by Afghan and U.S. forces against the Taliban due to the agreement, Taliban casualties dropped to 610 in the period, down from about 1,660 in the same period a year earlier. The Pentagon spokesman, Jonathan Hoffman, said that although the Taliban stopped conducting attacks against the U.S.-led coalition forces in Afghanistan, the violence was still "unacceptably high" and "not conducive to a diplomatic solution."

== Insurgent attacks before 12 May ==
On 1 May, the Taliban attacked Balkh Province's Zari District overnight, killing 13 members of the Afghan security forces and injuring 17 others. On 2 May, a motorcycle bomb exploded outside the provincial prison in Mihtarlam, Laghman Province, killing three civilians and injuring four members of the security forces. Noor Mohammad, director of Laghman's provincial prison directorate, was among the injured.

On 3 May, seven Afghan security forces were killed and at least 12 others wounded in a suicide truck bomb attack on a military and intelligence base in Grishk District, Helmand Province. A Mazda mini truck was exploded in front of the gate by the suicide attacker, partially damaging the base. The Taliban claimed responsibility for the attack. In a separate attack on 3 May, the Taliban threw a hand grenade into a mosque in Khairkot District, Paktika Province, injuring 20 worshippers who were offering the night prayer after having broken their Ramadan fast.

On 4 May, four employees of the state-owned power company, Da Afghanistan Breshna Sherkat (DABS), were wounded in a bomb explosion in northern Kabul when they were returning to Kabul after repairing a transmission tower destroyed by gunmen earlier. Two of the four were in critical condition. On the same day, a policewoman was killed in the center of Kandahar, making her the fifth policewoman to be killed during the previous two months in Kandahar. No group claimed responsibility for killing her. On 7 May, a roadside bombing in Nadir Shah Kot District, Khost Province killed Gen. Sayed Ahmad Babazai, the Police Chief of Khost Province, his secretary, and a bodyguard, and also wounded another person. The Taliban claimed responsibility for the attack.

Just before the two 12 May attacks, there was a devastating attack in the night of 10 May, during which the Taliban attacked a convoy and security post in Alishing District, Laghman Province, northeast of Kabul. 27 Afghan soldiers were killed and several military vehicles were destroyed, while nine soldiers remained missing after the attack.

== 12 May attacks ==
At 10 AM on 12 May 2020, three gunmen wearing police uniforms carried out a mass shooting in the maternity ward of Atatürk Children's Hospital in Kabul. The hospital is located in the predominately Shi'ite Hazara neighborhood of Dashte Barchi and was assisted by Médecins Sans Frontières (Doctors Without Borders) personnel. The attackers killed 24 people and injured another 16. The deaths included two small children, (Note: The children were aged 7 to 8.) a midwife, and 16 mothers, who were either pregnant, giving birth, or were with their newborns. Three of the mothers were shot and killed in the delivery room along with their unborn babies. A witness later said that the killers "deliberately, and methodically, killed mothers and pregnant women, in their beds, one after the other."

The gunmen had walked straight past other wards closer to the hospital's entrance, and attacked only the maternity ward. More than 80 women, infants, and staff, including three foreign nationals, were safely evacuated from the hospital, and all of the attackers were killed by the Afghan security forces and their mentoring Norwegian special forces.

According to Frederic Bonnot, Médecins Sans Frontières' head of programs in Afghanistan: "I went back the day after the attack and what I saw in the maternity (ward) demonstrates it was a systematic shooting of the mothers. They went through the rooms in the maternity (ward), shooting women in their beds. It was methodical. Walls sprayed with bullets, blood on the floors in the rooms, vehicles burnt out and windows shot through." Bonnot added: "It’s shocking. We know this area has suffered attacks in the past, but no one could believe they would attack a maternity. They came to kill the mothers."

About an hour after the Kabul attack, a suicide bombing took place in Kuz Kunar District (also known as Khewa District), Nangarhar Province at the funeral of Shaikh Akram, a former commander of the district's police force, who had died of a heart attack a day earlier. The blast killed 32 people and injured 133 others, some severely. Abdullah Malikzai, a member of Nangarhar's provincial council, was killed in the attack, while his father, Malik Qais Noor Agha, a lawmaker, was wounded.

=== Responsibility for the 12 May attacks ===
The Afghan government blamed the Taliban for the attacks on 12 May, and immediately ordered the military to resume its offensives against the Taliban and other insurgent groups. Amrullah Saleh, then Vice President of Afghanistan, spoke of evidence that the Taliban plotted the attacks and that the Taliban were in "celebratory mood" after the attacks. Saleh added: "They double celebrate the naivete of some for accepting their lies and accusing the fictional IS-K." The acting interior minister, Masoud Andarabi, said: “This indicates close cooperation between the Haqqani network and the Daesh group [ISIL], and also the attack is a war crime. This shows that the Taliban do not have any commitment to the agreement they signed.”

The Taliban, however, denied responsibility for the 12 May attacks. Suhail Shaheen, spokesman of the Taliban office in Qatar, claimed: "These are extreme barbaric acts and only ISIS terrorists could show such brutality. Unfortunately, such elements are working under the cover of Afghan intelligence agencies and are carrying out false flag operations. The sole aim of such attacks is to destroy the peace agreement that was signed in Doha on February 29, 2020."

Islamic State of Iraq and the Levant – Khorasan Province (ISIL–KP) claimed responsibility for the Kuz Kunar funeral bombing in a statement on the Telegram messaging app. However, no armed group claimed responsibility for the Kabul hospital shooting.

On 15 May, the United States said that it had assessed that ISIL–KP was responsible for the 12 May attacks, rather than the Taliban. However, Afghan officials rejected this assertion, and reiterated that the Taliban and the affiliated Haqqani network were behind the attacks.

The Taliban, however, claimed responsibility for more than a dozen other deadly attacks in Afghanistan in May 2020.

=== Reaction to the 12 May attacks ===
The Taliban denied responsibility for the 12 May attacks and called them "heinous". Suhail Shaheen, spokesman of the Taliban office in Qatar, claimed: "The Taliban could not even think of attacking a maternity hospital and funeral prayers."

Interior ministry spokesman Tariq Aryan described the Kabul hospital attack as an "act against humanity and a war crime."

The United Nations Secretary General, António Guterres, strongly condemned the 12 May attacks. While the 15-member Security Council issued a statement reaffirming "that terrorism in all its forms and manifestations constitutes one of the most serious threats to international peace and security." The council also emphasized that the "heinous and cowardly terrorist attacks" took place during Ramadan and that ISIL–KP had claimed responsibility for the blast in Nangarhar.

The chief of the World Health Organization, Tedros Adhanom, said he was "shocked and appalled" by the Kabul attack and said that hospitals "should never be a target."

Deborah Lyons, head of the United Nations Assistance Mission in Afghanistan, denounced the hospital attack, saying: “Who attacks newborn babies and new mothers? Who does this? The most innocent of innocents, a baby! Why?”

United States Secretary of State Mike Pompeo condemned the "horrific terrorist attacks" and said that “any attack on innocents is unforgivable, but to attack infants and women in labor in the sanctuary of a hospital is an act of sheer evil.”

UK Foreign Secretary Dominic Raab said on Twitter that he was "horrified by the appalling terrorist attacks in Afghanistan today - including on a maternity hospital. Targeting mothers, their newborns and medical staff is despicable."

The External Affairs Ministry of India released a statement condemning the 12 May attacks and calling them "barbaric". It added that "Such reprehensible attacks, including on mothers, newly born children, nurses and mourning families are appalling and constitute crimes against humanity." and urged for the responsible to be brought to swift justice.

Human rights group Amnesty International tweeted "The unconscionable war crimes in Afghanistan today, targeting a maternity hospital and a funeral, must awaken the world to the horrors civilians continue to face". Human Rights Watch also demanded to bring the perpetrators to justice for this "war crime".

== Insurgent attacks after 12 May until the ceasefire ==
On 14 May, the Taliban carried out a retaliation attack near a court in Gardez, Paktia Province: a suicide truck bomber tried to explode himself outside a military compound, but exploded before its destination. The attack resulted in five civilians killed and at least 29 others injured. The Taliban claimed this as a revenge attack, after President Ashraf Ghani blamed the group for the attack at the maternity hospital; the Taliban denied responsibility for the hospital attack. On the same day, the Taliban also attacked a checkpoint in Firozkoh (also known as Chaghcharan), Ghor Province, killing three soldiers and taking 11 others captive. On 16 May, in an overnight attack on a security checkpoint in Paktia Province's Ahmad Aba District, the Taliban killed eight soldiers and wounded nine others. The soldiers had been providing security for a multi-purpose dam. In addition, the Taliban also abducted 12 civilians in the province's Tsamkani District, charging them for "collaborating with the government". Also on 16 May, a roadside bomb targeting healthcare workers in Khost exploded, injuring six civilians, including the assistant to the Khost Public Health commissioner and three doctors. All the injured were carried to Khost Civil Hospital for emergency treatment.

On 17 May, the Taliban attacked a checkpoint near the Mes Aynak mine, the country's largest copper mine, in Mohammad Agha District, Logar Province, southeast of Kabul. Eight security guards were killed and five others wounded.

On 18 May, a suicide Humvee bomber affiliated with the Taliban killed nine intelligence personnel and injured 40 others at the National Directorate of Security (NDS) unit in Ghazni, Afghanistan, also damaging the nearby Islamic Cultural Centre. On the same day in Jaghatū District, Ghazni Province, insurgents killed two police officers and three civilians on a road and set their bodies on fire. Late on 18 May, a roadside IED planted by militants in Mezana District, Zabul Province killed four civilians and injured nine others.

On 19 May, the Taliban killed a policeman and a civilian and injured 18 others in a motorbike bomb in Kunduz, Afghanistan. On the same day, the Taliban attempted to capture Kunduz, attacking several government posts but were repelled by the Afghan security forces. The Taliban were forced to flee the city, leaving ten dead bodies behind. Eight Afghan soldiers and three civilians were killed and 55 others were wounded during the Taliban attack. A clinic in the nearby Chardara District of Kunduz Province, where Taliban militants were also being treated, was partially damaged in an airstrike.

Also on 19 May, gunmen opened fire in a mosque in Charikar, Parwan Province, killing 11 worshippers and injuring 16 others when they were offering the evening prayer after breaking their Ramadan fast. The Taliban denied their involvement in the attack. At the same time, gunmen also killed three brothers and injured a child in Sabari District, Khost Province when they were returning to their home from a nearby mosque. The Taliban also denied their role in this attack. Later in the day, insurgents launched attacks on checkpoints in Khwaja Bahauddin District, Takhar Province, killing nine pro-government militiamen and wounding six others. The Taliban claimed responsibility for the latter attack.

== Insurgent attacks after the ceasefire ==
After the end of the three-day Eid ceasefire announced by the Taliban, which lasted from 24 to 26 May, the Taliban attacked a checkpoint in Ghorband District (also known as Syagird District), Parwan Province late on the night of 27 May. This was the first deadly attack by the Taliban after the ceasefire. They set fire to the checkpoint, which killed five Afghan troops, and shot dead two others. One other soldier was injured in the attack and two others were held captive, while one Taliban attacker was also killed. On 28 May, the Taliban killed seven policemen in Farah in an attack on a police post during which eight Taliban militants were also killed. In the early hours of 29 May, the Taliban stormed border security forces check posts in Paktia Province's Dand Aw Patan District, which lies on the border with the Kurram District of Pakistan's Khyber Pakhtunkhwa. 14 Afghan security personnel were killed in the attack and three others were injured. Two members of the Taliban were also killed during the attack.

On 30 May, a private bus carrying 15 employees of the Khurshid TV news station was hit by a road bomb in Kabul, killing an economic reporter, Mir Wahed Shah, a technician, Shafiq Amiri, and wounding seven other people. ISIL claimed responsibility hours after the attack, describing Khurshid TV as being "loyal to the Afghan apostate government." This was the second deadly attack against the channel in less than a year. The United States, the European Union, and NATO condemned the attack.

Further attacks occurred the following month.

== See also ==
- List of terrorist incidents linked to Islamic State – Khorasan Province
- Drowning of Afghan refugees in the Hari River – by Iran's border guards on 1 May 2020
- March 2017 Kabul attack – militant attack at a Kabul hospital
- Mariupol hospital airstrike - a similar war crime in Ukraine that killed 5 and injured 16 in March 2022
- May 2017 Kabul attack – killing over 150 and injuring 413
- May 2010 Kabul bombing
