= Ahmad Aba District =

District in Paktia Province, Afghanistan

Coordinates: 33.7739°N 69.3397°E

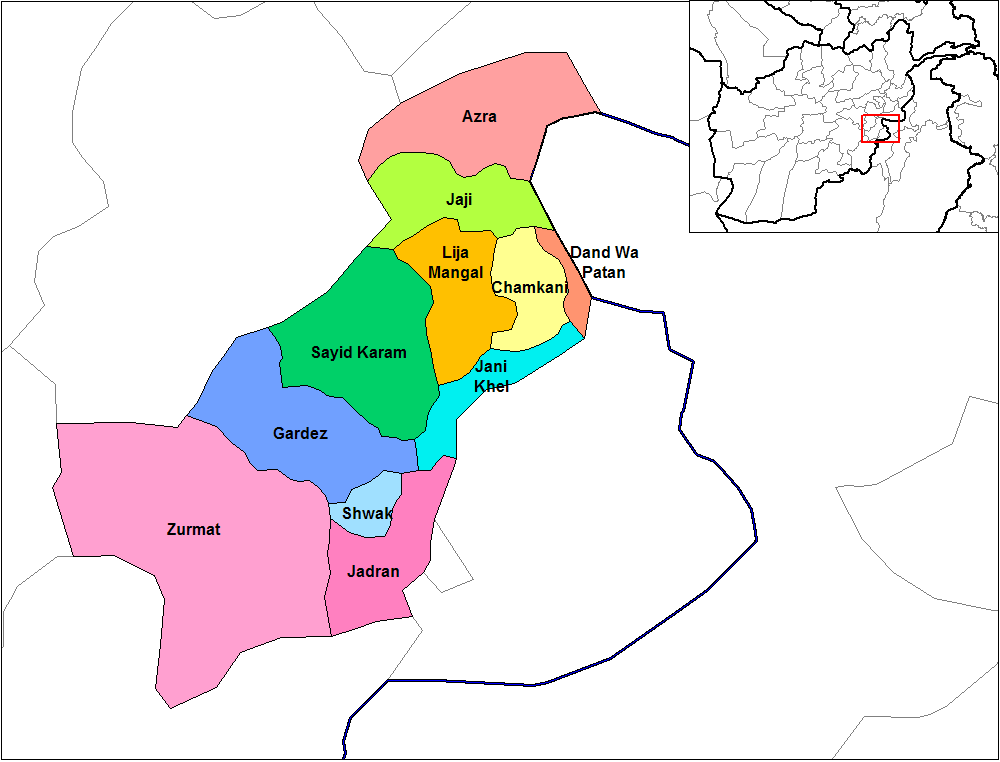
Ahmad Aba is a district in Paktia province

Ahmad Aba District (Pashto: احمد ابا ولسوالۍ), also known as Ahmadabad District, is a district in Paktia Province, Afghanistan. It is located to the east of Gardez, the provincial capital of Paktia. Ahmad Aba District was created in 2005 within Said Karam District.

== History ==
On 16 May 2020, in an overnight attack on a security checkpoint in Ahmad Aba District, the Taliban killed eight Afghan soldiers and wounded nine others. The soldiers had been providing security for a multi-purpose dam.
