= Zambar (restaurant) =

Restaurant in Gurgaon, India

Zambar is a restaurant in Gurgaon, Haryana, northern India, which serves South Indian cuisine. Zambar is situated on the third floor of Ambience Mall in Gurgaon, in a restaurant which is shaped like a long boathouse.

== Cuisine ==
Zambar restaurant serves South Indian cuisine, specifically the cuisines of Kerala, Karnataka, Andhra Pradesh and Tamil Nadu, particularly coastal dishes. The restaurant serves Chettinad, Kuttanad, Malabar, Coorgi, Mangalorean and Madras curries and vegetables. The restaurant is designed like a long boathouse. Marathwada cuisine is also served, ranging from "Bharli Wangi (peanut stuffed aubergines) to the Patal Bhaji (spinach and chana dal curry) to the Sabudana Wada and Shrikhand Poori". On Christmas Eve a special menu is served at the restaurant, with dishes such as Sutta Kozhi Biryani, which charcoal chicken biryani served with steamed coconut vegetables and gravy and Idicha Mutton Vadai, which is mutton cutlet with ghee rice and vegetables.

== Onam Festival ==
The restaurant participates in Onam, a major Kerala festival, usually held in September. To celebrate the 2019 festival in September 2019, the Head Chef Vetrimurugan Natesan cooked a feast composed of 26 elements, including pickles, chutneys, chips and finishing with desserts.

== Reception ==
GQ India cites Zambar among the best dosa restaurants in the Delhi area. Delhi Food Tours noted the "typically south Indian spices which can be traced to the open kitchen within seconds. " The Times of India said "Zambar showcases the food of the four southern states, with a preponderance of dishes from Tamil Nadu. The entire staff – kitchen and service – appears to be from the south, so authenticity is spot on. And intriguingly enough, they have three sections of the menu: vegetarian, non-vegetarian and coastal... The Vegetable Avial was the finest version I've eaten in a long time."
