= Nasher =

Nasher may refer to:

- Nasher clan, an Afghan family of the Kharoti (Ghilzai) tribe
- Nasher Museum of Art at Duke University
- Nasher Sculpture Center, a museum in Dallas, Texas
- Nasher Alagondar, a fictional character in the Neverwinter Nights video games

== People ==
- Sher Khan Nasher (1870–1935), Khan and industrialist
- Gholam Serwar Nasher (1919–1984), Khan and industrialist
- Gholam Rabani Nasher, Afghan statesman
- Farhad Darya Nasher (born 1962), singer and composer
- Jack Nasher, business psychologist
- Brian Nash (musician) (aka Nasher Nash), British musician
