= Turani =

Turani may refer to:

== People ==
- Anwar Yusuf Turani (born 1962), ethnic Uyghur nationalist
- Daniele Turani (1907–1964), member of the Italian Christian Democracy, and Italian Senator from Lombardy
- Muhammad Amin Khan Turani (died 1721), Grand Vizier of the Mughal Empire during the reign of the Mughal Emperor Muhammad Shah

== Other ==
- Toran (Pashtun tribe)
- Turani, Bosnia and Herzegovina
- Turani, Iran
- From the land of Turan

== See also ==
- Torani (disambiguation)
