= Ghilji =

Pashtun tribe

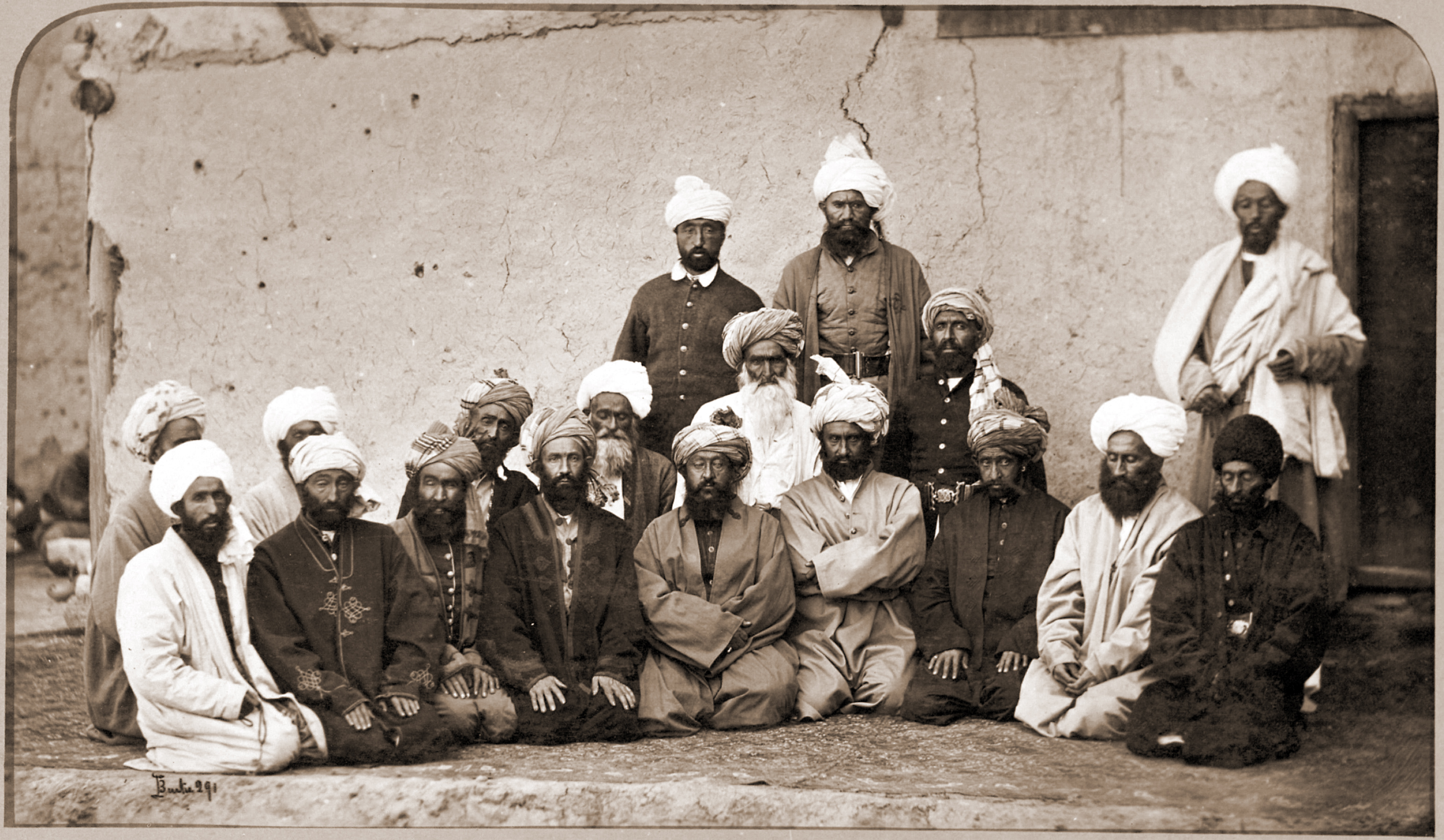
- Ghilji chieftains in Kabul (c. 1880)
- Ethnicity: Pashtuns
- Location: Afghanistan, Pakistan
- Branches: Ahmadzai, Akakhel, Andar, Hotak, Ibrahimkhel, Ibrahimzai, Kharoti, Lodi, Nasar, * Stanikzai, Sakzai, Sulaimankhel, Tarakai, Tokhi
- Language: Pashto
- Religion: Islam

The Ghiljī (Pashto: غلجي, pronounced [ɣəlˈd͡ʒi]; (Note: In Pashto, "Ghilji" (غلجي, [ɣəlˈd͡ʒi]) is the plural form of the word. Its masculine singular is "Ghiljay" (غلجی, [ɣəlˈd͡ʒay]), while its feminine singular is "Ghiljey" (غلجۍ, [ɣəlˈd͡ʒəy]).) Persian: خیلجی, romanized: Xelji), also spelled Khilji, Khalji, or Ghilzai and Ghilzay (غلزی), are one of the largest Pashtun tribes. Their traditional homeland is Ghazni and Qalati Ghilji in Afghanistan but they have also settled in other regions throughout the Afghanistan-Pakistan Pashtun belt. The modern nomadic Kochi people are predominantly made up of Ghilji tribes. The Ghilji make up around 20–25% of Afghanistan's total population.

They mostly speak the central dialect of Pashto with transitional features between the southern and northern varieties of Pashto.

== Etymology ==
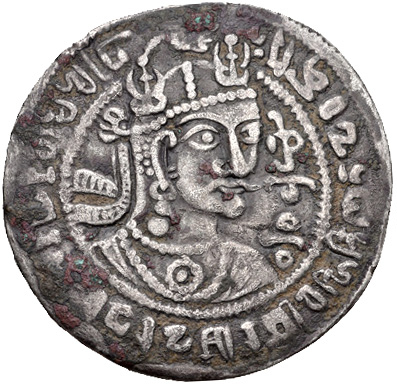
Coin of Tegin Shah, described as "Iltäbar (sub-King) of the Khalaj", dated to the year 728 CE.

According to historian C.E. Bosworth, the tribal name "Ghilji" is derived from the name of the Khalaj (خلج) tribe. According to historian V. Minorsky, the ancient Turkic form of the name was Qalaj (or Qalach), but the Turkic /q/ changed to /x/ in Arabic sources (Qalaj > Khalaj). Minorsky added: "Qalaj could have a parallel form *Ghalaj." The word finally yielded Ghəljī and Ghəlzay in Pashto.

According to a popular folk etymology, the name Ghəljī or Ghəlzay is derived from Gharzay (غرزی; ghar means "mountain" while -zay means "descendant of"), a Pashto name meaning "born of mountain" or "hill people."

== Descent and origin ==
One theory of origin states that Ghiljis are likely to be descended from the Khalaj people. According to historian C.E. Bosworth, it seems very likely that the Khalaj people of the Gazna formed the core of the Ghilji tribe, who are usually referred to as Turks. The Khalaj were sometimes mentioned alongside Pashtun tribes in the armies of several local dynasties, including the Ghaznavids (977–1186).

According to The Cambridge History of Iran volume 3, Issue 1, the Ghilji tribe of Afghanistan are the descendants of Hephthalites.

=== Mythical genealogy ===
The 17th-century Mughal courtier Nimat Allah al-Harawi, in his book Tārīkh-i Khān Jahānī wa Makhzan-i Afghānī, wrote a mythical genealogy according to which the Ghilji descended from Shah Hussain Ghori and his first wife Bībī Matō, who was a daughter of Pashtun Sufi saint Bēṭ Nīkə (progenitor of the Bettani tribal confederacy), son of Qais Abdur Rashid (progenitor of all Pashtuns). Shah Hussain Ghori was described in the book as a patriarch from Ghor who was related to the Shansabani family, which later founded the Ghurid dynasty. He fled Ghor when al-Hajjaj ibn Yusuf (Umayyad governor of Iraq, 694–714) dispatched an army to attack Ghor and entered into the service of Bēṭ Nīkə, who made him an adopted son. The book further stated that Shah Hussain Ghori fell in love with the saint's daughter Bībī Matō, fathering a son with her out of wedlock. The child was named by the saint as ghal-zōy‌ (غل‌زوی), Pashto for "thief's son," from whom the Ghilzai derived their name. The 1595 Mughal account Ain-i-Akbari, written by Abu'l-Fazl ibn Mubarak, also gave a similar account about Ghiljis' origin. However, it named the patriarch from Ghor as "Mast Ali Ghori" (which, according to Nimat Allah al-Harawi, was the pseudonym of Shah Hussain Ghori), and asserted that the Pashtuns called him "Mati". After the illicit intercourse with one of the daughters of Bēṭ Nīkə, "when the results of this clandestine intimacy were about to become manifest, he preserved her reputation by marriage. Three sons were born to him, vis., Ghilzai (progenitor of the Ghilji tribe), Lōdī (progenitor of the Lodi tribe), and Sarwānī (progenitor of the Sarwani tribe)."

== History ==
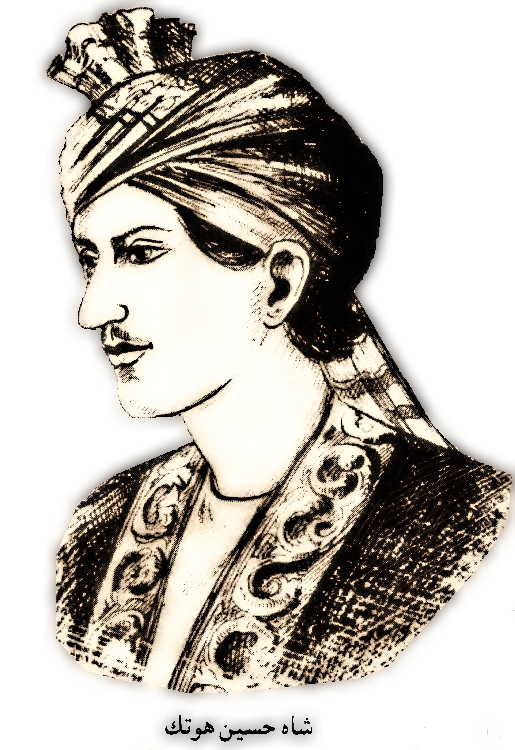
Shah Hussain Hotak (1725–1738), the last ruler of the Hotak dynasty

=== The Khalaj in medieval Islamic period ===
Medieval Muslim scholars, including 9th-10th century geographers Ibn Khordadbeh and Istakhri, narrated that the Khalaj were one of the earliest tribes to have crossed the Amu Darya from Central Asia and settled in parts of present-day Afghanistan, especially in the Ghazni, Qalati Ghilji (also known as Qalati Khalji), and Zabulistan regions. Mid-10th-century book Hudud al-'Alam described the Khalaj as sheep-grazing nomads in Ghazni and the surrounding districts, who had a habit of wandering through seasonal pastures.

11th-century book Tarikh Yamini, written by al-Utbi, stated that when the Ghaznavid Emir Sabuktigin defeated the Hindu Shahi ruler Jayapala in 988, the Pashtuns (Afghans) and Khalaj between Laghman and Peshawar, the territory he conquered, surrendered and agreed to serve him. Al-Utbi further stated that Pashtun and Khalaj tribesmen were recruited in significant numbers by the Ghaznavid Sultan Mahmud of Ghazni (999–1030) to take part in his military conquests, including his expedition to Tokharistan. The Khalaj later revolted against Mahmud's son Sultan Mas'ud I of Ghazni (1030–1040), who sent a punitive expedition to obtain their submission. During the time of the Mongol invasion of Khwarezmia, many Khalajs and Turkomans gathered in Peshawar and joined the army of Saif al-Din Ighraq, who was likely a Khalaj himself. This army defeated the petty king of Ghazni, Radhi al-Mulk. The last Khwarazmian ruler, Jalal al-Din Mangburni, was forced by the Mongols to flee towards the Hindu Kush. Ighraq's army, as well as many other Khalaj and other tribesmen, joined the Khwarazmian force of Jalal al-Din and inflicted a crushing defeat on the Mongols at the 1221 Battle of Parwan. However, after the victory, the Khalajs, Turkomans, and Ghoris in the army quarreled with the Khwarazmians over the booty, and finally left, soon after which Jalal al-Din was defeated by Genghis Khan at the Battle of the Indus and forced to flee to India. Ighraq returned to Peshawar, but later Mongol detachments defeated the 20,000–30,000 strong Khalaj, Turkmen, and Ghori tribesmen who had abandoned Jalal al-Din. Some of these tribesmen escaped to Multan and were recruited into the army of the Delhi Sultanate. 13th-century Tarikh-i Jahangushay, written by historian Ata-Malik Juvayni, narrated that a levy comprising the "Khalaj of Ghazni" and the "Afghan" (Pashtuns) were mobilized by the Mongols to take part in a punitive expedition sent to Merv in present-day Turkmenistan.

==== Transformation of the Khalaj ====
Just before the Mongol invasion, Najib Bakran's geography Jahān Nāma (c. 1200–1220) described the transformation that the Khalaj tribe was going through:

The Khalaj are a tribe of Turks who from the Khallukh limits migrated to Zabulistan. Among the districts of Ghazni there is a steppe where they reside. Then, on account of the heat of the air, their complexion has changed and tended towards blackness; the tongue too has undergone alterations and become a different language.

— Najib Bakran, Jahān Nāma

=== Khalji Dynasty ===
The Khalji or Khilji (Note: In medieval Persian manuscripts, the word can be read as either "Khalji" or "Khilji" because of the omission of short vowel signs in orthography, but "Khalji" is the correct name.) dynasty ruled the Delhi sultanate, covering large parts of the Indian subcontinent for nearly three decades between 1290 and 1320. Founded by Jalal ud din Firuz Khalji as the second dynasty to rule the Delhi Sultanate of India, and successfully fending off the repeated Mongol invasions of India.

=== Timurid raids ===
One year after the 1506 Battle of Qalati Ghilji, the Timurid ruler Babur marched out of Kabul with the intention to crush Ghilji Pashtuns. On the way, the Timurid army overran Mohmand Pashtuns in Sardeh Band, and then attacked and killed Ghilji Pashtuns in the mountains of Khwaja Ismail, setting up "a pillar of Afghan heads," as Babur wrote in his Baburnama. Many sheep were also captured during the attack. After a hunt on the plains of Katawaz the next day, where deer and wild asses were plentiful, Babur marched off to Kabul.

=== Hotak dynasty ===
In April 1709, Mirwais Hotak, who was a member of the Hotak tribe of Ghiljis, led a successful revolution against the Safavids and founded the Hotak dynasty based in Kandahar, declaring southern Afghanistan independent of Safavid rule. His son Mahmud Hotak conquered Iran in 1722, and the Iranian city of Isfahan remained the dynasty's capital for six years. The dynasty ended in 1738 when its last ruler, Hussain Hotak, was defeated by Nader Shah Afshar at the Battle of Kandahar.

=== Azad Khan Afghan ===
Azad Khan Afghan, who played a prominent role in the power struggle in western Iran after the death of Nader Shah Afshar in 1747, belonged to the Andar tribe of Ghiljis. Through a series of alliance with local Kurdish and Turkish chieftains, and a policy of compromise with the Georgian ruler Erekle II—whose daughter he married—Azad rose to power between 1752 and 1757, controlling part of the Azerbaijan region up to Urmia city, northwestern and northern Persia, and parts of southwestern Turkmenistan and eastern Kurdistan.

=== Skirmishes with British forces ===
During the First Anglo-Afghan War (1839–1842), Ghilji tribesmen played an important role in the Afghan victory against the British East India Company. On 6 January 1842, as the British Indian garrison retreated from Kabul, consisting of about 16,000 soldiers, supporting personnel, and women, a Ghilji force attacked them through the winter snows of the Hindu Kush and systematically killed them day by day. On 12 January, as the British regiment reached a hillock near Gandamak, their last survivors—about 45 British soldiers and 20 officers—were killed or held captive by the Ghilji force, leaving only one British survivor, surgeon William Brydon, to reach Jalalabad at the end of the retreat on 13 January. This battle became a resonant event in Ghiljis' oral history and tradition, which narrates that Brydon was intentionally let to escape so that he could tell his people about the bravery of the tribesmen.

=== Barakzai period ===
The Ghilji rebelled against Afghanistan's ruler in 1886, after which a large number of them were forced to migrate to northern Afghanistan by Barakzai Emir Abdur Rahman Khan.

Among those who were exiled was Sher Khan Nashir, chief of the Kharoti Ghilji tribe, who would become the governor of Qataghan-Badakhshan Province in the 1930s. Launching an industrialization and economic development campaign, he founded the Spinzar Cotton Company and helped making Kunduz one of the wealthiest Afghan cities. Sher Khan also implemented Qezel Qala harbour on the Panj River at the border with Tajikistan, which was later named Sher Khan Bandar in his honour.

=== Contemporary period ===
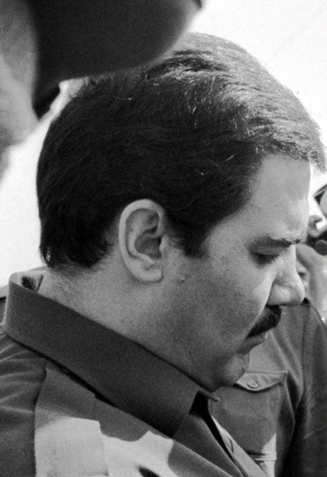
Mohammad Najibullah, of the Ghilji tribe, was President of Afghanistan from 1987 to 1992

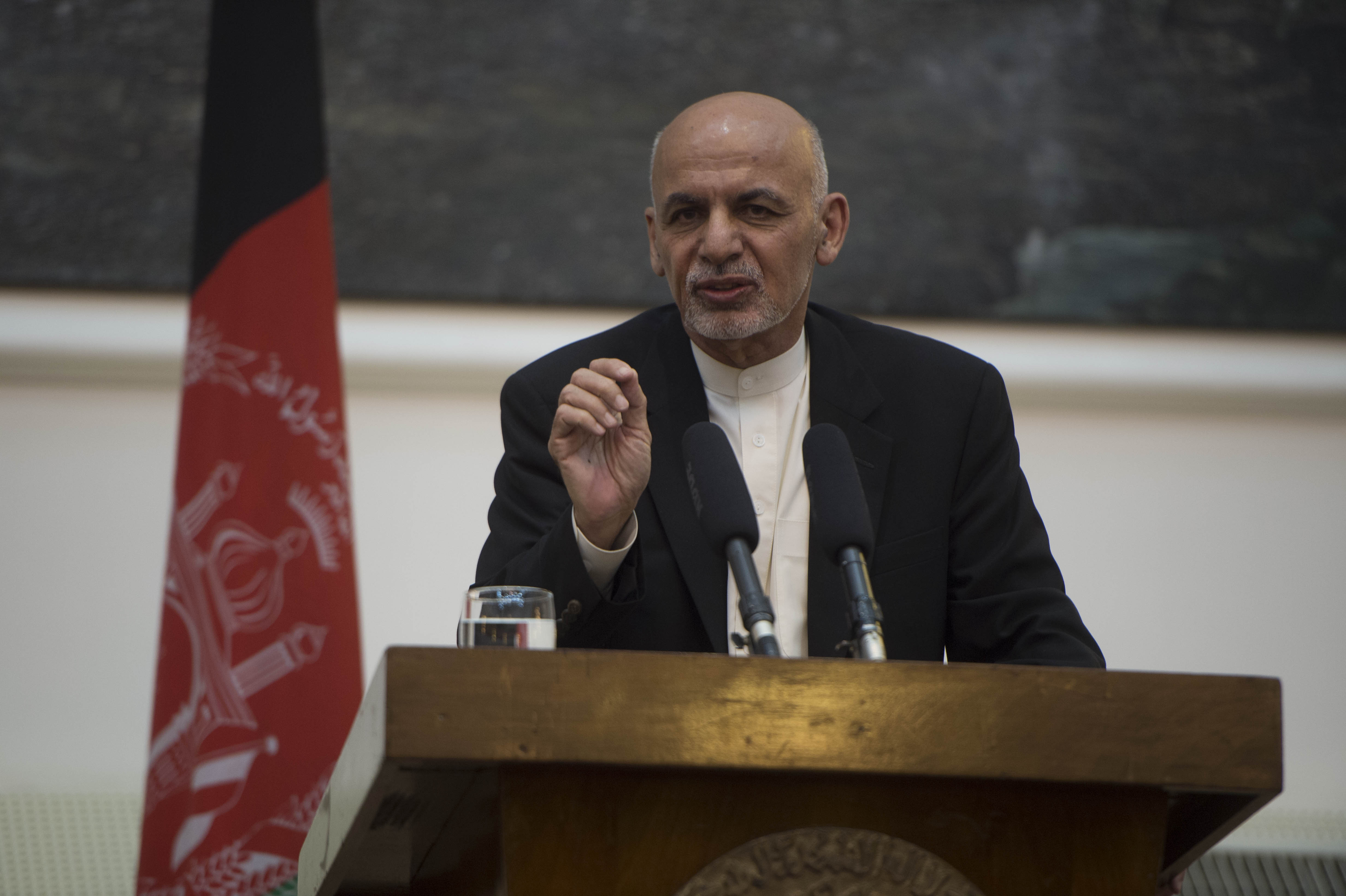
Ashraf Ghani, of the Ghilji tribe, was President of Afghanistan from 2014 to 2021

More recently, the former Presidents of Afghanistan Ashraf Ghani Ahmadzai (2014–2021) and Mohammad Najibullah Ahmadzai (1987–1992) belonged to the Ahmadzai branch of the Ghilji tribe.

Two other former Presidents of Afghanistan, Nur Muhammad Taraki (1978–1979) and Hafizullah Amin (1979), belonged to the Tarakai and Kharoti branches of the Ghilji tribe, respectively.

== Areas of settlement ==
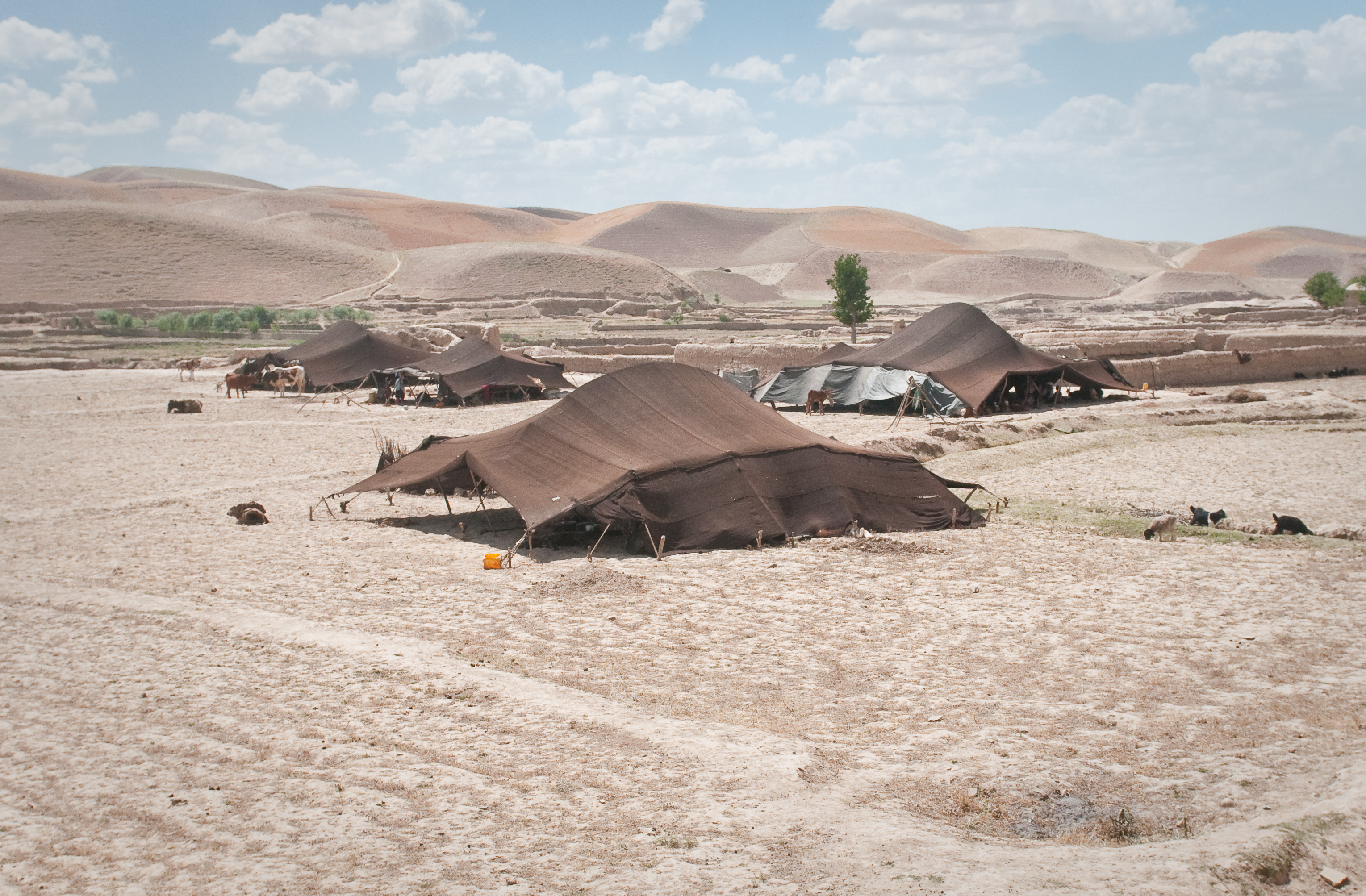
Tents of Afghan nomads in Badghis Province who are known in Pashto as Kōchyān

In Afghanistan, the Ghilji are primarily concentrated in an area which is bordered in the southeast by the Durand Line, in the northwest by a line stretching from Kandahar via Ghazni to Kabul, and in the northeast by Jalalabad. Large numbers were forced to migrate to northern Afghanistan after the rebellion of 1886.

Before the 1947 partition of India, some Ghilji used to seasonally winter as nomadic merchants in India, buying goods there, and transporting them by camel caravan in summer for sale or barter in Afghanistan.

== Pashto dialect ==
The Ghilji of the central region speak Central Pashto, a dialect with unique phonetic features, transitional between the southern and the northern dialects of Pashto.

Dialects	ښ	ږ
Central (Ghazni)	[ç]	[ʝ]
Southern (Kandahar)	[ʂ]	[ʐ]
Northern (Kabul)	[x]	[ɡ]

== Subtribes ==
- Ahmadzai
  - Jabbarkhel
- Akakhel
- Alikhel
- Andar
- Hotak
- Hussainkhel
- Ibrahimkhel
- Ibrahimzai
- Kharoti
  - Nasher
- Lodi
  - Kundi
    - Kharotakhel
  - Lohani
  - Sarwani
  - Shirani
    - Harifal
    - Miani
      - Mian Khel
  - Sur
  - Daulat Khel
  - Dotani
  - Khaisor
  - Tattor
- Nasar
- Paiyenda Khel
- Sulaimankhel
- Tarakai
- Tarakhel
- Tokhi
- Turan
- Gharzai
- Gharchai

== See also ==
- Durrani
- Yusufzai
- Kakar
