= Salaam Afghanistan =

Salaam Afghanistan may refer to:

- Salaam Afghanistan (TV show)
- Salaam Afghanistan (album)
