= Andar District =

Andar اندړ ولسوالۍ
- District
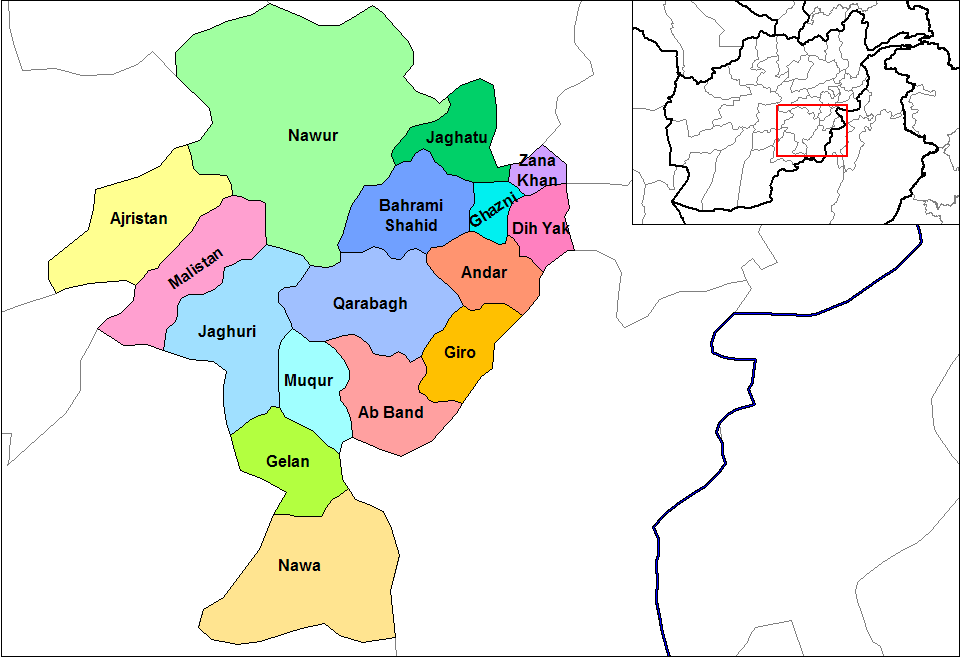

- Location within Afghanistan
- Coordinates: 33°19′21″N 68°26′33″E
- Country: Afghanistan
- Province: Ghazni
- Capital: Miray
- Elevation: 2,100 m (6,900 ft)

Population (2009)
  - Total: 88,300

Andar (Pashto: اندړ ولسوالۍ) is one of the eastern districts of Ghazni Province in Afghanistan. The population has been estimated at 88,300. The district center is Miray while the other main town is Andar. The district is named after the Andar Ghilji tribe of the Pashtuns. The district also contains the town of Sardeh Band on its edge near the border with Paktika Province.

The main source of income in the district is agriculture, which has been seriously affected by drought. Most roads are bad and unpaved. The main highway between Ghazni city and Paktika province is paved, though damaged from attacks. There is 1 clinic, 1 hospital, 17 primary schools and 1 high school.

The district contains a large water reservoir, created by the Sardeh Band Dam located near the border of Andar and Paktika.

The district has been controlled by the Taliban since October 2018.

== Notable people ==
- Azad Khan Afghan, Afghan conqueror in western Iran
- Abdul Ahad Mohmand, Afghan astronaut
- Gholam Mohammad Niazi, Afghan Islamic political thinker
