= Sardeh Band Airport =

Sardeh Band Airport د سردې بند هوايي ډګر
- IATA: SBF; ICAO: OADS

Summary
- Serves: Sardeh Band
- Location: Sardeh Band, Andar District, Ghazni Province, Afghanistan
- Elevation AMSL: 6,971 ft / 2,125 m
- Coordinates: 33°19′15.6″N 68°38′11.3″E

Map
- Location of airport in Afghanistan

Runways
| Direction | Length | | Surface |
| Direction | ft | m | Surface |
|---|---|---|---|
| 02/20 | 6,902 | 2,104 | Gravel |
- Sources: Landings.com

Sardeh Band Airport (Pashto: د سردې بند هوايي ډګر; IATA: SBF, ICAO: OADS) is an airport located in the town of Sardeh Band, and about 1 kilometre (1 mi) north of the Russian-built dam called Sardeh Band Dam (built in 1967) on the eastern edge of Andar District, Ghazni Province, Afghanistan. The airfield lies in a valley 2 miles (3 km) northwest of lake Mota Khan, near the border with Paktika Province.

Though the airstrip is still evident against the surrounding desert, it has not been maintained since Russian military Forces withdrew from Afghanistan and there are no structures to support it. During the U.S. invasion of Afghanistan, the airstrip was used in a limited capacity by U.S. Special Operations Forces.

== Facilities ==
The airport resides at an elevation of 6,971 feet (2,125 m) above mean sea level. It has one runway designated 02/20 with a gravel surface measuring 6,902 by 190 feet (2,104 m × 58 m).

== Incidents ==
On 12 June 2002 a Lockheed MC-130H Hercules was participating in a night exfiltration mission to remove U.S. Army Special Forces troops from the area when it tried to take off from the airstrip. The plane impacted the ground and crashed in a barren area, 2.5 nautical miles (4.6 km) from the airstrip.

== See also ==
- List of airports in Afghanistan
