= Andar, Ghazni =

Andar اندر
- Location in Afghanistan
- Coordinates: 33°07′32″N 67°58′58″E
- Country: Afghanistan
- Province: Ghazni
- District: Andar
- Time zone: UTC+4:30

Andaṛ (Pashto: اندړ) is a town in the Andar District of Ghazni Province, Afghanistan. It is named after the Andar Ghilji tribe of the Pashtuns.

== Notable people ==
- Azad Khan Afghan
- Abdul Ahad Mohmand

== See also ==
- Ghazni Province
