= Qahar Asi =

Afghan poet

Qahar Asi قهار عاصی
- قهار عاصی
- Born: Abdul Qahar Asi عبدالقهار عاصی; September 26, 1956; Panjshir, Afghanistan
- Died: September 28, 1994 (aged 38); Kabul, Afghanistan
- Resting place: Shuhadaye Salihin graveyard, Kabul
- Education: Agriculture Faculty
- Occupations: Poet and Agriculturist
- Spouse: Mitra Ershadi Assi
- Children: Mahasti
- Writing career
- Language: Dari Persian

Abdul Qahar Asi (Dari: قهار عاصی; September 26, 1956 – September 28, 1994) was a poet and agriculturist from Afghanistan.

He was born in Malima in Panjshir province to a Persian-speaking Tajik family. He is considered to be Afghanistan's most famous modern poet who has practiced both "New" and "Classic" poetry styles. Like many other Afghan poets and writers of his time, Asi showed his concerns about the political and social situation of Afghanistan. His poetry is, sometimes, strongly influenced by the then socio-political developments in Afghanistan. His explicit expression of the situations caused him personal problems with the then regimes in Kabul. In his book Az Jazeera-y e Khoon (Persian: از جزیره خون, lit. 'from the Blood Island'), Asi expressed his concerns about the situation of his country during the rule of the Mujaheedin and the civil war.

He was married to Mitra Ershad and had an only daughter named Mahasti.

Asi published a poetry book each year and wrote many poems with romantic and emotional contents. He also worked with Afghan singer Farhad Darya. Asi was killed by a rocket in “Bagh-e-Baka” in Kabul during the Afghan Civil War.

== Bibliography ==
- Lala-yee baraye Malima
- Maqama-ye Gol e Sori
- Diwan-e Asheqana-ye Bagh
- Ghazal-e Man wa Gham-e Man
- Tanha Wali Hamisha
- Az Jazeera-ye Khoon
- Az Atash az Abrisham
