= Salaam Afghanistan (TV show) =

Salaam Afghanistan was a one-hour TV show broadcast weekly via Satellite DGT Didar Global Television. It was produced and hosted by Ms. H. Sahar. The show aired live internationally at 8:00 pm Los Angeles, California, USA time.

The show was one of the first Afghan TV shows after the fall of the Taliban.

Sahar interviewed many famous Afghan artists including Mithaq Kazimi, Farhad Darya, Qader Eshpari and many poets.
