= Salaam Afghanistan (album) =

Studio album by Farhad Darya
- Released: December 2003
- Recorded: 2003
- Studio: Ariana Music Studio, Virginia
- Genre: Folk-pop
- Length: 50:44
- Producer: TriVision Studios

Farhad Darya chronology
| Qabila-e-Ashiq (2000) | Salaam Afghanistan (2003) | HA! (2007) |

Salaam Afghanistan (Dari: سلام افغانستان; Pashto: سلام افغانستان; transl. Hello Afghanistan) is a 2003 studio album by Afghan musician Farhad Darya, his first album since his return to Afghanistan. It was released concurrently with a DVD video album recorded in Afghanistan.

== Overview and composition ==
Farhad Darya was one of the first exiled musical artists to return to Afghanistan following the fall of the Taliban regime, when music was banned. The new album Salaam Afghanistan was his first record out of exile since 1989's Mehrabaani. At the time of his return he was considered to be the "country's biggest pop star."

The album contains a mix of Darya's own compositions and those from traditional folklore. It includes six new songs along with three older tracks: "Yakdaana Gul" (from Shakar, 1997), "Babulaal" (from In Foreign Land, 1999), and "Sheen Raket". Darya felt music was part of the country's unity and this is demonstrated in the album's songs; he has said regarding the album: "We have many different peoples but we don't have a nation. But 10 different people who won't talk to each other will all listen to one of my songs."

== Music videos ==
Music videos were produced for eight songs, all shot in Afghanistan, and released on DVD. They were directed by Mirwais Rekab.

== Reception ==
Salaam Afghanistan was widely acclaimed within Afghanistan and among the diaspora. The album reportedly sold 5,000 copies in a single day at a Kabul shop. The title track "Salaam Afghanistan" was for seven weeks top of the charts on Arman FM, the country's main music radio station.

Amid the situation in Afghanistan with the large International Security Assistance Force presence, and not long after the Taliban regime, Salaam Afghanistan and its popularity was thus covered by Western media. (Note: As seen by The Independent and Billboard) Darya's highly popular concert at Kabul's stadium in May 2004, with 40,000 in attendance, was also covered.

The Canada-based website AfghanSite.com gave the album 5 out of 10, with criticism given to the appearance of three older songs that were recycled in Salaam Afghanistan.

== Track listing ==
| No. | Title | Lyrics | Language | Length |
|---|---|---|---|---|
| 1. | "Salaam Afghanistan" | Yama Nasher Yaknamesh | Dari | 4:21 |
| 2. | "Gul Sanam" | Folklore | Pashto | 4:13 |
| 3. | "Sheeshta Baashom" | Qahar Asi | Dari | 3:49 |
| 4. | "Beeyaa Taa" | Rumi | Dari | 3:27 |
| 5. | "Pag Beerar" | Safdar Tawakoli, Abdul Samay Hamed | Dari | 4:03 |
| 6. | "Yakdaana Gul" | Folklore | Uzbek | 5:21 |
| 7. | "Babulaal" | Folklore | Pashto | 5:22 |
| 8. | "Maadaram" | Farhad Darya | Dari | 5:05 |
| 9. | "Sheen Raket" | Folklore | Pashto | 4:31 |
| 10. | "Sheeshta Baashom (Instrumental)" | - | - | 5:11 |
| Total length: | | | | 50:44 |

== Personnel ==
- Farhad Darya - vocals
- Wali Ashparie - recording and mastering
