= Toran (Pashtun tribe) =

Toran (Pashto: توران) is one of the two main branches of the Ghilji Pashtun tribal confederation. The other branch is the Ibrahimzai.
