= Nasher (Kharoti clan) =

Afghan noble family

House of Nashir
- Parent house: Kharoti
- Country: Afghanistan
- Founded: 977 / 1709
- Titles: Khan; Khanum

The Nashir (or Nasher) (Pashto: الناشر) are a noble Afghan family and Khans of the Pashtun Kharoti (Ghilji) tribe. The family is originally from Qarabagh, Ghazni but founded modern day Kunduz in the early 20th century and lived there until the end of the Barakzai dynasty in the late 20th century.

== Origins and history ==
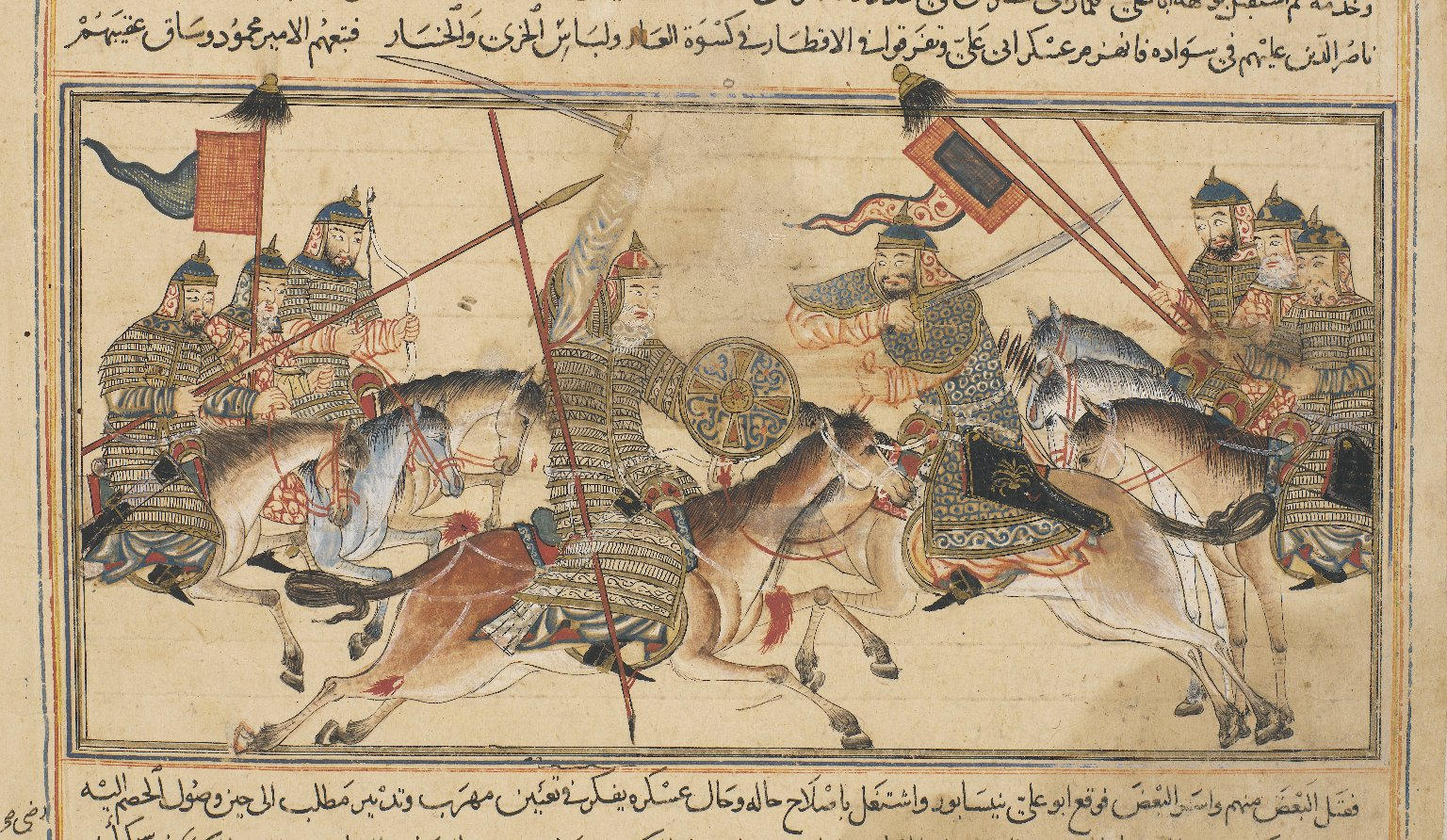
Fighting between Mahmud of Ghazni and Abu 'Ali Simjuri

Nasher are referred to in 1120 A.H (1709 A.D.), when Ghilji Pashtun tribesmen under Khan Nasher successfully overthrew Safavid rule to establish the Ghilji Hotaki dynasty, which controlled Afghanistan from 1719 to 1729 A.D. and much of Persia from 1722-1729 until Nadir Shah of Persia seized power in the Battle of Damghan.

The Nasher lived as Khans of the Kharoti (Pashto: خروټی), a Pashtun tribe of Ghilji origin with an estimated population of about 5.5 million, making it one of the largest, if not the largest tribe in Afghanistan, with significant territory throughout eastern and south-eastern Afghanistan: Ghazni, Zabul, Paktia, Khost, Logar, Wardak, Kabul and Nangarhar.

== In the 19th century ==
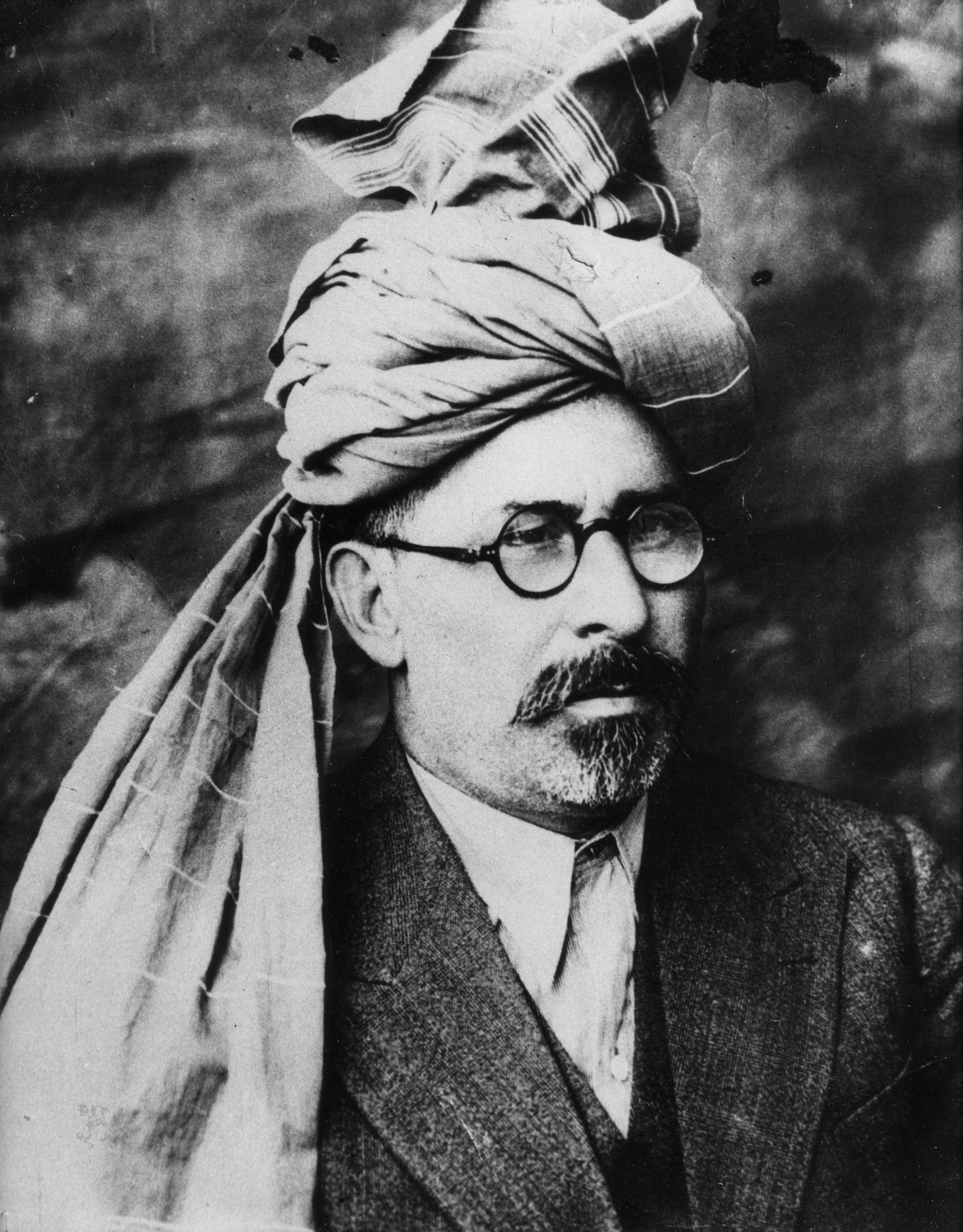
Sher Khan Nashir, Loe Khan, ca. 1910

After the great Ghilji rebellion in 1885–1886, led by Alam Khan Nasher, the Nasher family was exiled by the ruling Barakzai King Amir Abdur Rahman Khan in order to weaken his nemesis. Sher Khan Nasher, Khan of the Kharoti soon became governor of the Kunduz district launched an industrialisation campaign, founding the Spinzar Company, with major urban development and construction programmes. Economic development transformed Kunduz into a thriving city with new residential housing, schools, and hospitals for the factory workers. Sher Khan Nasher also implemented Qizel Qala harbour that was later named Sher Khan Bandar in his honour. As his power grew and he eventually controlled the whole north of Afghanistan, the throne was within his reach, which is why there are theories that he was poisoned by the Barakzai king.

== In modern history ==
Sher Khan's nephew and stepson Ghulam Sarwar Nashir developed Spinzar further, employing over 20,000 people and maintaining construction companies, a porcelain factory and hotels in Kunduz and throughout Afghanistan. Long before he became a radical, Nashir sent fellow Kharoti Hekmatyar to Kabul's Mahtab Qala military academy in 1968, as he considered him to be a promising young man. After he was expelled from the Mahtab Qala, Nasher imprisoned him briefly for toying with Communist ideology,

Der Spiegel reported in 2011 that the chief of the Kunduz district was Nizamuddin Nasher, considered to be the "last scion of a legendary Afghan dynasty" still living in Kunduz.

== Notable people ==
- Sher Khan Nashir, founder of Spinzar Cotton Company and founding father of Kunduz
- Gholam Serwar Nashir (1922–1984), president of Spinzar Cotton Company
- Gholam Rabani Nasher (1940–), member of the Loya Jirga
- Farhad Darya (1962–), singer and composer

== Cities and places named after the Nasher ==
- Sher Khan Bandar, largest port of Afghanistan
- Nashir Museum, Kunduz
