= Torani (disambiguation) =

Torani may refer to

- Torani a brand of Italian style syrups and flavor bases
- Torani Canal, the Torani Canal in northeastern Guyana
- Torani, Bihar - a village in India

== See also ==
- Turani (disambiguation)
