= Ibrahimzai =

Ghilzai Pashtun tribe

Ibrahimzai (Pashto: ابراهيمزی), also called Burhan, Boran or Brahim, are a sub-tribe of the Ghilji (غلجي) confederation, one of the major Pashtun tribal groups. Predominantly found in Afghanistan and Pakistan, the Ibrahimzai have a rich and complex history marked by their cultural heritage, social structures, and significant roles in regional politics.

== Origins and Ancestry ==
The Ibrahimzai trace their lineage back to a common ancestor named Ibrahim, a notable figure within the tribe. They belong to the Ghilji confederation, which claims descent from Shah Hussain Ghilji. The Ghilji are one of the largest Pashtun tribal confederations, alongside the Durrani, with another significant branch being the Toran.
