= Asad Badie =

- Born: Afghanistan ,Herat
- Genres: Pop
- Occupations: Singer, physician
- Years active: 1980–present
- Label: Various

Asad Badie (Persian: أسد بديع) is a singer from Afghanistan of pop music. He is one of the 1980s era singers that emerged as Afghan music was reaching the zenith of its international popularity. As a member of Goroh-e-Baran (Rain Band/ Best Friends), that included Farhad Darya, Mokhtar Majid, Wahid Saberi and others, he became immensely popular not only for his voice, but also for his looks. Badie continues to produce music from his homes in Switzerland and Austria, and often performs in charity concerts.

Dr. Badie is also a psychiatrist, having completed his medical degree in Geneva, Switzerland.

== The Look ==
In the early 1980s, when he and others started the Rain Band, he was under the constant spotlight of public attention, although Farhad Darya went on to become the more popular singer after the group members emigrated from Afghanistan in 90's.

== Recent Involvements ==
Badie performs in concerts in various cities of Europe. In the last two decades since he separated from his Rain Band colleagues, he has been the least active in singing. Due to the demands of medical school and subsequent demands of the medical profession, he has limited his involvement in entertainment, prompting his fans to become inquisitive of his status.
