= Ibrahimkhel =

Pashtun tribe

ابراهيمخيل

Languages
- Pashto

Religion
- Islam

Ibrahimkhail, Ibrahimkhel or Ibrahimkhil (Pashto:ابراهيمخيل) is a major Pashtun tribe within Afghanistan.

== Distribution ==
They live in places such as Kabul, Kandahar, Paktia, Paktika, Laghman, Jowzjan, Qunduz, Mazar-i-Sharif, Herat, Peshawar, Quetta, Upper Dir Lower Dir, Bajour and some other parts of Pakistan, as well as in a small village of Swat named Odigram near Mingora.

== Origin ==
All the historical references show that the Ibrahimkhel are the descendants of the Ghiljis.

== See also ==
- Ghilji
