= Miray =

Miray میرَی
- Location in Afghanistan
- Coordinates: 33°19′21″N 68°26′33″E
- Country: Afghanistan
- Province: Ghazni
- District: Andar
- Elevation: 2,069 m (6,788 ft)
- Time zone: UTC+4:30

Miray (Pashto: میرَی) is the district center of Andar District, Ghazni Province, Afghanistan. It is located at 33.3225°N 68.4425°E at 2,069 m altitude.

Miray has one high school, Sultan Shahabudden Ghori, and one small hospital there, and a bazaar.

== See also ==
- Ghazni Province
