= Sarda Dam =

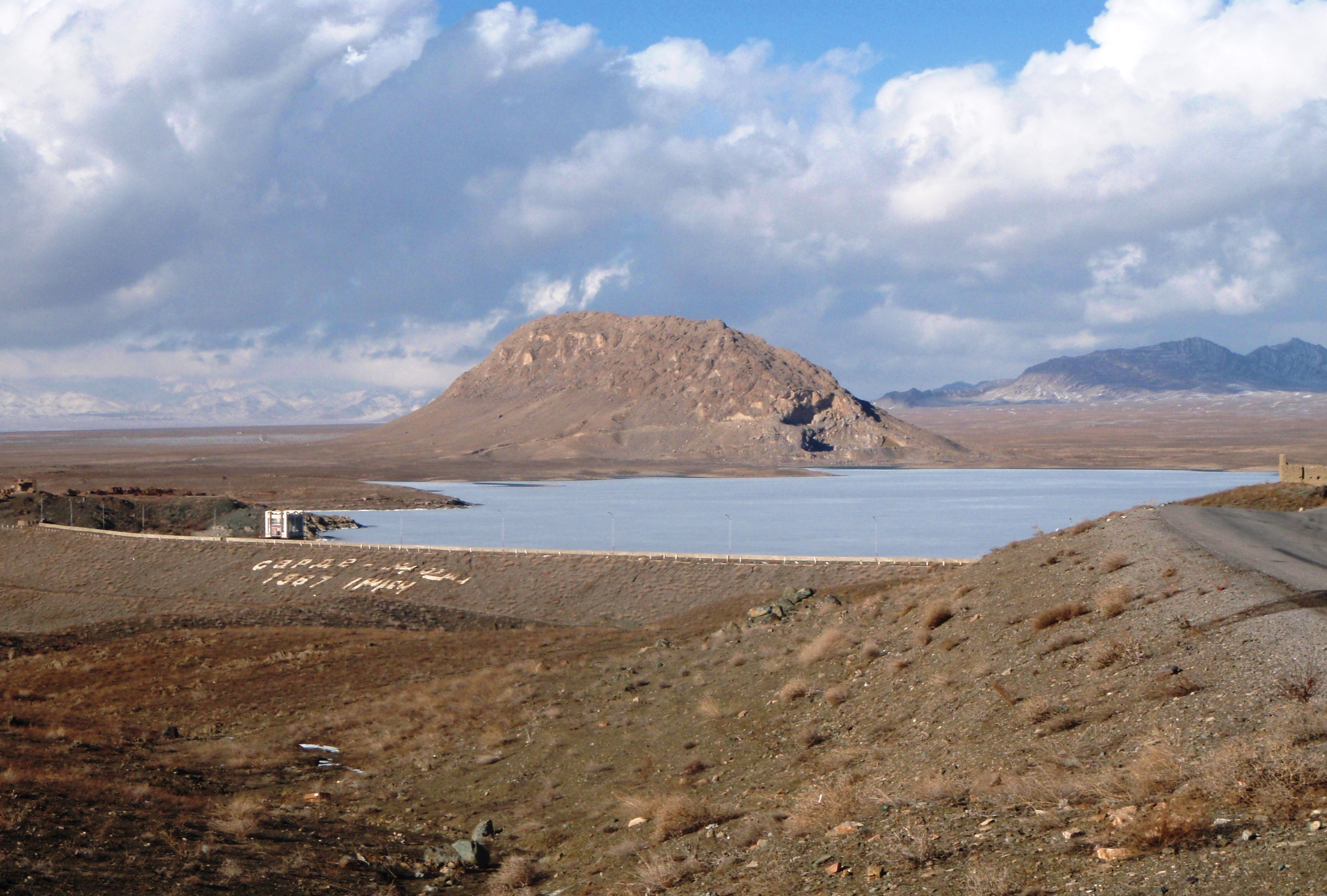
- The Sarda Dam in 2012

- Location within Afghanistan
- Country: Afghanistan
- Location: Andar District, Ghazni Province
- Coordinates: 33°17′39″N 68°38′1″E
- Purpose: Irrigation
- Status: Operational
- Opening date: 1967
- Owner: Ministry of Energy and Water

Dam and spillways
- Type of dam: Embankment
- Impounds: Gardez River

Reservoir
- Total capacity: 259,000,000 m^{3} (209,975 acre⋅ft)

Power Station
- Turbines: none

The Sarda Dam (Pashto: د سردې بند), also known as Band-e Sarda (Dari: بند سرده), is located near the town of Sardeh Band, in the eastern part of Andar District of Ghazni Province of Afghanistan. It is about 22 km (14 mi) to the northwest of Sharan, which is the capital and largest city of Paktika Province. Part of its reservoir, which provides fresh water to much of southern Ghazni, is in neighboring Paktika. In recent years, the locals proposed to turn the area into a national park, similar to that of the Band-e Amir National Park in Bamyan Province.

The Sarda Dam was constructed in 1967 (1346 in the Islamic calendar) by engineers from the then-Soviet Union, during the reign of Mohammad Zahir Shah. The maximum capacity of its reservoir is around 260 million cubic meters of water. It provided water for irrigation purposes to more than 67,000 jeribs of agricultural land. The reservoir is fed by the Jilga River which flows north–south from Paktia and Paktika provinces. The river is also labeled as the Gardez River north of the dam and the Sarda River south of the dam (by the National Atlas of the Democratic Republic of Afghanistan, page 13-14).

The dam system contains an earth dam, intake, spillway, one main canal (which is divides into two branches (the 21.5-kilometer Right Canal with 6 sub-canals and the 30-kilometres Left Canal with 16 sub-canals) and administration buildings.

== Context ==
The Sarda Dam is an indication of the presence of Soviet aid in Afghanistan prior to the Soviet invasion and subsequent occupation from 1979 to 1989. According to C.J. Chivers of the New York Times: "Moscow built schools, roads, airports and dams, and sponsored ministries, too. Soviet officials recruited students and bureaucrats for all manner of training, and invited the country's elite and its officer-, civil-service and intellectual classes to long periods of study in the Soviet Union. Education, development and modernization—like this dam, which still influences both flood control and irrigation downstream—played no small part in the Kremlin’s Afghan policy, which ultimately failed."

The Sarda Dam was built during the same period as the High Dam in Aswan, Egypt, indicating a larger Soviet strategy for the development of third world nations it sought to bring under its sphere of influence. Large lettered Russian writing is still present on the down-stream face of the dam (visible from over 500 meters away) commemorating its completion in Russian and Pashto script. On the left it reads: "сарде 1967" and on the right: دسرده بند۱۳۴۶

== Rehabilitation ==
According to USAID's Ghazni Infrastructure Needs Assessment: September 14–18, 2003, local officials agreed that the top priority for irrigation infrastructure rehabilitation in Ghazni province is the Sarda Dam. They were disappointed in the progress of the donor community on the dam. They reported that 14 NGOs, both national and international, have been asked to conduct assessments on the dam and surveys for funding the rehabilitation of the dam. Of these 14 NGOs, only four have conducted the assessments, and none have received funding for work to date. The NGOs who have conducted assessments on the dam are: International Engineering Consultancy Company, ACLU, LERCC and ARA (local NGO).

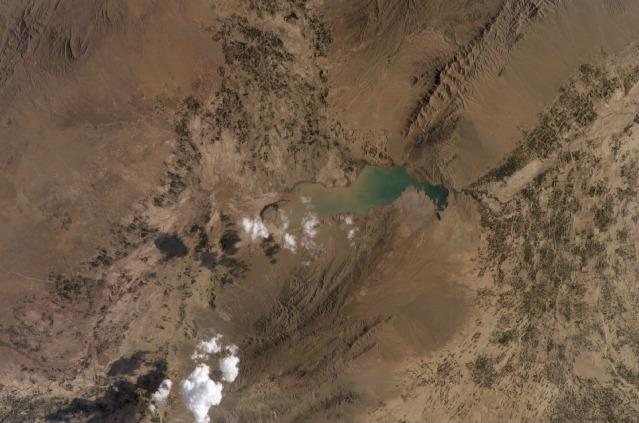
The Sarda Dam and its reservoir as seen from space

In February 2010 members of Ghazni Provincial Reconstruction Team and Central Asia Development Group met with key leaders from Andar district to enlist support for a massive irrigation project concerning the repair of the irrigation canals fed by the Sarda Dam. "The Chardewal irrigation system was built to distribute water from the Bandee Sardi Dam throughout much of Andar, but due to neglect the canals have fallen into disrepair. Currently, water flows at only 50 percent capacity, limiting the ability of local farmers of the Kahnjoor farming zone to make a living. The reconstructed canal would be a one-kilometer cobblestone irrigation channel along the village with a curb separating the roadway from the canal. Chardewal, a village located in the middle of Andar, has suffered from drought and poor water management. With mentoring from the PRT, cooperation from the district sub-governor and village elders, the CADG will rebuild the village canal. It is the first stage of a long term cash-for-work program aimed at restoring the irrigation system and rehabilitating the Kahnjoor farming zone. Capacity building in this unstable district is considered the most critical mission for the development, reconstruction and stabilization efforts being made in Andar. 'Our problems are our water (supply) and our roads,' said Niaz Mohammad, an elder from Chardewal. 'We do not have enough water, wells or roads.' The project hopes to provide cash-for-work for deprived households in a Pashtun dominated area. The project could improve the agricultural potential for more than 2,000 people."

During the 7 August 2011 plenary session of the Meshrano Jirga (MJ) Senators invited the Emergency Response Committee to hear about their preparations for emergencies. When discussing current drought conditions, Alhaj Allah Dad (Ghazni Senator) said: "The Bandi Sardi dam is full of mud. If cleared, it could irrigate thousands of acres of agricultural land."

== Military activity ==
During the 1980s Soviet–Afghan War, the Soviets built the Sardeh Band Airport and a garrison next to the Sarda Dam. They were used for training Afghan government forces, including logistics and launching places for military operations against rebel groups. The wrecked hulls of Soviet tanks, armored personnel carriers, and other heavy equipment were still present in 2012. During the recent United States war in Afghanistan, both the Afghan and U.S. forces have used the base as a gathering place for locals and elders to discuss local security. On 12 June 2002, a Lockheed MC-130H Hercules was participating in a night exfiltration mission to relocate some U.S. Army Special Forces from the area when it tried to take off from Sardeh Band Airport. The plane impacted the ground and crashed in a barren area, 2.5 nautical miles from the airstrip.

== Soviet expeditionary dam construction ==
The Soviet Union built many other dams in other countries as it sought to extend its sphere of influence. Many of these projects were undertaken by a Russian firm called Hydroproject (Russian: Институт «Гидропроект», Gidroproekt). It is unclear if Hydroproject was involved in the design or construction of Band E Sardeh Dam. Other expeditionary projects undertaken by Hydroproject include:

- Aswan High Dam in Egypt
- Jenpeg Dam, the first stage of Nelson River Hydroelectric Project in Manitoba, Canada
- Paraná Medio, Argentina (proposed)
- Sanmenxia Dam, China
- Malka Vakana Dam, Ethiopia
- Tehri dam, India
- Dukan Dam, Iraq
- Đerdap dams on the Danube, Romania-Serbia
- Mansoura Dam, Syria
- Euphrates Dam (a.k.a. Tabqa Dam), Syria
- Tishrin Dam, Syria
- Yali Falls Dam, Vietnam
- Hòa Bình Dam, Vietnam
- Sơn La Dam, Vietnam
- Limón Dam, Peru

== See also ==
- List of dams and reservoirs in Afghanistan
- Water supply in Afghanistan
