= Battle of Kirkhbulakh =

1751 battle

Date	28 July 1751
Location	Kirkhbulakh, near Yerevan (present-day Ararat province, Armenia)
Result	Georgian victory

Belligerents
Kingdom of Kakheti; Kingdom of Kartli	Army of Azad Khan

Commanders and leaders
Heraclius II	Azad Khan Afghan; Mohammad Khan †

Strength
3,000	18,000

The Battle of Kirkhbulakh (Georgian: ყირხბულახის ბრძოლა) was fought in 1751 in the village of Kirkhbulakh between the Kingdoms of Kartli and Kakheti commanded by Heraclius II against the Azad Khan Afghan's armies, ending with Azad Khan Afghan's army being defeated.

== Background ==
Azad Khan Afghan had ended up in far western Persia many hundreds of miles away from his native land during the reign of Nader Shah. Following the latter's death, he turned into a lone warlord, as well as a pretender to the Persian throne, looking forward to extend his dominion. He took advantage of the defeat of the Georgians against Haji Chalabi Khan. Putting his army under the command of his vassal Mohammad Khan, evicted from Georgia earlier, the siege of Yerevan in the Erevan Khanate was ordered. The khan of Erivan appealed to King Heraclius of Kakheti and his father King Teimuraz of Kartli, offering to become their tributary in exchange for their assistance. Heraclius quickly assembled a small army and marched to lift the siege. Upon hearing about this, Azad-Khan abandoned the siege of the city, which was already devastated. According to Papuna Orbeliani's accounts:

The city of Yerevan was desolated. There were no harvesters in the ruined city. Apart from the Erivan Fortress and Etchmiadzin Cathedral, the city was left with no standing buildings.

King Heraclius ordered his men to harvest the crops to deal with the hunger in the city and set up defensive positions at the narrow passage of the nearby village of Kirkhbulakhi (in some sources Kirbulakhi). Meanwhile, Azad-Khan had assembled his army. He attacked Heraclius's fortifications on 28 July 1751.

== Battle ==
The battle started off with Azad Khan gaining an advantage over the Georgians by pushing back their left flank. King Heraclius ordered his cavalry to dismount from their horses to allow them to maneuver in a narrow corridor and ordered his musketeers to hold their fire and wait for his command. When the Georgians were virtually encircled, Heraclius ordered an all out attack at the center of Azad Khan's army, killing Mohammad Khan instantly. The Georgians were able to exploit the confusion and break through the Khan's encirclement with a fierce counter-attack. King Heraclius ordered his men to run down the retreating army of Azad Khan, which they did for as far as 30 kilometres (19 mi), killing and capturing many on their way.

== Aftermath ==
The resonance of the decisive battle fought in Kirkhbulakh was apparent in all of the neighboring Caucasian khanates. The renegade city-states went back under the Georgian authority, while Azad-Khan opted for a "friendly relationship" with regard to his northwestern neighbor. King Heraclius could now focus on addressing his losses in his previous war with Haji Chalabi as well as preventing incursions of Dagestani tribes and putting an end to unstable inner politics. Afterwards, the Khan of Erivan was obligated to pay a yearly tribute to the Georgian kings. The Khan often tried to escape this obligation, and Heraclius campaigned against the Erivan Khanate several times to exact tribute.
