= Andar (Pashtun tribe) =

Ghilji Pashtun tribe

The Andar (Pashto: اندر) are a Ghilji Pashtun sub-tribe. The Andar occupy nearly the whole of the extensive district of Shalgar south of Ghazni.

The Andar were traditionally known for their skill in the construction and maintenance of large karez (underground irrigation systems). More concentrated in Ghazni Province, they have also a significant presence in Paktia. During the 19th century they joined in the Ghilji revolt and many were summarily sent into internal exile. Somewhat inexplicably, they allied themselves for a time with the Harakat-i Islami, during the anti-Soviet campaign. There were two Mujaheddin parties named Harakat-i Islami Afghanistan, the other and far more significant party was originally a 'united front' of mainly Hezb-i Islami and Jamiat-i Islami, that collapsed after only a few months, leaving behind a significant party that was in many ways a precursor to the present day Taliban movement. A majority of the Andar tribe were affiliated with this 'Harakt-i Islami' and it is noted that the leader of this United Front and later party, Mawlawi Mohammad Nabi Mohammadi was Andar by tribe. Similarly, the senior Mawlawi Mansoor was Andar too. Mansoor's son Saifurrahman Mansoor was later an important figure and military leader in the Taliban movement.

Andars living in the Andar District of Ghazni Province (Afghanistan) and surrounding areas consist of five main clans: Jalalzai, Musakhail, Lakankhel, Brahimzai, Bazikhel and Peerkhail. The Andar were organized by an elder referred to as Khanay Baba around early 19th century. This also coincided with the Afghan British wars and when Amir Abdul Rahman reached a compromise with the British, he further supported Andar (and other supporting Pashtoon tribes). During this era, a military commander known as Sepah Salar (highest military rank in the then army) Sher Ahmad Khan was notable for leading many years of successful conquests.

In the meantime, Andars participated in the ongoing war against the British. Famous among the Andar military leaders in the war against the British were Mullah Mushk-e Alam in Ghazni area and Haji Abdul Razaq in Waziristan. Both men are still remembered as great leaders to this day.

Traditionally, the Andar specialized in construction and maintenance of qanats. Some Andar tribesmen are living in Bahlol Khel, Badaber area of Peshawar. The hujra in Bahlol Khel is still called "Da Andaro Hujra" The history of this hujra is 600 years old. Some notable Andar are Tawas Khan who was the elder of Andar Qom in Bahlol Khel. His son Muhammad Azam Khan was his successor. Danish Khan, Mian Gul, Haji Gohar, Ali Khan, Musa Khan, Masroor Hussain Khan and etc. are the notable amongst Andar Qom of Badaber Bahlol Khel.

== Notable people ==
- Jalalzai
- Lakan Khel
- بهادر خان اندړ
- Azad Khan Afghan
- ملا مشک عالم
- جنرال محمد کریم نیازی
- Abdul Haq Wasiq

== Sources ==
- Rose, H. A. Glossary of the Tribes and Castes of the Punjab and North West Frontier Province
- Ethnic Identity in Afghanistan, Program for Culture and Conflict Studies, US Naval Postgraduate School
