= Latif Nangarhari =

Afghan singer

Latif Nangarhari (Pashto :لطیف ننګرهاری, born about 1981) is a well known Afghan singer. He sings in the Pashto language (although has one Dari song). He is an ethnic Pashtun born in Jalalabad in Nangarhar Province (a reference from his surname), and has lived in London, England since 2001.

Latif's first songs were released in 2008, with his first and so far only album, Rasha Gule, consisting of 10 songs, in 2009. He quickly became popular, especially because many of his songs are based on poetry and about peace in Afghanistan.

Latif has performed concerts throughout Australia, Europe, Russia, and the Middle East.

== Rasha Gule album ==
1. Rasha Gule Rasha
2. Che Bangro
3. Sta Judaye
4. De London Musafer
5. Kabul Jan
6. Nana Warokai
7. Afghanistan
8. Wale Maien Shaway
9. Yara Sta
10. Rasha Gule Rasha II

== Singles ==
- Afghanistan De Wranawalo Nadai
- Chashman
- Bangrrewale
- Shirin Afghanistan
- Zolfi De Maran De
- Eshara
- Sta Stergo Deewana Kerem
- Meena
- Wade Kawo
- Shar E Faryad
- Da Afghan Bacho Maktab
- Za Afghan Yem
- Da Stergi De Biya Dasi Laki Dary
- Ta raghely Pa Zuani
- Zama jan jan watana afghan watana
