= Gholam Rabani Nasher =

Afghan politician

- Known for: served on the Constitutional Loya Jirga

Gholam Rabani Nasher is a citizen of Afghanistan. Following the Bonn Conference that chose Hamid Karzai as Afghanistan's interim leader a Constitutional Loya Jirga was to write a new constitution. Nasher was one of the 502 delegates Karzai appointed. He sat on the third of the Jirga's ten committees. The Constitutional Loya Jirga sat from 2002 to 2004.

He was born in Kunduz in 1940, son of Loe Khan Nasher, grandson of Sher Khan Nasher.
