= Kharotakhel =

Subtribe of Sameen Niazis of Deli Namdar

Kharotakhel (Pashto:خروټا خېل) is a Pashtun Sub-Tribe of the Niazi Tribe. The Tribe is a further Sub-Tribe of Sameen Pathan. The Tribesmen live in Deli Namdar, Tehsil Kalurkot, Bhakkar District, in the Punjab. The Tribe has land holdings in Bhakkar District.

Khota Khel has no relationship with Khotis who are from Ghilzais.The Tribesmen live in Deli Namdar, Tehsil Kalurkot, Bhakkar District, in the Punjab. The Tribe has land holdings in Bhakkar District. They settled here after the Third Battle of Panipat (1761). They fought against the Sikhs at the 1821 siege of Mankera, with the Sadozai Nawab, of the area of Dera Ismail Khan.
