= Sardeh Band =

Sardeh Band سردې بند
- Town
- Location in Afghanistan
- Coordinates: 33°19′15.6″N 68°38′11.3″E
- Country: Afghanistan
- Province: Ghazni
- District: Andar
- Elevation: 2,125 m (6,971 ft)
- Time zone: UTC+4:30

Sardeh Band (Pashto: سردې بند) or Sardeband (Pashto: سردېبند) is a town located on the eastern edge of Andar District, Ghazni Province, Afghanistan, near the border with Paktika Province. The town is located near the Sardeh Band Dam. The Sardeh Band Airport is located in the town.

== Notable people ==
- Abdul Ahad Mohmand, Afghan astronaut

== See also ==
- Loya Paktia
