= Akakhel =

Ghilzai Pashtun tribe

The Akakhel, pronounced Akaa Khel or Akakhail (Pashto: آقاخیل), are a Pashtun sub-tribe of the Ghilji/Ghilzais confederation. Their mother language is Pashto. In the early 20th century, the tribe was generally pastoral. The Akakhel are one of the largest Ghilji Pashtun subtribes. Since the 19th century, a minority of Akakhel migrated to Khyber Pakhtunkhwa.

The population of the Akakhel is estimated to be approximately 2 million. The population of this tribe primarily lives in Afghanistan. (Note: This figure aligns with the data established in the "Distribution" section of this article. The Mindat links corroborate this Afghan-majority distribution by verifying extensive physical Akakhel settlements across multiple Afghan provinces, correcting an earlier un-cited error that confused this Ghilji sub-tribe with the separate Afridi Aka Khel of Pakistan.)

The Akakhel, along with the Sulaimankhel, are two major tribes of the Eastern Ghilji confederation.

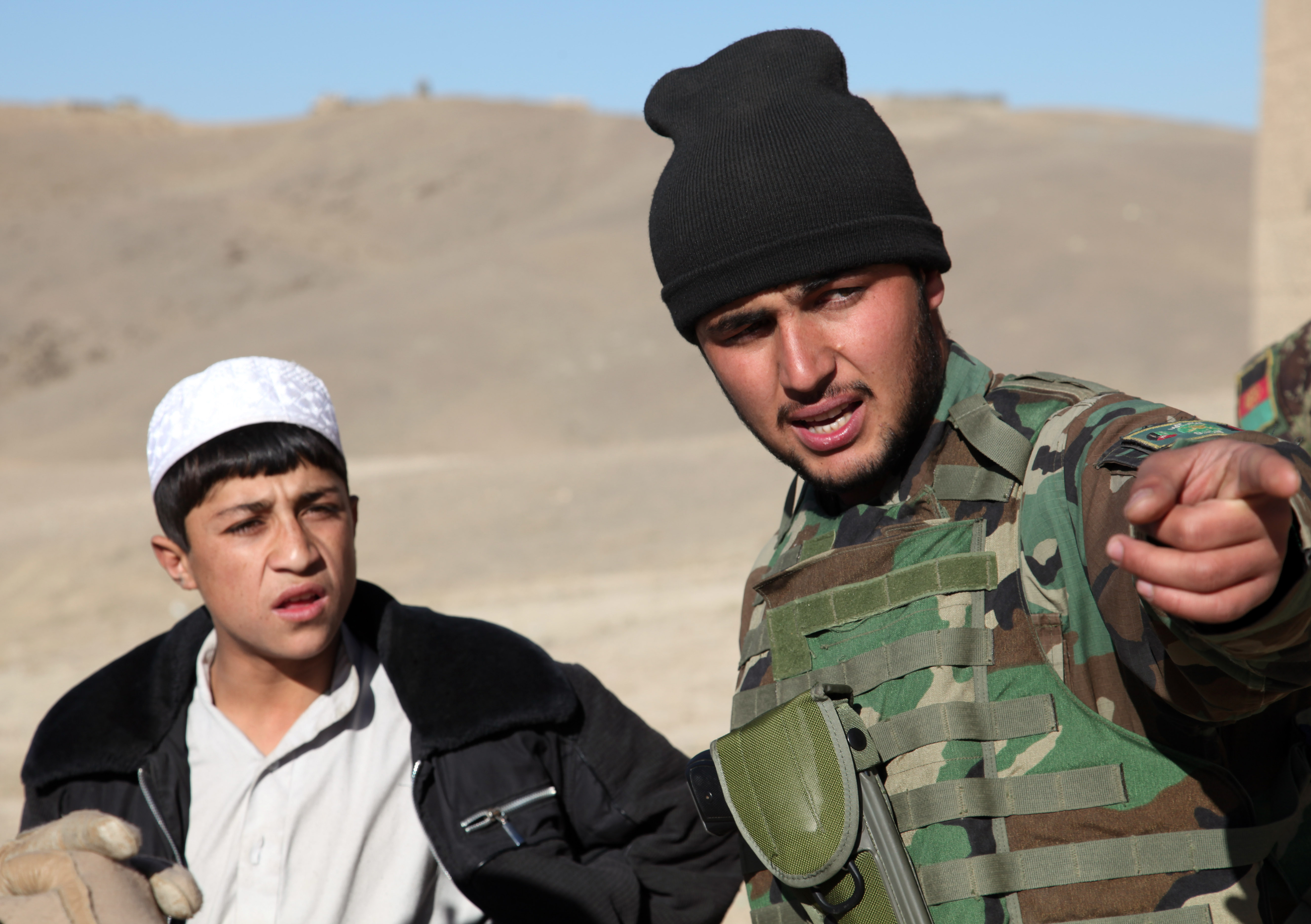
An Akakhel village youth wearing a traditional white prayer cap alongside an Afghan Soldier in Wardak Province (2010).

== Distribution ==
Tribal Research Cell of Government of Khyber Pakhtunkhwa, Pakistan, Home and Tribal Affairs Department, have provided the available old/historical record copies of the Akakhail tribe since British era i.e. 1932–34. In which it is clearly stated that:

"217. The Aka Khel are true Ghilzais and related to the Ali Khel and Sulaiman Khel with whom they are friendly. The association of Aka Khel of Katawaz and Ali Khel with the Sulaiman Khel of Katawaz is so close that, often, when asked to what tribe they belong, they say that they are Sulaiman Khel."
