= Turani, Iran =

Turani توراني
- Village
- Location within Iran
- Coordinates: 36°09′40″N 58°52′33″E
- Country: Iran
- Province: Razavi Khorasan
- County: Nishapur
- Bakhsh: Central
- Rural District: Fazl

Population (2006)
  - Total: 141
- Time zone: UTC+3:30 (IRST)
  - Summer (DST): UTC+4:30 (IRDT)

Turani (Persian: توراني, also Romanized as Tūrānī) is a village in Fazl Rural District, in the Central District of Nishapur County, Razavi Khorasan Province, Iran. At the 2006 census, its population was 141, in 43 families.
