= Gholam Serwar Nasher =

Gholam Serwar Nasher (also known as Ghulam Sarwar Nashir; 1922–1984) was the last ruling Khan of the Nashir and President of Spinzar Cotton Company in Kunduz, the most profitable company and one of the largest companies in pre-war Afghanistan.

== Life ==
Nashir was born in Qarabagh, Afghanistan to Mohammad Alam Khan Nasher, brother to Sher Khan Nasher, to an ethnic Pashtun Ghilzai family of Khans.

Nashir led the Spinzar Cotton Company in Kunduz, exporting cotton overseas, producing cotton seed oil, soap and porcelain. He built hotels under the Spinzar brand in Kunduz, Kabul and other northern cities, employing over 20,000 people including woman working in the porcelain factory. He opened factories in the north, providing free housing for the employees, hospital, the only girls school in the city of Kunduz, sport clubs, and hotels. Nashir founded the Nashir Library and Museum.

During his khanat, Kunduz become the richest province of the pre-war country, Spinzar being Afghanistan's most profitable company.

Nashir was awarded "The Order of the Golden House" by King Zahir Shah and "The Order of the Sacred Treasure" by the Emperor of Japan, in 1971.

== Death ==
He died in exile in West Germany in 1984 at the age of 62. He was survived by two wives, nine children and eight grandchildren.

=== Discovery of Ai-Khanoum ===
On a hunting trip, Nashir discovered ancient artefacts of Ai Khanom and invited Princeton-archaeologist Daniel Schlumberger with his team to examine Ai-Khanoum. It was soon found to be a major city of the Greco-Bactrian kingdom and was extensively studied before the outbreak of the Soviet-Afghan War in 1979, during which it was comprehensively looted. Artefacts from the ruins have been exhibited worldwide.
