= Miani (Pashtun tribe) =

Pashtun nomadic tribe(kochi)

Sarbani
Regions with significant populations
- Afghanistan, Pakistan

Languages
- Pashto

Religion
- Islam

Related ethnic groups
- other Pashtun tribes, other Iranian peoples

Miani (Pashto: میاني) is a pashtun tribe, who are the descendants of Saraban, the son of Qais Abdur Raseed. They reside in Afghanistan and Pakistan where they mainly inhabit the Gomal plains in the Tank District of Khyber Pakhtunkhwa, which was formerly North-West Frontier Province. A major portion of the tribe also reside in Dera Ismael Khan ( kokar, Mandhran, Pusha Pull, Baloch Wanda etc ) Panjab ( Riaz Abad, Muzaffar gharh, Jhang etc) and Balochistan ( Harnai).

== History ==
=== Gomal plains ===
The Mianis lived in the Gomal Plains of the Tank District of Khyber Pakhtunkhwa, Pakistan

Though initially a nomadic tribe, Mianis settled in the Gomal plains by or before 1850. The estimated population of the Miani tribe was about 800 in the 1870s. They were a semi-independent group that lived along the Tank border, except for the hot season, when they moved into the hills.

An important technique that the British used to manage the frontier was to make certain tribes responsible for monitoring who had passes to travel on particular routes into the hills. They called this “pass responsibility”. The Bhitannis first accepted pass responsibility on the Tank frontier. Then, pass responsibility for the Girni, Murtuza and Manjhi posts was assigned to the Miani and Ghurezai tribes in 1876. That year, they also accepted responsibility for monitoring passage into the Gomal Valley.

In 1879, when Tank was raided by Tribals and an uprising took place, wherein the tribes believed that the British control over the area is weakening, these tribals looted a number of villages around Tank. The same fact has been narrated by Evelyn Berkelen Howell, that in January 1879. To protect Tank from further plundering Miani tribe took responsibility to keep it safe from further insecurity and plundering."

=== Miani in Baluchistan ===
Though a portion of Miani Tribe live in Baluchistan especially in the Shirani District, sizable population of the Miani people live in Sharigh Tehsil of Harnai District in Balochistan Province.
