= Farhad Darya =

Afghan singer, writer, and composer (born 1962)

- فرهاد دريا
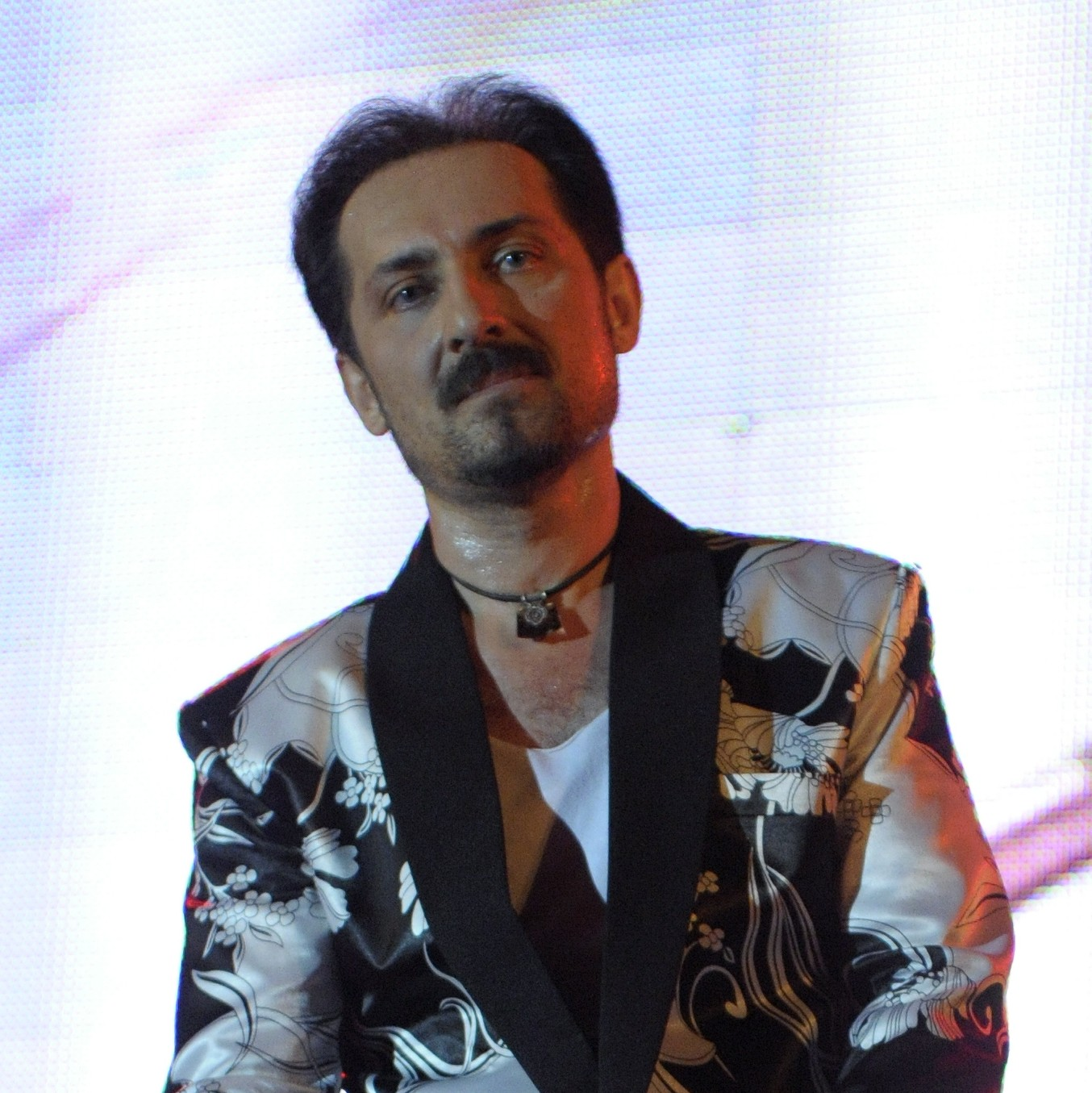
- Farhad Darya in 2010
- Born: Farhad Nashir; 22 September 1962 (age 63); Gozar Gah, Kabul, Kingdom of Afghanistan
- Occupations: singer; composer; human rights activist; peace ambassador
- Years active: 1980–present
- Height: 175 cm (5 ft 9 in)
- Spouse: Sultana Emam (m. 1993)
- Musical career
- Genres: Pop music; Dance music; ghazals; classical music; Rock music
- Instruments: Harmonium, keyboard, guitar
- Website: www.farhaddarya.info

Farhad Darya (Pashto/Dari: فرهاد دریا; born 22 September 1962) is an Afghan singer, composer, music producer, and philanthropist. Active since the 1980s, Darya has been one of the most renowned and influential Afghan pop musicians of the modern era, contributing to establishing new wave in Afghanistan and blending urban and rural styles. Darya's career has spanned multiple genres - including semi-classical ghazal, pop, folk, and rock - as well as both his native languages Dari Persian and Pashto as well as Uzbek, Hindi and English.

Outside his music career, Darya is a philanthropist and campaigner for human rights, having served as the United Nations Development Program (UNDP) National Goodwill Ambassador for Afghanistan, and is involved in numerous charitable organizations, such as Music Village and others.

== Early years and education ==
Farhad Darya was born Farhad Nashir in Kabul, Afghanistan, to the Nashir branch of the Khilji Pashtun tribe. His family originated from Kunduz Province. He is the grandson of Sher Khan Nashir.

After moving back from Kunduz to Kabul he spent his senior year at Habibia High School and later enrolled at Kabul Polytechnic University, during which time he started his band. He later transferred to Kabul University to study Persian literature. During this time, he wrote music for other artists under the pseudonym Abr (Cloud), and started playing Afghan and Indian classical music. Several times he left university to serve conscription in the Afghan Armed Forces. By 1988 he started teaching classical music at the university while also pursuing research in the field of music.

== Music career ==
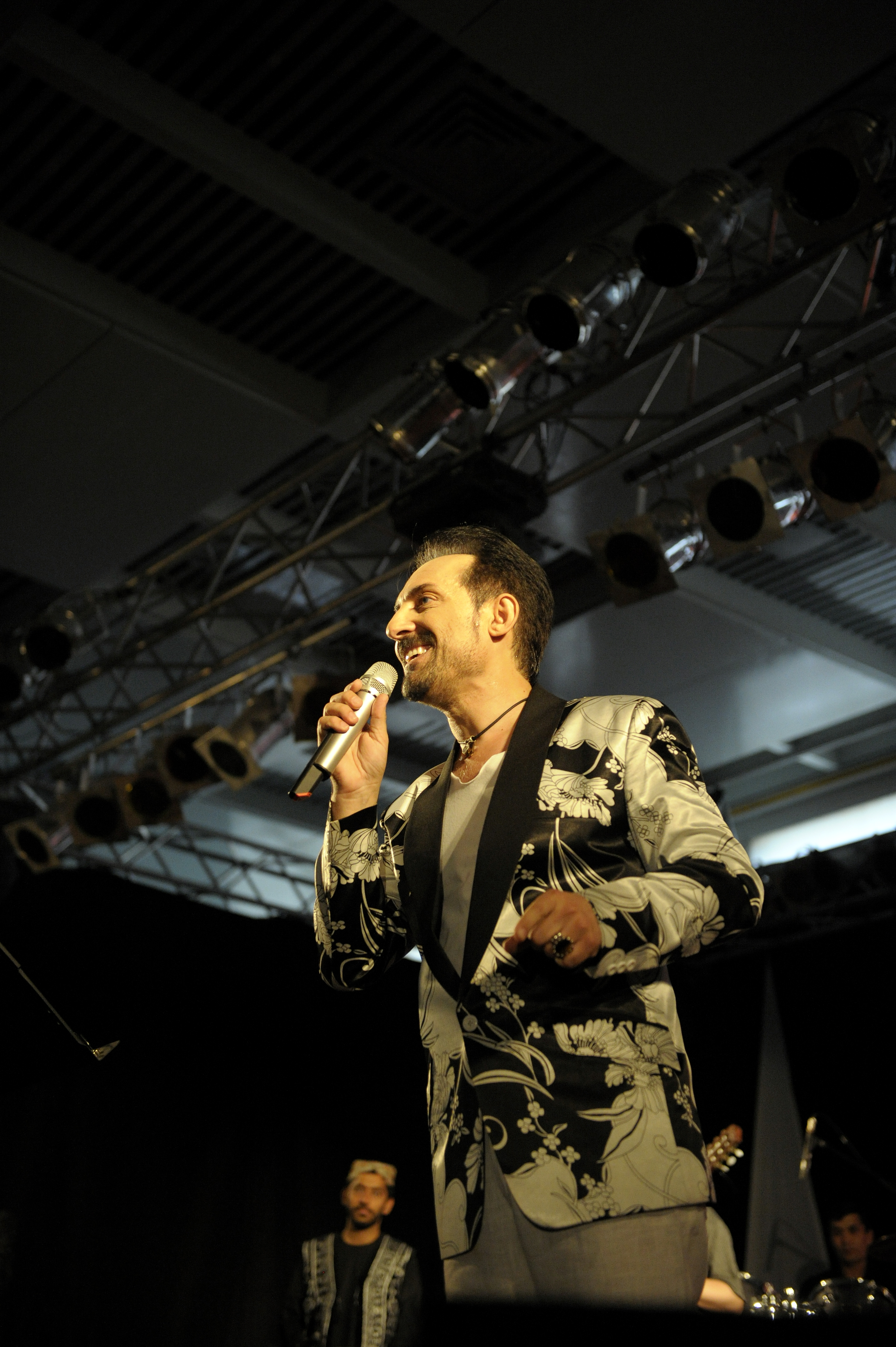
Farhad Darya at the 2010 Peace Concert in Kabul, Afghanistan.

=== Goroh-e-Baran and early solo work ===
Darya debuted on Radio Television Afghanistan (RTA) as the leader of Goroh-e-Baran (meaning "Rain Band") with Asad Badie, Wahid Saberi, Mokhtar Majid and Jawad Rahi, with a fresh genre of folk-pop. It became one of the best known bands in the 1980s, producing hit songs such as "Aay-e-Mann,” “Roz-e-Bazar,” and “Dokhtar-e-Sardaar”. After Goroh-e-Baran disbanded, he started a solo career and claims to have introduced multitrack recording in the country in 1986.

Throughout his career, Darya produced music that broke with the traditional structure of composition, orchestration, and vocal characterization. His music contains elements of Western pop with classical ones from Afghanistan and the Indian subcontinent.

Popular titles included "Freshta Jan" and "Mehrabaani". As with other artists, his songs were recorded at the Kabul RTA studios but number of his songs were recorded at Radio Prague in Czechoslovakia, including a popular song "Do Kaftar" (meaning Two Doves).

=== Albums in exile ===
In 1990, Darya left Afghanistan, travelling through Prague and Paris before settling in Hamburg, Germany. He started recording new content in Paris and Hamburg for his first album while in exile, Begum Jaan, released in 1992, featuring more experimental work. It included one hit song, "Kabul Jaan", meaning Beloved Kabul. The song was apparently played by the Mujahideen rebels after they entered Kabul and, nine years later, the first song played by Radio Afghanistan after the Taliban regime collapsed.

His next studio album in 1995, called Afghanistan, became a major hit, featuring diverse acclaimed tracks of different traditional Afghan styles. Its hit song was the track "Golom Golom". After this album, Darya and his wife Sultana moved to Virginia in the United States, where he continued his career, recording his next album Shakar released in 1997. This was another hit album and had a larger number of upbeat dance tracks.

Darya created the soundtrack of an Afghan American film In Foreign Land, recorded and released in California in 1999. It included a hit song, "Khosham Meeayad".

=== Salaam Afghanistan and later work ===
Following his return to Afghanistan after thirteen years, he worked on his next album called Salaam Afghanistan (meaning Hello Afghanistan, describing his homecoming), which became a major hit in the country and the first such hit in the post-Taliban era. Thousands of CD copies were sold of the album and especially the lead track "Salaam Afghanistan" became wildly popular. It was accompanied by a video album shot entirely in Afghanistan released in 2004.

On May 14, 2004, Darya held a large concert at Kabul's Ghazi Stadium. Up to 45,000 enthusiastic people attended the concert, far above the number of tickets provided, in the first such major event after the Taliban regime when music was banned. The concert was listed as one of 50 Great Moments in World Music by the British magazine Songlines in 2008. Darya described the event as "It was like a national independence day."

Darya then collaborated with German rock musician Peter Maffay with a new project for the benefit of children. This resulted in his first rock song - and the first Afghan mainstream rock song - named "Salamaalek", sung in both Dari and English, representing a greeting to the world that is both political and peaceful. The song appeared on Maffay's album Begegnungen – Eine Allianz für Kinder released by Sony BMG on September 29, 2006. The album peaked at number 9 in the official German charts and the song Salamaalek was also popular in Afghanistan. Darya and the ensemble of other artists in the project performed at a Ein Herz für Kinder programme broadcast on ZDF where 9 million euros were raised for helping children in need.

In August 2007, Darya completed his new album HA! and it was later released in Afghanistan and elsewhere. Different from his previous work, HA! is considered "world pop" and was made with a fusion of Eastern and Western music. It included a music video for the hit song Dohle Bezan (Nazdeek Shodan) (meaning Talk To Me/Closer) - a rock song with a fusion of Indian dhol - premiering on national television in February 2008, which called for national unity. He worked on the video for eight months and traveled to different parts of Afghanistan for it; BBC Persian described the video as "a collection of scenes and symbolic movements that show the collective desire of the Afghan people for the beginning of a peaceful and common life". Regarding the unsusual genre of rock in Afghan music, Darya said in an interview: "Rock music is protest music, and in order to be able to convey this message louder to the world, this style of music, which is almost unknown in Afghanistan, is considered the best way."

Darya's next album, Yaahoo, was released in August 2008, calling it a "peace album" and distributing the CD for free in Afghanistan. It was created as part of a program supported by the German Development Service for promoting peace through music. The album was recorded at a studio near Munich and produced by Goar B.

=== Recent work ===
In 2009 he released new songs Atan, De Kor Deewaloona, and Sarzamine Man. Darya launched the Life Is Beautiful (Pashto: Zhawand Khkolai Dai) tour in 2010 traveling to different parts of the country to perform in the name of peace. This included a women-only concert in Mazar-i-Sharif on World Peace Day with 15,000 in attendance, and even a concert in the war-torn Helmand Province in November 2010 where he safely sang to a crowd of 5,000 at the sports stadium in Lashkargah. British forces hailed the concert, which was handled by the Afghan National Police. In 2011 he released a music video of the tour's title song Zhwand Khkolai Dai (ژوند خوکلی دی), and later released Dewhaaye Mast (دیوهای مست).

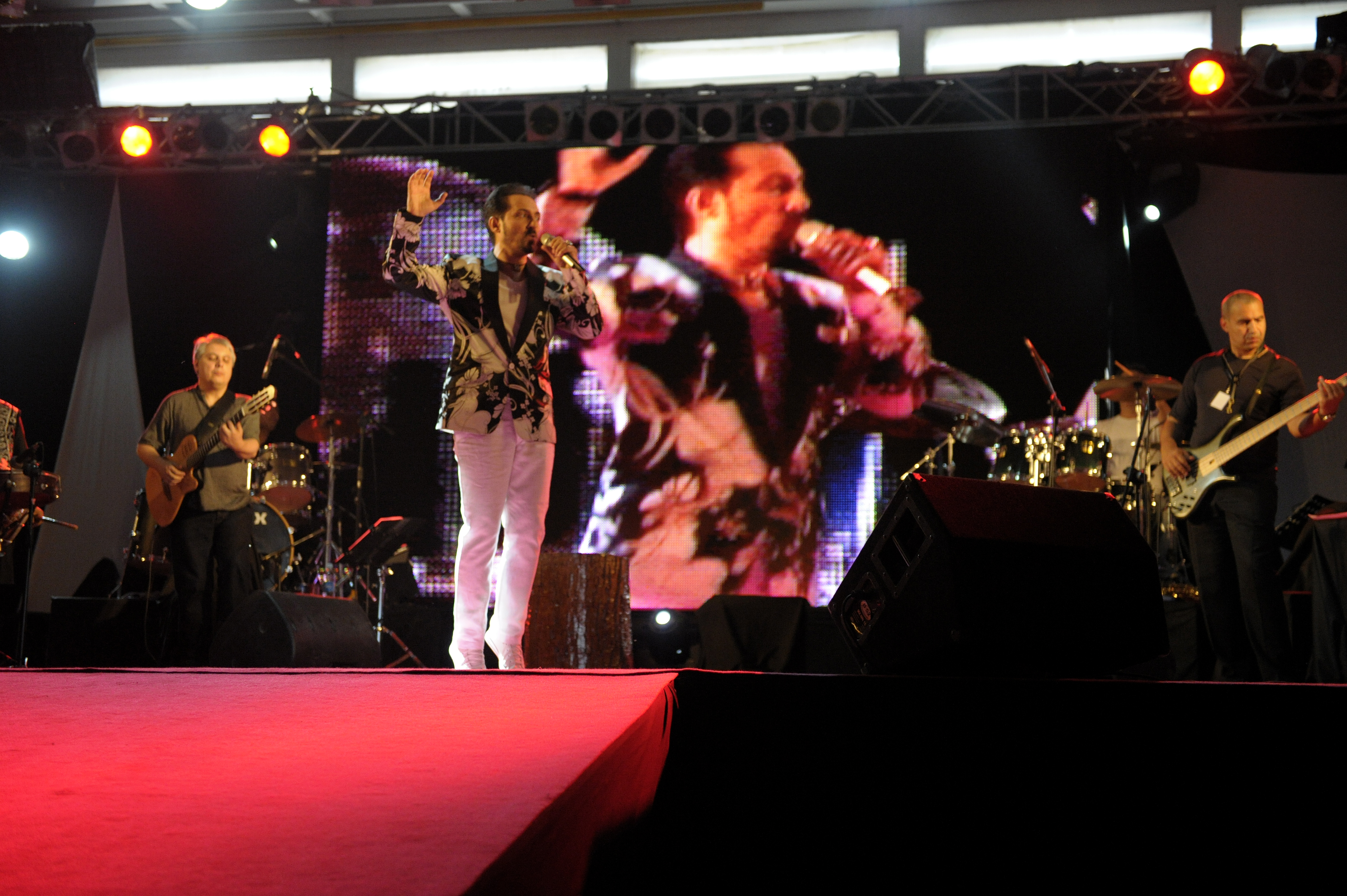
Farhad Darya's Peace Concert in Kabul, Afghanistan.

Darya performed at the 7th Annual ATN Awards held in Delhi in 2013 alongside Qais Ulfat, Valy Hedjazi, Latif Nangarhari, Jawid Sharif, Aryana Sayeed and Naghma.

Darya's song Oo Ghaita (Pashto: او غایتا, meaning "those days") was released with a music video in February 2014, with Darya being both the composer and lyricist. Rather than describing hope and future peace, the song is about nostalgia of the past, in particular pre-war Afghanistan. A well-known song, it received some criticism about the language and meaning, though Darya denied that it had to do with politics, describing it as a "personal story".

In 2019, there was a stir on Afghan social media about Darya quitting the music industry following a cryptic comment he made during a performance on Afghan Star. He clarified in an interview with SBS Dari in Australia that it was about issues he had in his life at the time and how it "transformed" him. He released new songs in 2020: "Corona" and "Dashte Noqra". In defiance to the Taliban's restrictions on music and artistry, he launched the Music Never Dies protest concert tour in 2022 and also debuted a new song, "Dar Molkake Ma".

== Philanthropy and campaigning ==
Following his return to Afghanistan in 2003, Darya started a non-profit organization to improve the welfare of children. He later launched a project for street children named Kochah. In 2006 his initiatives led to him earning considerable praise from high figures in Afghanistan, including a Human Rights Award. Darya became UNDP National Goodwill Ambassador of Afghanistan in 2008. He used music to "carry the message of peace", and said in an interview:

There is always a window from music to an individual's soul. That's why it has the strongest power, in my opinion. You don't need to use any force on people's minds to make them convinced ... it [music] goes directly to people's hearts.

He launched a blood donation campaign for the Afghan national security forces in 2014, 'Karzar Qatra Qatra ba Darya’, at Daoud Khan Military Hospital. Darya and his wife along with other artists campaigned for the #WhereIsMyName campaign to allow women to use their public names freely; it successfully led to a change in law signed by president Ashraf Ghani in 2020.

In 2020, Darya unsuccessfully wrote an open letter opposing the demolition of Kabul's historic Cinema Park, which went ahead on the order of the First VP Amrullah Saleh. In 2022, he appealed to the president of Tajikistan Emomali Rahmon to reconsider hosting homeless Afghan refugees.

Darya and 14 female painters launched a visual arts campaign in 2023 in support of women in Afghanistan.

== Recognition ==
He's a phenomenon because his songs appeal to all age groups

— Andreas Schneider, Deutscher Entwicklungsdienst director, 2008

A household name among many Afghans, Darya has been praised for promoting cultural tolerance and peace in the country. He has also received recognition in the Western media during the 2000s and 2010s amid the International Security Assistance Force presence and the War in the country. UNAMA described him as "Afghanistan's most popular singer" in 2009 and NPR "biggest musical star" the same year. Darya is also known in the other Persian speaking countries, Iran and Tajikistan, and in parts of Pakistan and Central Asia.

Some Western media had nicknamed him Afghan Elvis because of his fame; Darya himself said it was "sweet" but that it was a Western invention and not something he is called in Afghanistan. The Afghan Elvis nickname is generally given to the 1970s star Ahmad Zahir.

== Awards ==
- 1990: Afghanistan: Singer of the Year by Youth Magazine/Radio Afghanistan
- 1996: United States: Star Of The Contemporary Music Of Afghanistan by Afghan Radio (California)
- 2006: Afghanistan: Human Rights Award by Afghan Independent Human Rights Commission
- 2010: Germany: Best Male Artist of 2009, Annual ATN Awards
- 2011: Netherlands: Best Male Artist of 2010, Annual ATN Awards
- 2011: Afghanistan: Person of the Year (2010) by Radio Azadi
- 2013: India: Legend in Music by Annual ATN Awards

== Discography ==
Studio albums (Afghanistan-only releases)

Year	Title	Notes
1981	Rahe Rafta (راه رفته)	
1982	Folk Music (محلي)	
1983	Baran (باران)	With Goroh-e-Baran
1985	Ghazal (غزل)	
1986	Bolbole Awara (بلبل آواره)	
1988	Mazdeegar (مازديگر)	
1988	Bazme Ghazal (بزم غزل)	
1989	Mehrbaani (مهربانی)	

Studio albums (international releases)

Year	Title	Notes
1992	Begum Jaan (بیگم جان)	
1995	Afghanistan (افغانستان)	
1997	Shakar (شكر)	
1999	In Foreign Land (در سرزمين بيگانه)	Film soundtrack
2000	Qabila-e-Ashiq (قبیلهء عاشق)	Compilation of tracks from 1985 to 1989
2000	Golom Golom (گُلم گُلم)	Compilation of tracks from Afghanistan and Shakar
2003	Salaam Afghanistan (سلام افغانستان)	
2007	HA! (!ها )	
2008	Yaahoo (یاهو)	

Video-only releases

Year	Title	Notes
1980	Yaare Bewafaa (یار بی وفا)	
1993	Ateschparcha (آتش پرچه)	Hamburg concert
1996	Live In San Francisco (كنسرت سانفرانسيسكو)	
1999	Live In Europe	

Derivative appearances

- Begegnungen – Eine Allianz für Kinder (2006)
- Listen To The Banned (2010)
- The Rough Guide To The Music Of Afghanistan (2010)

== Filmography ==
Darya produced additional scoring and lyrics for Through Her Eyes a film by Mithaq Kazimi in 2007.

Darya produced background music for the film In Foreign Land (1998).
