= Azad Khan Afghan =

- Khan
- Azad Khan, during his time at the court of Karim Khan
- Reign: 1750-1758
- Born: Andar, Ghazni, Hotaki Empire
- Died: 1781; Shiraz, Zand Iran
- Burial: Kabul
- Issue: Mahmud Khan (son)
Names
- Azad Khan Andarh Ghilzai
- Father: Sulaiman Khan
- Religion: Sunni Islam
- Military career
- Conflicts: List of Battles: Battle of Kirkhbulakh; Persian-Afghan Wars; Battle of Deh Pari; Capture of Isfahan; Capture of Shiraz; Battle of Urmiya (1757)

Azād Khān Afghān (Pashto: آزاد خان افغان) or Azād Shāh Afghān (Pashto: آزاد شاه افغان; died 1781) was a Pashtun military commander and a major contender for supremacy in western Iran after the death of Nader Shah in 1747. Azad rose to power between 1752 and 1757 and had his power base in the Azarbaijan region, at various points in his career occupying parts of central and western Iran, as well as Kurdistan and Gilan.

== Early life career ==
Azad was born in Andarh town in the east of Ghazni, Afghanistan, into the Andarh clan of the Ghilzai Pashtun confederacy. He was the son of Sulaiman Khan. Owing to his father's name, some quarters mistake him as Sulaimankhail. He joined Nader Shah's army around 1738 and took part in his campaigns in India and Iran. At the time of Nader's murder, he was second-in-command to Amir Aslan Khan Qeroğlu Afshar, the governor of Azarbaijan.

== Rise to power ==
Azad played a prominent role in the power struggle that followed the death of Nader. He quickly defected Aslan Khan to Nader's nephew and would-be successor, Ebrahim Mirza, and earned for himself the title of khan. In 1749, Ebrahim was himself defeated by Nader's grandson, Shahrokh Shah, Azad Khan attached himself and his Afghan cavalry to Mīr Sayyed Moḥammad, the superintendent of the shrine at Mashhad, following whose orders he withdrew to the western marches of Iran. He continued to be involved in the unrest in Iran and, through a series of alliances with local Kurdish and Turkic chieftains and a policy of compromise with the Georgian ruler Erekle II, Azad rose to control all the territory between Ardabil and Urmia by 1752.

== Downfall ==
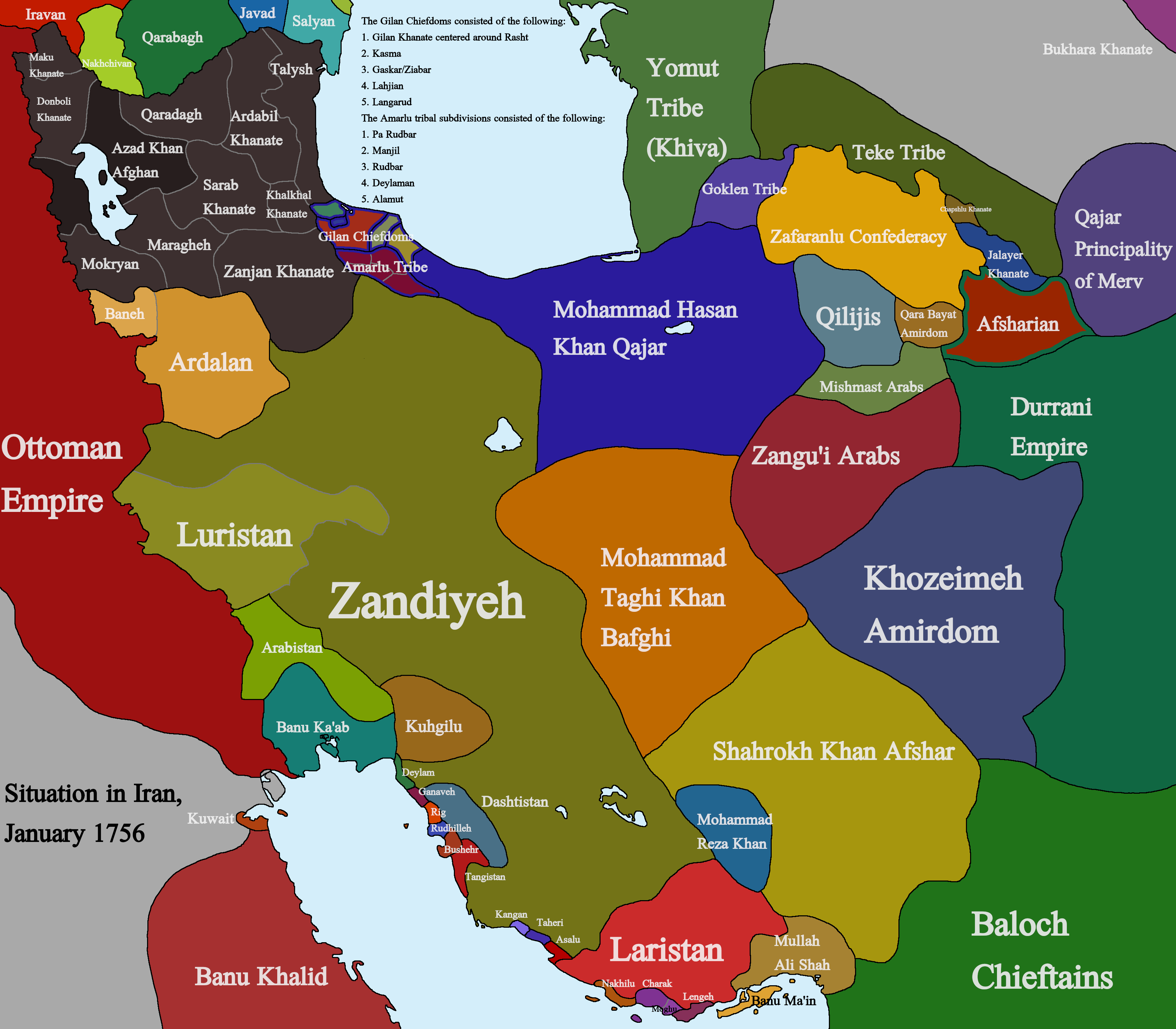
Map of Iran just after Azad Khan Afghan's repulsal from Central Iran in 1755

Azad, defeated in the battle of Kirkhbulakh, failed to gain the lands north of the Aras due to the Georgian power, but succeeded, in 1753, to annex the central Zagros provinces. He was going to unite his forces with the Bakhtiari leader Ali Mardan Khan, advancing from Baghdad against the de facto regent of western Iran, Karim Khan of the Zand clan, but the union was prevented by Karim victory over Ali-Mardan Khan. Azad Khan had to retreat, but inflicted a heavy defeat upon the pursuing Zand army and then took Karim's home fortress of Pari, near Malayer. In 1754, Azad, allied with the Afshar chief Fath-Ali Khan, attacked Karim at Qomesa and occupied Shiraz, driving him to Kazerun. The Zands eventually defeated Fath-Ali Khan and took Shiraz on 29 November 1754, marking the reversal of Azad's fortunes. By June 1757, he had lost Isfahan, Tabriz, and Urmia to the resurgent Qajars of Mazandaran under Mohammad Hasan Khan. Azad fled to Baghdad and, following a failed attempt at comeback, took refuge at the court of Erekle II in Tbilisi, Georgia, in 1760. In 1762, he surrendered himself to victorious Karim Khan, by that time the master of all of northern Iran, and ended his days as Karim's honored pensioner in Shiraz. Azad died in 1781 and, in accordance with his will, was interred in his native lands, in Kabul, many hundreds of miles to the east.

== Legacy ==
J. R. Perry explains that Azad was viewed as "brave and chivalrous". He seems to have nurtured the idea to create a neo-Safavid, or perhaps even neo-Ghilzay, Iranian empire. However, unlike his rival contenders, Azad was "an alien without any lasting source of support in western Iran—a Sunni Afghan with no urban or tribal-territorial base, and who was never able to acquire a Safavid scion to legitimize his authority". The power of the Ghilzay tribe in Afghanistan had been destroyed earlier by Nader Shah and they were in turn replaced in the 1750s by the Abdali (later known as Durrani). During Azad's exile at Baghdad, in 1758-59, most of his Ghilzay followers in Iran, consisting of both troops and non-combatant settlers, were massacred by the Qajar governor of Mazandaran and then by the Zands.
