= Sher Khan Nashir =

Father of Kunduz

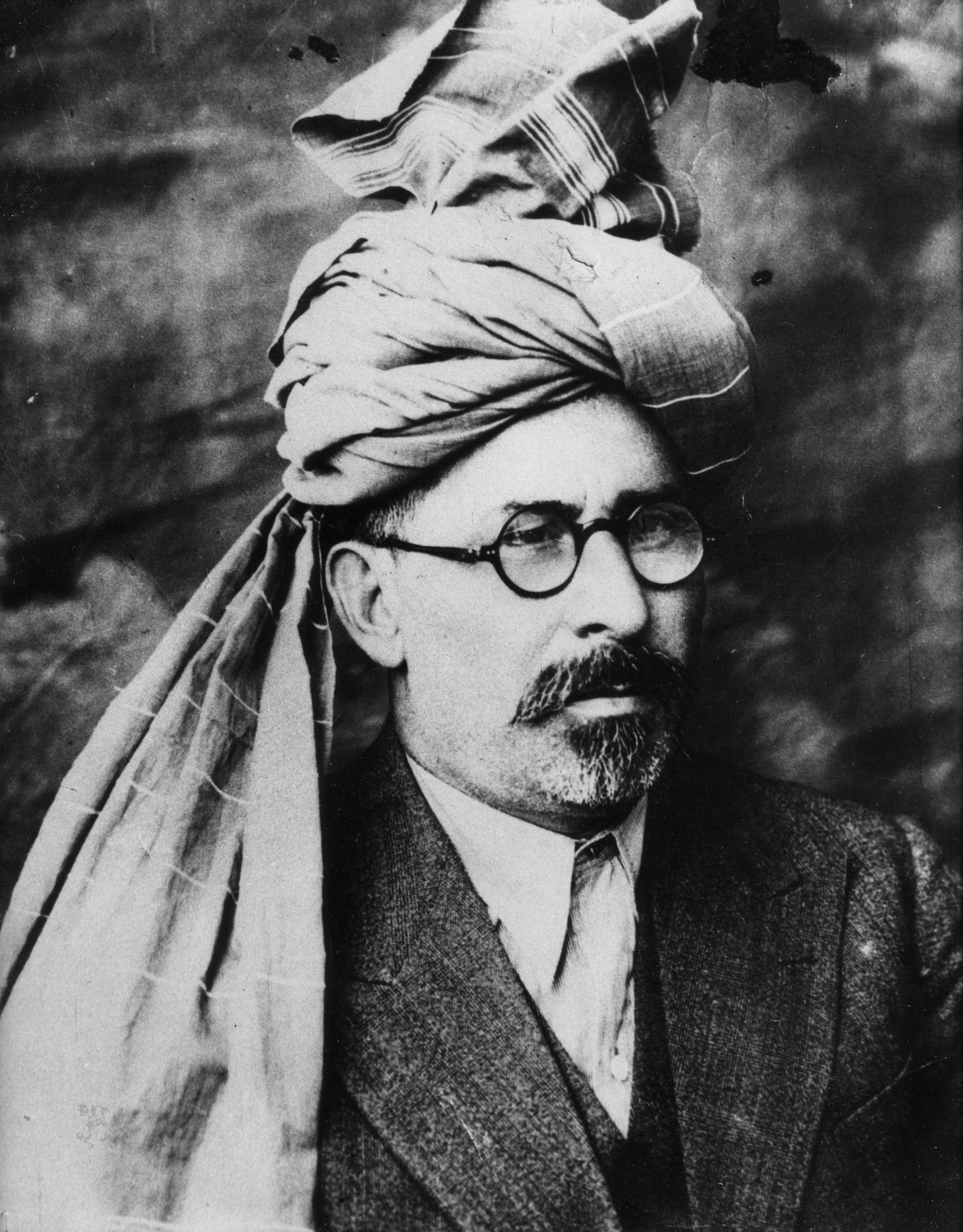
Sher Khan Nashir (1910)

Sher Khan Nashir (also: Nasher) was the hereditary Grand Khan (Loy Khan) of the Nashir clan of the Kharoti (Ghilji) tribe and governor (Wali) of Northern Afghanistan in the 1930s, known as the "father of Kunduz. He was apparently poisoned by the King of Afghanistan. Many places, schools and Afghanistan's largest port Sher Khan Bandar are named after him.

== Life ==
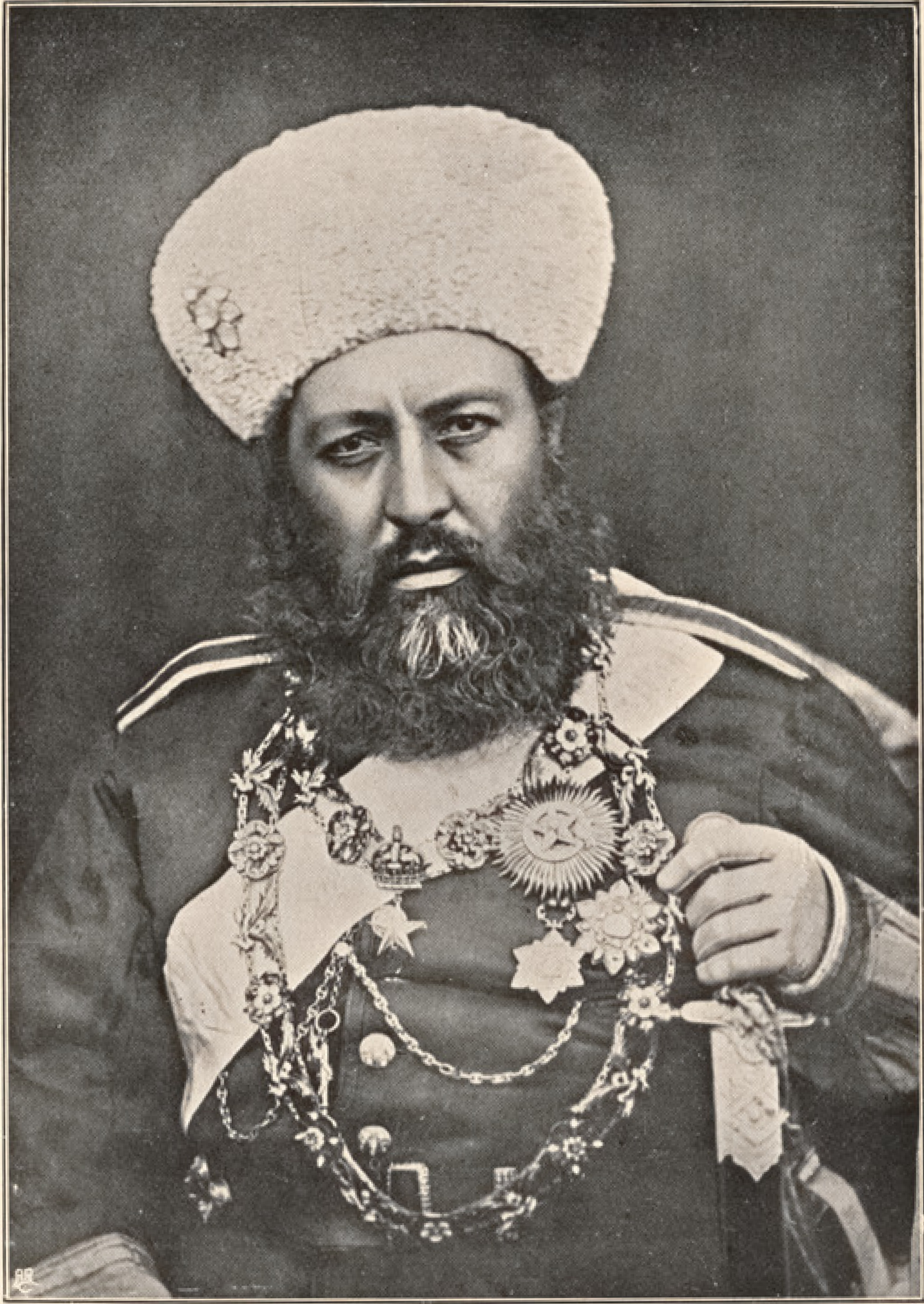
Abdur Rahman Khan

Born as the son of the Khan of the Nasher clan of Ghilji Kharoti Pashtuns, he left Ghazni in the early 20th century as the Nasher family was exiled by the ruling Durrani King Amir Abdur Rahman Khan in order to weaken his nemesis. Sher Khan launched an industrialization campaign with major urban development and construction programmes of what then became Kunduz. He is also known as the founder of the Spinzar Cotton Company in Afghanistan, and implemented Qizel Qala harbour that was later named Sher Khan Bandar. In addition, several schools in Afghanistan are named after him. There are rumours he was killed by the leading Barakzai king for fear of being de-throned by a Ghilji Khan. He is buried in the Qarabagh District of Ghazni Province where he was born.

== Legacy ==
His nephew Ghulam Sarwar Nasher continued the economic development and transformed Kunduz into a thriving city with new residential housing, schools, and hospitals for the Spinzar factory workers. Kunduz became one of the wealthiest Afghan provinces, Spinzar Cotton Company became the largest and most successful private enterprise in the country with about 20,000 employees. He also ran different mine companies in Panjshir. The Afghan singer Farhad Darya Nasher is his nephew. Several schools were named after Sher Khan Nasher, including a recent High School named as Sher Khan Afghan High School in the Qarabagh District of Ghazni Province, where the Nashir shrine exists with many high-profile graduates, such as Hekmatyar, Farhad Darya Nashir, Dr. Saddrudin Sahar and Suleman Kakar.

== See also ==
- History of Afghanistan
- Pasthuns
- Politics of Afghanistan
- Kunduz
- Ghilji
- Kharoti
- Nasher clan
