= Siege of Jalalabad (1928–1929) =

- Part of the Afghan Civil War (1928–1929)
- Siege of Jalalabad (1928–1929) (Afghanistan)
Date	14 November 1928 – 4 January 1929 (1 month and 3 weeks)
Location	Jalalabad, Eastern Province, Kingdom of Afghanistan 34°26′03″N 70°26′52″E
Result	Afghan government victory
Territorial changes	Government retains control over Jalalabad; siege is lifted; Government restores control over the Eastern Province by 4 January

Belligerents
Kingdom of Afghanistan	Rebel tribes; Shinwari; Mohmand (until December); Khogyani

Commanders and leaders
Garrison at Jalalabad: (Kingdom of Afghanistan) Sher Ahmad Khan; Reinforcements: (Kingdom of Afghanistan) Mahmud Khan Yawar (POW); (Kingdom of Afghanistan) Ali Ahmad Khan	Mohammad Alam Khan; Mohammad Afzal

Strength
Unknown	300 (initially); 10,000 (by 15 December)

The Siege of Jalalabad was the first military engagement of the Afghan Civil War of 1928–1929.

On 14 November 1928, the Shinwari tribe rebelled and besieged Jalalabad. Shortly afterwards, they drew a manifesto of ten grievances, five of which related to what they saw as Amanullah Khan's improper meddling with the status of women. However, during the Shinwari rebellion (1930), the Shinwari claimed that the 1928 revolt was "not so much anti-Amanullah as against the local tax-collectors at Jelalabad".

The only link to the besieged city was by airplane. On 16–17 November, Dakka was unsuccessfully attacked. Afghan posts were disarmed, Achin's treasury was looted of Rs. 60,000, and the fort of Kahi was captured after token resistance. The government dispatched troops, munitions, and Russian-piloted bombers to defeat the rebels.

By the end of November, Jalalabad faced investment by Shinwaris, Khugianis, and some Mohmands. A sortie on 1 December temporarily drove the rebels back, but the siege continued. A failed rebel assault on 5 December cost them 800 casualties. By 15 December, the rebels tallied at 10,000, then boosted by a victory at Nimla on 18 December. Meanwhile, the Saqqawist threat to Kabul diverted Afghan government focus from relieving Jalalabad.

Ali Ahmad Khan, a former governor of Kabul, was dispatched to Jalalabad to resolve the crisis. Negotiations with the Shinwaris were underway by the end of December, and on 4 January 1929, a treaty ended the siege. The terms of the treaty officially remained secret. Fayz Muhammad wrote that Ali "managed to pacify the rebels, winning over the savage Shinwaris to the amir with cash and other gifts"

== Background ==
=== Rebel motives ===
Shortly after launching the rebellion, the Shinwari drew up a manifesto of ten grievances, five of which related to what they saw as Amanullah's unsupportable meddling with the status of women. However, during the Shinwari rebellion (1930), the Shinwari claimed that the 1928 revolt was "not so much anti-Amanullah as against the local tax-collectors at Jelalabad".

== Timeline ==
=== November 1928 ===
The rebellion was started on 14 November 1928, by a lashkar of about 300 Sangu Khel and Ailsher Kehl Shinwaris attacking and looting Pesh Bolak and government buildings at Achin; cutting telephone and telegraph lines between Dakka and Jalalabad, and holding up motor traffic between these two places. The government's only means of communication with the besieged city was by airplane.

The British Legation lorry on its way to Kabul was stopped at Dakka by the Sarhaddar, and sent back to Peshawar. On the night of 16–17 November, Dakka was attacked without success, one Afghan gunner being killed. Sniping occurred again during the night of 18–19 November. Small Afghan posts in the vicinity of the Dakka-Jalalabad road were disarmed, and the Afghan Government Treaqury at Achin was looted of Rs. 60,000. The fort of Kahi was attacked and captured during night of 19–20 November. The garrison made a show of resistance, and then deserted.

The Afghan Government appeared to take no active measures to crush the rebellion by force at the outset. 10 lorries carrying troops and munitions were sent to Dakka from Jalalabad, and some bombs were dropped on Shinwari villagers by airplanes from Kabul, piloted by Russians.

Subsequently

- 2 Battalions Infantry
- 1 Squadron Cavalry
- 12 Pack Guns
- 6 Machine Guns
- 12 Lewis Guns

were sent to Jalalabad from Kabul.

On 26 November, Ghulam Sadiq, the Afghan Foreign Minister, and Sher Ahmad Khan, President of the Council of State, were sent to Jalalabad by King Amanullah, with full powers to deal with the situation. The Shinwaris endeavoured to persuade the Mohmands to join them, but, restrained by the Chaknaur Mullah, the Mohmands showed no real inclination do so.

During the night of 29–30 November, some lorries and government buildings outside the city of Jalalabad were burnt. The King's Palace was completely destroyed. The investment of Jalalabad by Shinwaris, assisted by Khugianis and a few Mohmands, then commenced.

=== December 1928 ===
On 1 December, the garrison made a sortie under cover of artillery and machine-gun fire, and drove the insurgents back to the hills south of Jalalabad. The investment was, however, continued. On 5 December, rebels launched a large assault to capture Jalalabad, but loyalist troops repelled the attack; the rebels suffered 800 casualties and many prisoners were taken. On 9 December, an armistice was arranged between the two sides, pending negotiation of a settlement.

On 14 December, it was reported that Shinwari rebels were not observing the truce, and that bombing operations were underway.

During the night of 17–18 December, Mohmands under the leadership of the Chaknaur Mullah occupied Dakka without fighting. There was no disturbance, and the Sarhaddar remained in the town. In Kabul, the Afghan Government began to recruit tribal levies with energy. The reason for this step appeared to be that no reliance could be placed upon the troops.

The negotiations between the insurgents and the Afghan Government were unsuccessful. Ghulam Sadiq returned to Kabul by air, taking with him the rebels' terms, which included:

- I. Cancellation of the Reforms.
- II. Abolition of Hasht Nafri.
- III. Recall to Afghan girls sent to Europe for education in Afghanistan.
- IV. No interference with Mullahs.
- V. No retaliatory measures to be taken against the rebels.

These terms were never agreed to by the Afghan Government; in fact, it is doubtful if they were ever seriously considered. The negotiations had one successful result, in that the Mohmands withdrew their support from the rebels. It is probable that they were heavily bribed to do so.

On 14 December, Shinwari villages were bombed, causing 15 casualties. By 15 December, the rebels numbered at 10,000 men. On 17 December, The Christian Science Monitor reported that the rebels had ceased negotiations and captured Kaja. On 18 December, the Khugianis surrounded Afghan troops at Nimla, 27 miles (43 km) west of Jalalabad. Soon after, the rebels attacked and captured Nimla and looted the camp of Mahmud Khan Yawar, a Foreign Office representative who had been sent from Kabul to assist in the negotiations. Some 1,000 tribal reinforcements who were at Nimla on their way to Jalalabad from Kabul were disarmed and dispersed.

The success at Nimla heartened the insurgents, whose numbers increased considerably. On 20 December, it was reported that Laghmanis had joined in the rising, and that considerable concentrations of rebels with standards had been seen at Darunta, 12 miles (19 km) west of Jalalabad. Besud, a small town opposite Jalalabad on the north bank of the Kabul River, was looted by insurgents during the night of 21–22 December.

On 22 December, it was reported that the Saqqawist attack on Kabul was distracting the government from relieving Jalalabad.

On 27 December, it was reported that the rebels had three demands in a "recent" message:

1. That no foreign legations should be permitted to remain in Afghanistan
2. That no more Afghan students should be sent abroad abroad to study
3. That a party of fifteen Afghan girls who had been sent to Turkey to complete their education be recalled.

By this time, Amanullah's mother, Sarwar Sultana Begum, had flown to Jalalabad, encouraging the troops and citizenry to stand firm.

The investment of Jalalabad continued, but the threatened attack on the town did not take place, because of the general desire, already noted, to avoid bloodshed and rioting on a large scale. The rebels are reputed to have stated that their quarrel was with Afghan Government officials alone. The investment of Jalalabad gradually slackened, however, probably due to the appearance of Ali Ahmed Khan, a former governor of Kabul who had been sent to the Eastern Province by Amanullah with orders to take charge of the situation.

=== Ali Ahmad Khan's intervention ===
Although historical accounts of the 1928–1929 civil war agree that Ali Ahmad Khan played a key role in bringing about the end of the Shinwari revolt, there is some discrepancy regarding the chronology of his intervention:

- In Progressive Afghanistan (1933), Mohammed Ali writes that, after the fall of Nimla on 18 December, Sher Ahmad Khan began negotiating with the rebels. However, the rebels demanded Amanullah's abdication and the departure of Mahmud Tarzi's family from Afghanistan. Sher Ahmad Khan was not in a position to agree with these demands and informed Amanullah, who then sent Ali Ahmad Khan to negotiate as he had more local influence.
- In Kabul under Siege (1999), Robert D. McChesney likewise states that Amanullah sent Ali Ahmad Khan to the eastern province with regular troops, militia levies and sizaeble treasury to bring the rebels to submission. However, McChesney states that Amanullah sent him on 3 December, weeks before the fall of Nimla.
- A British document from 1932 states that Ali Ahmad Khan arrived in Jalalabad on 6 December 1928.

He was negotiating with the rebels by 31 December at the latest, as confirmed by a contemporary The Irish Times report. The rebels maintained the siege while negotiations were underway.

On 4 January 1929, the Shinwari signed a treaty with Ali Ahmad Khan and lifted the siege. The terms of the treaty were not disclosed. Fayz Muhammad wrote that Ali Ahmad Khan "managed to pacify the rebels, winning over the savage Shinwaris to the amir with cash and other gifts". Thus, after many jirgas, Ali Ahmad Khan had succeeded in putting a stop to the investment of Jalalabad and in pacifying the tribes.

The gates of Jalalabad city were opened, and Ali Ahmad Khan entered the town accompanied by a few rebel maliks and followers, both Khugiani and Shinwari. He ordered lists of stores to be made out in the presence of these leaders, and guards were placed over them. Afghan regular soldiers were allowed to retain their arms, but all tribal levies were dismissed. It appears that a paper was signed by influential men of the Jalalabad area, such as the Naqib Sahib of Charbagh, the Chaknaur Mullah, and the Hadda Mulla, declaring Amanullah to be a kafir and Ali Ahmad Khan to be king. The ceremony of tying a pagri around the head of Ali Ahmad Khan was carried out. At the same time, the tribes were suspicious of his intentions and did not trust him. At no time was it clear whether he was working to restore order on Amanullah's behalf, or whether he was scheming to obtain power for himself in the Eastern Province.

An indication that he was playing political games is the fact that Haji Mohammed Akbar, the official in charge of the Frontier Tribes Department of the Afghan Foreign Office, who had taken part in the negotiations between Ali Ahmad Khan and the Shinwaris, left Jalalabad for Peshawar, expressing his dissatisfaction with the manner in which Ali Ahmad Khan conducted the negotiations, and desiring to dissociate himself from any responsibility regarding his actions. He subsequently joined Amanullah in Kandahar.

== Leading figures ==
=== Government ===
- Sher Ahmad Khan led the defense of Jalalabad.
- Mahmud Khan Yawar was sent to reinforce Jalalabad in December 1928, but was defeated at Nimla and captured. He had no prior military experience.
  - His name rendered as Yawar Mahmud Jan in a British report.
- Ali Ahmad Khan was sent to Jalalabad in December 1928 with troops and money and ultimately brought the rebels to submission.

=== Rebels ===
- Mohammad Alam Khan was the main Shinwari leader. He previously held the appointment of Civil Brigadier and was the chief instigator of Shinwari opposition to "Hasht Nafri" (compulsory recruitment of 1 in 8, introduced by King Amanullah).
- Mohammad Afzal was another Shinwari rebel leader. He had earlier been in command of the Jalalabad Division in 1926, and served during the Third Anglo-Afghan War and Khost rebellion (1924–1925).
