= Mir Zaman Khan =

War Hero of Afghanistan's Independence

Ghazi Mir Zaman Khan
- غازي میر زمان خان

Personal details
- Born: 1869 Kunar, Emirate of Afghanistan
- Died: February 1929 (aged 60) Shinkorak Mosque, Kunar, Saqqawist Afghanistan
- Children: Sher Mohammad; Esmatullah Khan; Mohammad Hashem Zamani
- Known for: Fought for Afghanistan's Independence
- Nickname: Lōy Khan

Military service
- Allegiance: Emirate of Afghanistan
- Branch/service: Royal Afghan Army
- Years of service: 1919-1929
- Battles/wars: Red Jihad of 1908; Bazar Valley; 1919 Anglo-Afghan War; Battle of Bagh; Afghan Civil War X

Ghazi Mir Zaman Khan, who became known as Loy Khan Ghazi Mir Zaman Khan Kunari was a Royal Afghan Army General and War Hero of the Afghan War of Independence who fought for Pashtun freedom against the British Empire. He is regarded as a National Hero in Afghanistan.

== Early life ==
Mir Zaman was born the son of Haji Gulroz Khan in 1869 in Lamattak village, Kunar Province of Afghanistan. He is identified with the Safi tribe. His great-grandfather was Mohammad Akram Khan who left the Tirah Valley due to tribal conflict and settled in Kunar.

== Politics and military career ==
From a young age Mir Zaman felt a strong hostility towards the British Raj and its encroachment on the Pashtunistan area. This drew him closer to the tribal leaders of the North-West Frontier of British India leading him to join them in the Sra Ghaza (Red Jihad) of 1908 during the Bazar Valley and Mohmand Expedition.

Due to his frequent activity in crossing the Durand line when fighting the British, Emir Habibullah detained him out of suspicion till the King himself had died in February 1919, and Mir Zaman was released. He caught the attention of Amanullah Khan as a courageous anti-British fighter, he built up a strong influence around the tribes of Kunar and had a close relationship with the Amir, whose mother considered him as her own "adopted son".

=== Anglo-Afghan War of 1919 ===
In 1919, Afghanistan declared a holy war against British India and the call was answered by over 100,000 Afghans from both sides of the Durand. Mir Zaman fought in the Chatral front in the areas of Asmar and Arnawai where he led the tribes to victory over the British.

He was decorated with various medals after the war by the government of Ghazi Amanullah Khan, he became a member of the government council or Shura-i-Daylat and participated in the first Loya Jirgah of post-independence Afghanistan in 1921 at Jalalabad.

=== Afghan rebellions ===
Mir Zaman Khan stayed loyal to Amanullah Khan and partook in operations against the Khost revolt of the Khostwal tribes and the Shinwari rebellion.

He remained loyal to Amanullah Khan through his reforms and modernisation, his second-eldest son Esmatullah Khan fought with him in the Afghan Civil War of 1928. Mir Zaman Khan and his Kunari tribals were sent to Jalalabad by the King Amanullah Khan to put down the rebellion and they were successful in holding their positions against multiple waves of major assaults of a large number of rebels.

== Martyrdom in the Civil War ==
In February 1929, the Commander of the Royal Afghan force in Jalalabad, Sardār Ali Ahmad Khan rebelled and proclaimed himself King of Afghanistan. Mir Zaman then left on a campaign for Kunar Province to gather support to attack the forces of Habibullāh Kalakāni. He was assassinated while in his prayers at a mosque in Kunar as revenge for Mir Zaman's attack on the Shinwari at Jalalabad during the war by the Shinwaris of Shegal.

In early 1929, Amanullah Khan abdicated the throne as the Emir of Afghanistan. The son of the late Mir Zaman Khan, Esmatullah Khan joined Amanullah Khan to Kandahar and accompanied him, taking part in small clashes of the King's accompanying army till Quetta, Baluchistan. Esmatullah Khan was taken into custody at Peshawar and offered a large amount of land and property in exchange for his Zamani family to abandon their anti-British stance, they warned him of an unhopeful future in post-Amanullah Afghanistan but he rejected the offer and was secretly guided back to Afghanistan by Mohmand tribesmen.

A Pashto poem lavishing praise on Mir Zaman Khan:

خاني ستا په نوم کړي فخر ته يې فخر د خانانو
تاريخ ستا يادونه ستايي ته يې فخر د ځوانانو 
Lordship prides itself on you, you are the pride of lordship
History savors your memories, you are the pride of the young
