= Battle of Unai Pass =

- Part of the Afghan Civil War (1928–1929)
Date	28 June – 8 July 1929 (main phase); fighting on the same front continued until late August 1929
Location	Unai Pass, Sarchashma and Jalrez, west of Kabul
Result	Saqqawist forces took the pass on 29 June and sacked Sarchashma; Hazara counter-offensive from 3 July drove them back to Jalrez

Belligerents
Hazaras of Behsud, acting for Amanullah Khan and his brother Prince Muhammad Amin	Saqqawists

Commanders and leaders
Fateh Mohammad Khan; Colonel Khayr Muhammad †; Colonel Gul Muhammad	Hamidullah; Muhammad Siddiq; Umara Khan (WIA); Habibullah Kalakani

Strength
Fewer than 100 defenders at the pass on 29 June; about 3,000 at Sarchashma on 17 August	About 50 men on 28 June; about 5,000 by early July

Casualties and losses
Not recorded; 34 men and 40 women taken prisoner at Sarchashma	Heavy; several hundred prisoners and about 30 guns reported captured

The fullest account is the diary of Fayz Muhammad Katib Hazara, who was in Kabul throughout and had been sent to Behsud in June 1929 with a delegation charged with obtaining Hazara allegiance.

== Background ==
Hazaras from Behsud had held the Unai Pass since early April 1929, refusing allegiance to Habibullah Kalakani and citing the oath they had sworn to Amanullah Khan. Their levies were nominally under Prince Muhammad Amin, Amanullah's brother, whose headquarters lay in Behsud. Fayz Muhammad names Fateh Mohammad as head of the levy stationed at the pass. A delegation of Kabul Qizilbash sent in June to obtain their submission failed; its leader, Nur al-Din Jawanshir, was seized by the Hazaras on 18 June.

== Saqqawist offensive, 28 June – 1 July ==
On 28 June, Hamidullah, Habibullah Kalakani's brother, left Kabul with about fifty men. At Qala-e Karim, near the pass, he shelled the village, killed a man and a girl of eight or nine, and ordered the forts burned. Men from Takana, Jalrez and Kohna Khumar joined the looting; Fayz Muhammad attributes the denunciation of the villagers to a local landowner's dispute with them over land and water. Forty women and children were taken to Qala-e Safid.

The pass itself fell on 29 June. Fayz Muhammad states that fewer than a hundred defenders remained, the rest having returned home. Colonel Khayr Muhammad was killed and his head displayed in the Kabul bazaar. Hamidullah advanced to Rabat-e Juqul on 30 June, burning forts along the road. On 1 July his men sacked Sarchashma, a Shia village that had already submitted and had supplied his troops; Hajji Sultan Muhammad was shot, about 1.5 million rupees of property was carried off, and 34 men and 40 women were taken to Kabul.

== Hazara counter-offensive, 3–10 July ==
On 2 July Hamidullah had Nur al-Din, the Qizilbash envoy Mir Aqa and Fayz Muhammad himself beaten with cudgels at the Kabul municipal office. The following day the Hazaras ambushed his column near Juqul. Of 84 men, four escaped; machine guns and light guns were captured.

On 4 July Habibullah had a proclamation printed giving the Hazaras ten days to send their submission and naming Nur al-Din Khan and Fayz Muhammad among the envoys already sent to them. After eleven days of fighting, on 8 July, a Saqqawist force of about 5,000 was driven back to Jalrez. The Hazaras captured guns and prisoners, and burned Qala-e Majid and several villages of Jalrez in reprisal for Sarchashma. On 9 July farmans were sent to the Sulaymankhel, Kakar, Taraki, Andar and other nomad tribes, promising them Hazara land and property in return for attacking Hazarajat. On 10 July Umara Khan, who had undertaken to subdue the Hazaras, was wounded in the foot; Fayz Muhammad puts his losses at 500 men and 19 officers.

== Later fighting, July and August ==
The Hazaras attacked again at Unai and Qala-e Safid on 17 July. On 23 July Habibullah came to Jalrez himself, shot sixteen deserters, and killed Sayyid Abu'l-Qasim of Takana; the Hazaras came close to capturing him before he left by car. They entered Jalrez on 27 July, a regiment of some 1,300 men abandoning the position. A night attack followed on 3 August, in which, according to Fayz Muhammad, 800 Saqqawist soldiers died in confused fighting among themselves. A night raid on Sarchashma on 9 August yielded 700 prisoners with their weapons. On 17 August an attempt to seize Hazara negotiators at Sarchashma was defeated by about 3,000 men in ambush, who took 400 prisoners. A servant questioned in Kabul in early August put Saqqawist losses on this front at more than 2,000 and said the Hazaras had taken about thirty guns.

The Hazaras did not advance on Kabul. Their ulama had ruled that, Amanullah having abdicated and left the country, only defensive war was lawful.

== End of the campaign ==
Resistance ended through negotiation rather than defeat. Nadir Ali of Jaghuri brought in the submission of Jaghuri and Malistan in late July and wrote to the Behsudis urging them to follow. On 20 August the prisoners taken at Sarchashma were released and sent home in hired carriages, the Hazaras having made their release and an indemnity of 1.5 million rupees a condition of any allegiance. A party of Behsud chiefs with their retainers reached Kabul on 24 August, and on 25 August twenty-five Behsud notables, together with eleven from the Ghazni Hazaras, were received by Habibullah. Habibullah was overthrown by Mohammed Nadir Shah in October 1929.

== Sources ==
Almost everything known about the fighting comes from one participant-observer, Fayz Muhammad, a Hazara and a partisan of Amanullah, who was beaten by Hamidullah's men in Kabul on 2 July 1929. He often marks rumour as such, but his casualty figures for the Saqqawists are uniformly high and Hazara losses are rarely given. The Persian text was published in 2013 from the manuscript; the English version by McChesney, published in 1999, was made from A. I. Shkirando's Russian translation and is abridged and re-worked.

== Bibliography ==
- Fayz Muhammad Kātib Hazāra (2013). Amiri, Ali (ed.). Tadhakkur al-Inqilāb (in Persian). Cologne: Kawa. Scanned copy: in the Internet Archive reader, printed page p is leaf n(p−2), e.g. p. 284 at /page/n282.
- Fayz Muhammad (1999). Kabul Under Siege: Fayz Muhammad's Account of the 1929 Uprising. Translated by McChesney, Robert D. Princeton: Markus Wiener. ISBN 1558761543.
