= Sayyid Husayn =

Saqqawist during the 1928–29 Afghan civil war

Sayyid Hussein Khan charikari
- سیدحسین خان چاریکاری (Persian)
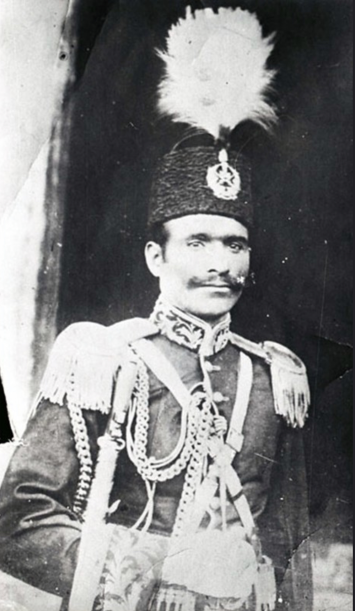

Minister of Defence
- In office January 1929 – March 1929
- Monarch: Habibullāh Kalakāni
- Preceded by: Position established Abdul Aziz Barakzai (as minister of war)
- Succeeded by: Purdil Khan

Personal details
- Born: c. 1895 Charikar, Emirate of Afghanistan
- Died: 1 November 1929 (aged 33–34) Kabul, Kingdom of Afghanistan
- Political affiliation: Saqqawists

Sayyid Hussein Khan charikari (Persian: سیدحسین خان چاریکاری, romanized: Seyed Hosein Xāne Čārikāri) was an Afghan Tajik and politician who served as Minister of Defence from January to March 1929. He was appointed by Habibullāh Kalakāni immediately following the capture of Kabul in January 1929 during the Afghanistan Civil War. In March 1929, he was succeeded by Purdil Khan.

Born c. 1895 in Charikar, Husayn had been a loyal follower of Kalakāni prior to the civil war, and was intimately involved in the Saqqawist leadership. Robert D. McChesney described him as Kalakāni's "partner and virtual equal in matters of government".

He was executed in Kabul on 1 November 1929, alongside Kalakāni and other prominent Saqqawists.
