= Amanite =

Amanite may refer to:

- Amanita, a genus which contains about 600 species of agarics.
- Amanita Design, a Czech independent video game developing company.
- An Amanullah loyalist, someone who supported the restoration of Amanullah Khan as king of Afghanistan.
