= Republic of Afghanistan =

The Republic of Afghanistan may refer to:

- Republic of Afghanistan (1973–1978)
- Democratic Republic of Afghanistan (1978–1992), was renamed as the Republic of Afghanistan from 1987 to 1992
- Islamic Republic of Afghanistan (2004–2021)

== See also ==
- Emirate of Afghanistan (1823–1926)
- Emirate of Afghanistan (1929)
- Kingdom of Afghanistan (1926–1973)
- Islamic State of Afghanistan (1992–2001)
- Islamic Emirate of Afghanistan (1996–2001)
- Transitional Islamic State of Afghanistan (2002–2004)
