= Purdil Khan =

Saqqawist during the 1928–29 Afghan civil war

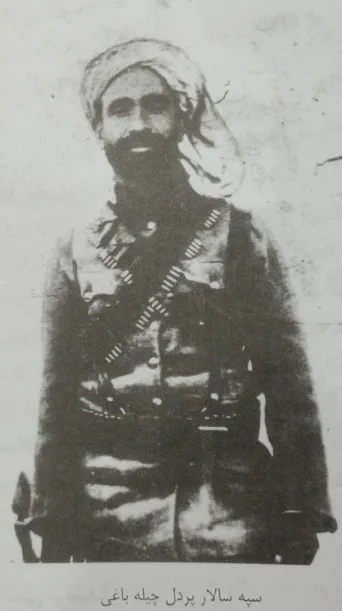

Minister of Defence
- In office March 1929 – October 1929
- Monarch: Habibullāh Kalakāni
- Preceded by: Sayyid Husayn
- Succeeded by: Shah Mahmud Khan

Personal details
- Died: July 1930 modern-day Kapisa Province, Kingdom of Afghanistan
- Political affiliation: Saqqawists

Purdil Khan (Note: Persian: پردل خان, romanized: Purdil Khān) (died 1930) was an Afghan Saqqawist politician who served as minister of defence under Habibullāh Kalakāni during the Afghan Civil War of 1928–29, and briefly became the leader of the movement during a rebellion in July 1930.

== Personal life ==
Purdil was the uncle of Habibullāh Kalakāni.

== Role in the 1928–29 civil war ==
Purdil was appointed field marshal of the Saqqawist Afghan army in January 1929, following the capture of Kabul. By 24 March, Purdil had become minister of defense.

After the Saqqawist capture of Kandahar, Purdil pleaded to Kalakani that Ali Ahmad Khan be spared, but this was refused.

Purdil took command in the following battles:

- Battle of Maydan, 24 March 1929. Saqqawist victory.
- Battle of Shaykhabad, 9 April 1929. anti-Saqqawist victory.
- Battle of Ghazni, 28 April 1929. Saqqawist victory.
- Siege of Kalat, 19–23 May 1929. Saqqawist victory.
- Capture of Kandahar, 31 May 1929. Saqqawist victory.
- Fall of Kabul, 9–13 October 1929. anti-Saqqawist victory, end of the civil war.

In October 1929, Mohammad Nadir Khan captured Kabul, deposed Kalakani and became the new king of Afghanistan. In this process, Purdil was ousted as minister of defence. Later in 1929, Nadir appointed Shah Mahmud Khan as Purdil's successor.

== Kuhistan rebellion and death ==
Kuhistan rebellion (July 1930)
- A map of modern-day Kapisa Province, where the fighting took place.
Date	July 1930 (1 week)
Location	Kohistan District, Kapisa Province, Kingdom of Afghanistan
Result	Government victory

Belligerents
Kingdom of Afghanistan	Saqqawist rebels

Commanders and leaders
Mohammed Nadir Shah	Purdil Khan †

Casualties and losses
Unknown	3,000 captured

After the end of the civil war, Purdil organized a new revolt. In July 1930, Saqqawists fought against state forces in modern-day Kohistan District, Kapisa Province. The rebellion was crushed within a week. After the rebellion was suppressed, 3000 of the rebels were captured and 11 of the ringleaders were executed, while the rest were allowed to go home and "follow some honest pursuit". Purdil was killed during the fighting.
