= Emirate of Afghanistan (1929) =

Unrecognized Afghan state in 1929

Emirate of Afghanistan د افغانستان امارت Da Afġānistān Amārāt امارت افغانستان Amārāt i Afġānistān
- 1929
- Flag Coat of arms

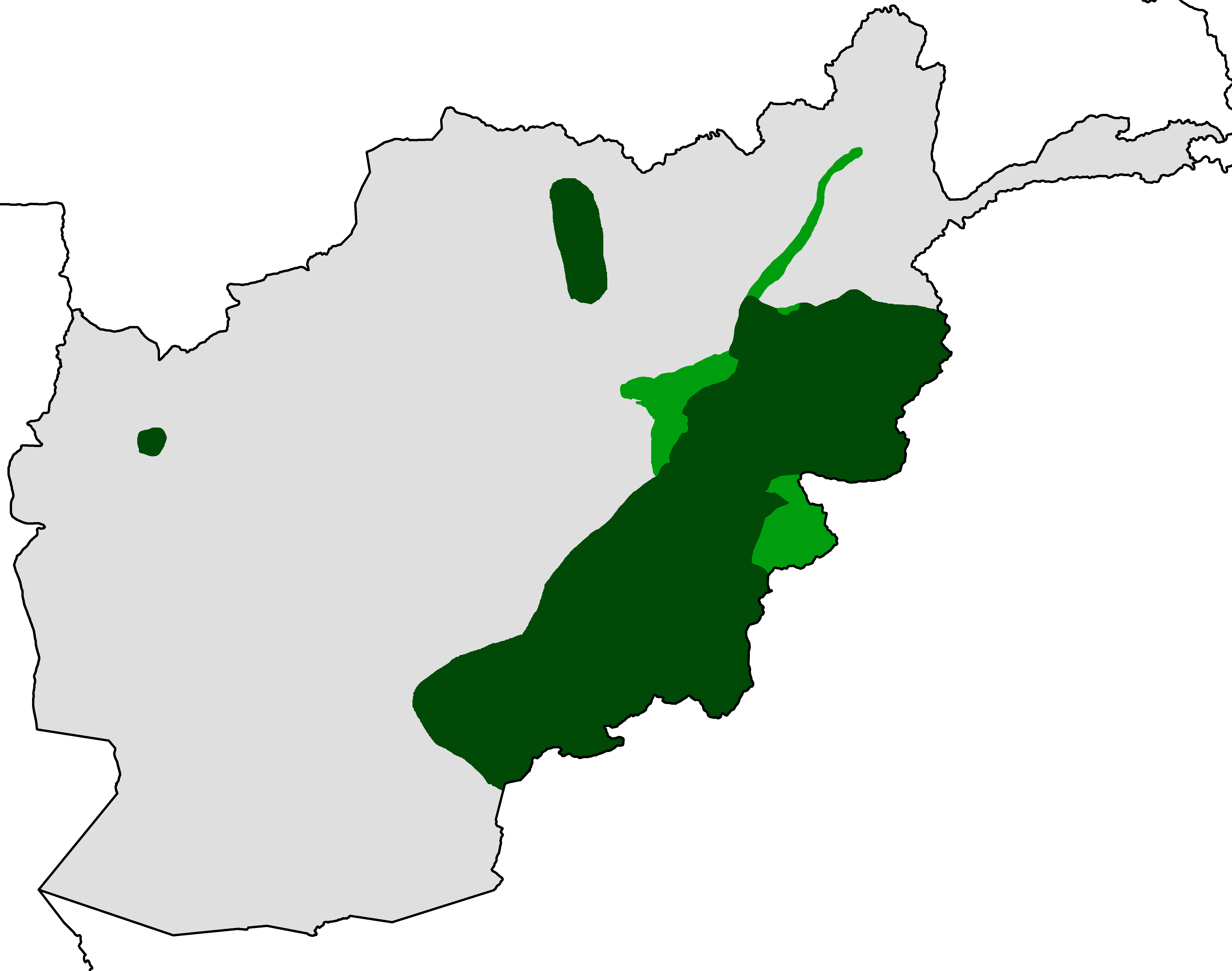
- Saqqawist-held territories at their greatest extent on 31 July 1929; Other territories held by the Saqqawists on at least one point
- Status: Unrecognized emirate
- Capital: Kabul
- Religion: Islam (official)
- Government: Islamic emirate
- Emir and King
  - 1929: Habibullāh Kalakāni
- Historical era: Afghan Civil War (1928–1929)/Interwar Period
  - Habibullāh Kalakāni proclaimed Emir: 14 December 1928
  - Capture of Kabul: 17 January 1929
  - Red Army intervention: April–May 1929
  - Fall of Kalakāni: 13 October 1929

Population
  - 1929: 7,120,000 (Note: This estimate reflects the entire country's population, not merely the Saqqawist-occupied territories.)
- Currency: Afghan afghani
Preceded by	Succeeded by
Kingdom of Afghanistan	Kingdom of Afghanistan
- Today part of: Afghanistan

The Emirate of Afghanistan was a short-lived unrecognized state in Central Asia ruled by the Saqqawists that existed from January to October 1929. Habibullāh Kalakāni became the state's only emir on 18 January 1929. After the fall of Kalakāni on 13 October 1929, the Emirate ended.

Their rule is known in the history of Afghanistan as the Saqqawist period.

== History ==
The emirate emerged during the Afghan Civil War of 1928–1929, a conflict between Saqqawist forces led by Habibullāh Kalakāni and opposing tribes and monarchs within Afghanistan. After early Saqqawist victories, the capture of Kabul in January 1929 marked the establishment of the Saqqawist emirate. Kalakāni's rule, known as the Saqqawist period, was marked by social unrest and military engagements. Eventually, Nadir Khan captured Kabul on 13 October 1929 and disestablished the emirate. The war's aftermath saw Nadir Khan ascend to the throne as Mohammad Nadir Shah and the re-establishment of the Kingdom of Afghanistan.

== Administrative divisions ==
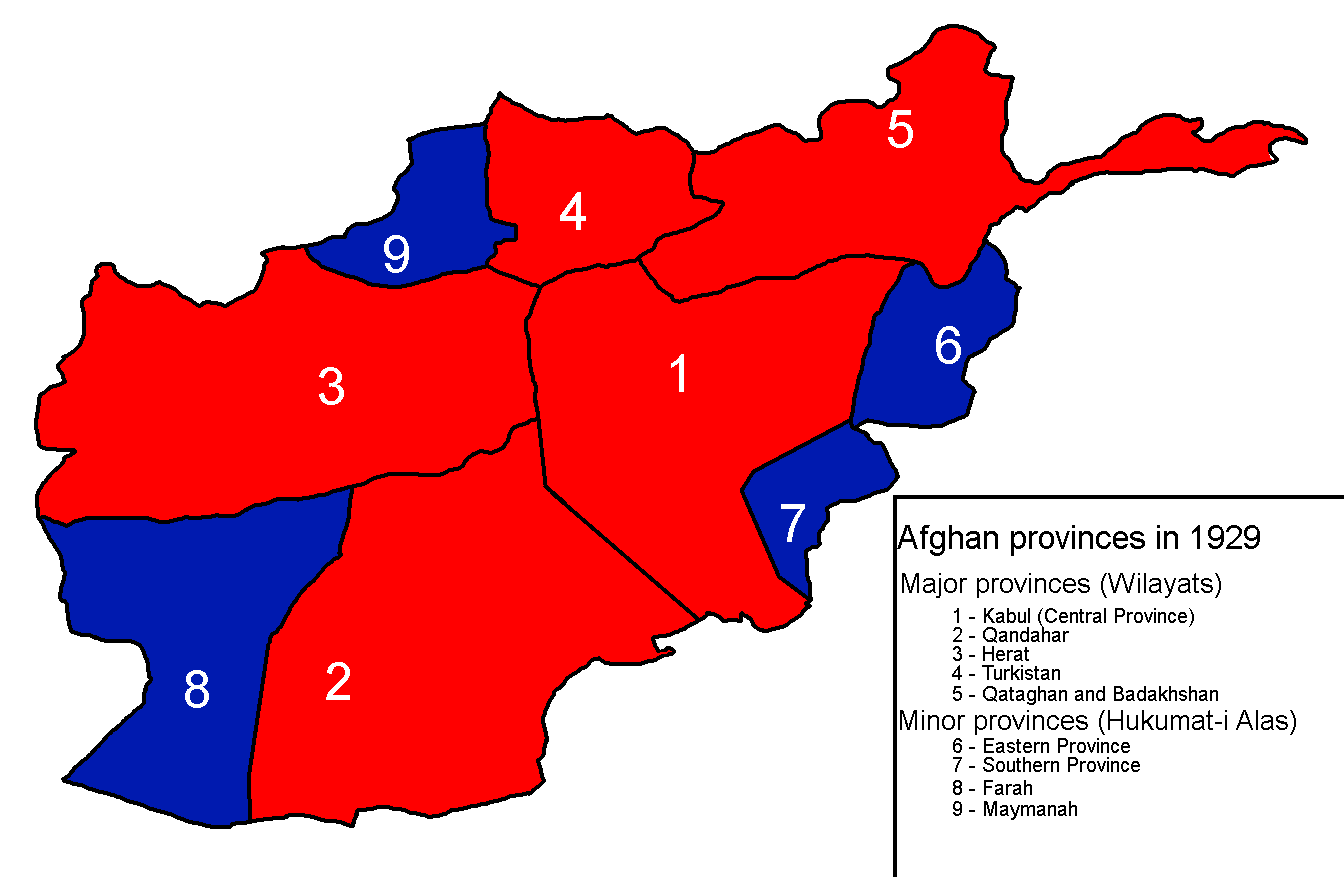
Provinces of Afghanistan in 1929

By 1929, Afghanistan had 9 provinces, consisting of 5 major provinces (wilayats) and 4 minor provinces (Hukumat-i Alas).

The major provinces were:

1. Kabul Province / Central Province
2. Kandahar Province
3. Herat Province
4. Turkestan Province
5. Qataghan-Badakhshan Province

The minor provinces were:

1. Eastern Province
2. Southern Province
3. Farah Province
4. Meymaneh Province

Although these provinces were de jure all part of the emirate, in practice the Saqqawist territories were in a constant state of flux, and never encompassed the entire country. In particular, the Saqqawists never penetrated into the Farah or Meymaneh provinces.

== Government ==
Top-level decision-making essentially fell to two individuals: Habibullāh Kalakāni, the leader of the Saqqawists, and his partner and virtual equal in matters of government, Sayyid Husayn.

=== Cabinet ===
After taking over Kabul, Kalakāni appointed a number of people into office, including:

- Shayr Jan, former cavalry commander, as Minister of Court.
- Ata al-Haqq as foreign minister.
- Abd al-Ghafur Khan, son of Muhammad Shah Tarabi of the Safi tribe, as Minister of the interior.
- Malik Muhsin as governor-general of the Central Province.
- Sayyid Husayn as Minister of Defense.
- Purdil Khan as field marshal of the Army.
- Abd al-Wakil Khan as field marshal of the Army alongside Purdil Khan.
- Hamid Allah as "honorary sardar".
- Sayyid Muhammad as commander of the Arg.
- Mirza Mujtaba Khan as minister of finance.
- Muhammad Mahfuz as war minister.
- Kaka Muhsin of the Kacharlu clan as governor of Hazarahjat (centered on Bihsud).
- Muhammad Karim Khan as governor of Ghazni.
- Khwajah Mir Alam as governor of Mazar-i-Sharif.
- Ghulam Muhammad Khan as governor of Tagab.
- Chighil Khan as governor of Charikar.
- Nadir Ali as governor of Jaghori and Malistan.

=== Civilian policy ===
Once in power, the Saqqawists abolished conscription and taxation, and closed down schools.

On 9 May 1929, Kalakāni passed a decree in Kabul which forbade citizens of Kabul from moving out of the city without permission, even into the government-controlled Bandar-i Arghandah, Charasya, Bini Hisar, Butkhak, Kutal-i Pay Manar, Kutal-i Khayr Khanah, Maydan, Jalriz, Logar, Khurd Kabul, Tangi Gharu or Dih Sabz.

== Economy ==
For a while, Kalakāni relied on the royal treasury to pay his army, without levying taxes. However, when the treasury ran out, taxation was reinstated in order to cover the expenses of his army. Revenue was also collected by forcing wealthy Tajik merchants to contribute to his treasury.

== Demographics ==
The Gapminder Foundation estimates that Afghanistan's population numbered 7.12 million in 1929. This number reflects the entire country and not only the Saqqawist-occupied territories.

== Military ==
The Saqqawists maintained a military during their period of control. On 14 April 1929, Fayz Muhammad estimated the Saqqawists to number 20,000.

A British report in 1932 describes how, from the outbreak of the civil war, the Kabul, Koh-i-Daman and Kohistan areas had been the chief sources for the supply of manpower for the Saqqawists. As Kalakani’s commitments on the various fronts grew, so did his demands for manpower become more incessant. The economic situation which was already in a bad way, thus grew rapidly worse. Tilling of the fields and sowing of crops reached a standstill owing to lack of labour, and the alienation of the support of the leading Maliks and Khans at this time only tended to enhance the already prevalent feeling of discontent and weariness. In addition to this, Kalakani’s treasury was unequal to the severe strain imposed upon it and for the months of July and August the troops received no pay. Their morale was thus so lowered that they were unable to withstand any determined effort made against them.

== Culture ==
The Saqqawist government celebrated Afghan Independence Day for five days (instead of the usual eight) starting on 19 August 1929. Kalakani spent 60,000 Afghan rupees on the celebrations, and hoped he could use the occasion to try to win over the Afghan populace. Kalakani gave a speech on 19 August – the contents of the speech are unknown, but Fayz Muhammed remarked that Kalakani "stood there telling lie after lie about the way things really were."

== International relations ==
Despite taking control of Kabul, the Saqqawist government of Afghanistan was unable to obtain any diplomatic recognition. Nonetheless, the Saqqawists allied themselves with the Basmachi movement, allowing them to operate in Northern Afghanistan, and revoking the "Pact of Neutrality and Non-Aggression" that Afghanistan had signed with the Soviet Union following the end of the Urtatagai conflict, which obligated Afghanistan to restrain Basmachi border raids.

On 6 August 1929, Kalakani announced his intention of despatching a mission to visit certain European countries with a view to obtaining recognition and requested the government of British India to grant transit facilities. In reply, the Raj pointed out that their declared policy of neutrality and non-intervention precluded them from regarding the status of the party while on British territory as other than that of private individuals, and that no assurance could be given as regards their reception at the Foreign Office. The matter was then dropped.
