= Devin Deweese =

American academic (born 1956)

Devin Deweese (born 1956) is a professor of Islamic and Central Eurasian Studies at Indiana University Bloomington, Indiana.

He received his PhD in 1985 at Indiana University Bloomington, and since then has continued to do research on Central Asian Islam, particularly Sufism and its political and social dimensions. He has published major studies of Central Asian religion and history using Persian, Arabic and Turkic manuscript sources he has painstakingly accumulated from collections all over the world. Until 2008, he served as the director of the Denis Sinor Research Institute for Inner Asian Studies at Indiana University. He received a Guggenheim Fellowship in 2003 and was named a Carnegie Scholar in 2006.

His work is widely acknowledged for its importance in Central Asian studies because his precise analysis of manuscript sources helps understand the motivations of the authors of these texts, and places them within the cultural contexts of the manuscript traditions. He is one of a small group of scholars, including Jürgen Paul, Adeeb Khalid, Robert D. McChesney, Jo-Ann Gross, Ashirbek Muminov, Maria Subtelny, Beatrice Forbes Manz, and Stéphane A. Dudoignon, who have worked seriously to debunk prevailing essentialist and ahistorical stereotypes about Sufism, Islam, and politics in the history of Central Asia. Like a very few Central Asian scholars before them, these experts work with equal facility on Arabic, Persian and Turkic, but have also developed working methods that understand concepts and practices of Islam and Islamic communities on the believers' own terms, rather than through biased and invariant concepts.

== Islamization and Native Religion in the Golden Horde ==
Deweese's most well-known work is Islamization and Native Religion in the Golden Horde: Baba Tükles and Conversion to Islam in Historical and Epic Tradition, published by the Penn State University Press in 1994. Called "a truly groundbreaking work" and "an epic book" that has "opened up whole new vistas onto the religious landscape of the Mongol empire and post-Chingizid Inner Asia", the book examines a narrative of Uzbeg Khan's conversion to Islam in the 14th century. It also examines pre-Islamic religious life in Inner Asia, the use of narratives as foundational myths, and the role of Islam and conversion in identity formation. The work won the 1995 Albert Hourani Book Award from the Middle East Studies Association and the 1995 Best First Book in the History of Religions from the American Academy of Religion, and has received praise from many scholars.

== Selected works ==
- Islamization and Native Religion in the Golden Horde: Baba Tükles and Conversion to Islam in Historical and Epic Tradition. Pennsylvania State University Press, 1994 Series "Hermeneutics: Studies in the History of Religions", 638 pp.
- "Khojagani Origins and the Critique of Sufism: The Rehtoric of Communal Uniqueness in the Manaqib of Khoja 'Ali 'Azizan Ramitani," in Islamic Mysticism Contested: Thirteen Centuries of Controversies and Polemics, ed. Frederick De Jong and Bernd Radtke (Leiden: E.J. Brell, 1999) pages 492-519.
- "The Masha'ikh-i Turk and the Khojagan: Rethinking the Links between the Yasavi and Naqshbandi Sufi Traditions," Journal of Islamic Studies (Oxford), 7/2 (July 1996), pages 180-207.
- "The Tadhkira-i Bughra-khan and the "Uvaysi" Sufis of Central Asia: Notes in Review of Imaginary Muslims," Central Asiatic Journal, 40 (1996), pages 87-127.
- "The Descendants of Sayyid Ata and the Rank of Naqib in Central Asia," Journal of the American Oriental Society, 115 (1995), pages 612-634.
- "Sacred Places and 'Public' Narratives: The Shrine of Ahmad Yasavi in Hagiographical Traditions of the Yasavi Sufi Order, 16th-17th Centuries," Muslim World, Fall 2000, Volume 90, Issue 3/4
- "Baba Kamal and Jandi and the Kubravi Tradition among the Turks of Central Asia," Der Islam, 71 (1994), pages 58-94.
