= Amanullah loyalism =

Early 20th century attempts to restore Amanullah Khan as King of Afghanistan

Afghanistan's flag c. 1928 (one of several variants) under King Amanullah

Amanullah loyalism was a series of early 20th century movements in the Kingdom of Afghanistan to restore Amanullah Khan as king of Afghanistan after he was deposed in January 1929 during the Afghan Civil War. Loyalists were sometimes referred to as Amanite. Loyalists tried to achieve this in various ways, including armed rebellions, political parties, colluding with foreign powers and assassinations. These movements petered out by the late 1940s. Amanullah died in exile in 1960 in Zürich, Switzerland, without ever regaining control, except a brief period of control in southern Afghanistan in the 1929 Afghan Civil War.

== Background ==
Amanullah Khan became emir of Afghanistan in 1919, assuming the title of king from 1926. His administration was marked by liberalization and westernization of the country. Mohammad Nadir Khan, a close associate of Amanullah, voiced opposition to his reforms, fearing reaction from the conservative establishment.

In 1928–1929, Afghanistan spiralled into civil war, and Amanullah was deposed in January 1929 by Saqqawist rebels led by Habibullāh Kalakāni. In March 1929, as war continued, Amanullah and Nadir re-entered the country, though Amanullah fled the country in May.

The tide of the war eventually turned against Kalakāni, with Kabul falling to anti-Saqqawist forces on 13 October 1929. After hearing word of the victory, Nadir entered the capital on 15 October. On the 16th, Nadir entered the Dilkusha Palace, expressing his gratitude to those who had backed him. He acknowledged Amanullah Khan’s contributions to the country and, citing his own poor health, made it clear that he had no personal ambition for the throne. Instead, he pledged to support whoever the national Jerga (tribal council) selected as the next ruler. However, the assembled tribal leaders were adamant that Nader himself should take the crown. Raising their rifles, they warned that if he refused, they would abandon Kabul. Faced with their unwavering insistence, Nader Khan ultimately accepted the responsibility and became the King of Afghanistan.

As king, Nadir realized that his earlier opposition to Amanullah's reforms had been vindicated by the civil war. Instead of reinstating the reforms that Kalakani had repealed, Nadir worked to complete the abolition of Amanullah's reforms, strengthening the power of tribal leaders and clerics.

Pro-Amanullah factions in Afghanistan felt betrayed by Nadir's assumption of power, having fought the Saqqawists under the presumption that Amanullah would retake the throne upon their victory. Nadir's strengthening of Anglo-Afghan ties (which included support for British sovereignty over Pashtuns east of the Durand line, and lack of support for the Afridi Redshirt Rebellion) was also a sore point for Afghanistan's Amanites. Hafizullah Emadi (2010) describes the Amanites as nationalist and progressive forces.

== Rebellions ==
=== 1929 Afghan Civil War ===
In March 1929, during the 1929 Afghan Civil War, Amanullah assembled an army in Kandahar made up of Durrani, Khattak, Ghilzai and Hazara fighters. However, his attempt to march on Kabul was unsuccessful, and he retreated to Qalat, where he fell under a Saqqawist siege on 19 May. On 23 May, Qalat fell to the Saqqawists and Amanullah fled to the British Raj.

=== Kuhistan rebellion ===
The Kuhistan rebellion was a rebellion in modern-day Kohistan District, Kapisa which took place in 1930 in the Kingdom of Afghanistan. It began in February 1930, when rebels seeking to restore Amanullah Khan as King of Afghanistan broke out in open rebellion against Mohammed Nadir Shah. After killing many, the rebellion was crushed in mid-April 1930.

=== Shinwari rebellion ===
The Shinwari rebellion was a rebellion by the Shinwari that took place in February or May 1930 in the Kingdom of Afghanistan. The Shinwari sought to depose Mohammed Nadir Shah and restore Amanullah Khan as king of Afghanistan. Due to lack of support by Shinwari elders (who had been bribed by Nadir), the rebellion was promptly suppressed.

The Shinwari's support for Amanullah in 1930 apparently contradicted their earlier revolt against Amanullah in 1928. During this rebellion, the Shinwari claimed that the earlier revolt was "not so much anti-Amanullah as against the local tax-collectors at Jelalabad".

=== Crazy Fakir's rebellion ===
Towards the end of February 1933, a "Crazy Fakir" appeared in the Khost district in the south of Afghanistan, proclaiming that the ex-king Amanullah Khan would soon arrive. At his instigation a number of tribesmen took arms with the intention of marching on Kabul, and they received considerable reinforcements from the Wazir and Mahsud tribes across the Indian border. They met the government troops which were sent south to oppose them in the neighbourhood of Matun, and some sharp fighting took place at the end of February and the beginning of March. The tribesmen from across the border then began to withdraw at the bidding of some of their elders who were sent by the British authorities to recall them, and the uprising soon came to an end. Later in the year one of the ringleaders, Tor Malang, was executed with some of his associates, but the "Crazy Fakir", who fled abroad, was allowed to return with the assurance of a free pardon, on account of his advanced age.

=== Ghilzai rebellion ===
The Ghilzai rebellion was an uprising in the Kingdom of Afghanistan by the Ghilzai tribe in 1938. Its causes laid in a desire to reinstate Amanullah Khan as king of Afghanistan. A relative of Amanullah, Said al-Kailani, also known as the Shami Pir marched on Kabul with an unknown amount of Ghilzai warriors. There are 2 accounts as to how the rebellion ended - according to British records, the rebellion was defeated in the summer of 1938 by the Afghan army using British-supplied rifles. According to Harvey Smith, the rebellion ended after the British bought off Shami Pir following frantic appeals by the Afghan government. In either case, this rebellion prompted the Prime Minister, Mohammad Hashim Khan, to increase subsidies for Pashtun tribes near the Durand line.

Details of the Ghilzai rebellion are preserved in correspondence between William Kerr Fraser-Tytler (British ambassador to Afghanistan) and Edward Wood (British Secretary of State for Foreign Affairs).

=== Mazrak's revolt ===
In February 1944, Mazrak Zadran, an Amanullah loyalist, led an ambush against government troops in the Southern province, after which he was beaten back and forced to retreat into the hills. He continued to fight the Afghan government for the following years. In late 1944, he invaded the British Raj, where he was joined by a Sultan Ahmed, a rebel chieftain from Balochistan. They were later joined by another rebel leader nicknamed Pak.

However, Mazrak's fortunes were not to last. He was evicted from British territory due to British bombardment. In October 1945, most Safi surrendered, followed by the surrender of Sultan Ahmad in November. Nonetheless, Mazrak and his brother Sher Khan continued to fight, refusing to surrender until 11 January 1947.

== Political parties ==
=== Anti-Yahya Khel Party ===
The Anti-Yahya Khel Party (Hizb-i-Zid-Yahya Khel) was a small loyalist political party which was briefly active in 1933. Members of the movement opposed the Musahiban dynasty for political reasons or out of personal spite. In this case, Yahya Khel refers to an alternative name for the Musahiban.

== Collusion with foreign powers ==
=== Soviet Union ===
In 1932, British intelligence reported that the Soviet Union was probably aiming to reinstate Amanullah:

A united Afghanistan is contrary to Soviet interests, and Nadir Khan's increasing strength and power of control is probably viewed with disfavour in Moscow. Evidence goes to show that the aim of the Soviet at the moment is in all probability to bring about the downfall of Nadir and to replace him by Amanullah, or by one of his following, to establish an economic control of the country and thereby provide themselves with an efficient propaganda and intelligence system, to promote dissatisfaction and unrest amongst the tribes on the frontier, and to support the activities of anti-British and anti-Nadir organisations.

=== Nazi Germany ===
During World War II, some western press reported that Amanullah was working as an agent for Nazi Germany in Berlin. It is believed that, he was involved in plans to regain his throne with Axis help, despite Afghanistan's neutrality. However following the Axis loss in Stalingrad in 1943, the plans were given less importance and eventually never executed.

== Assassinations ==
=== Assassination of Mohammed Nadir Shah ===
In November 1933, Mohammed Nadir Shah was assassinated by Abdul Khaliq Hazara, a supporter of Amanullah.

== See also ==
- List of movements that dispute the legitimacy of a reigning monarch
