= Afghan Civil War (1928–1929) =

Military conflict in Afghanistan

- Part of the spillover of the Basmachi movement and the Interwar Period
- An animated map of the Afghan Civil War of 1928–1929. Red are Saqqawists and Blue are Anti-Saqqawists. This map does not show the concurrent Soviet intervention against the Basmachi in northern Afghanistan.
Date	14 November 1928 – 13 October 1929 (10 months, 4 weeks and 1 day / 334 days)
Location	Kingdom of Afghanistan
Result	Anti-Saqqawist victory; Fall of Amanullah Khan's government in January 1929, leading to the establishment of a Saqqawist government.; Saqqawist collapse in October 1929, leading to Mohammed Nādir Khān becoming King of Afghanistan.

Belligerents
Saqqawists (November 1928 – October 1929); Emirate of Afghanistan (January – October 1929); Supported by: Basmachi movement (1929) Shinwari tribesmen (November–December 1928)	Kingdom of Afghanistan Hazara volunteers Various anti-Saqqawist Pashtun tribes: Wardak; Maydan; Jalriz; Sanglakh; Soviet Union (See 1929 Red Army intervention in Afghanistan)

Commanders and leaders
Habibullāh Kalakāni (executed); Sayyid Husayn (executed); Ibrahim Bek; Fayz Allah Mohammad Alam Khan	Amānullāh Khān (Until 14 January 1929; and from 22 March – 23 May 1929); Inayatullah Khan (14–17 January 1929); Ali Ahmad Khan (executed) (17 January – 9 February 1929); Malik Qays; Mohammed Nādir Khān (March–October 1929); Sardar Shah Wali Khan; Mir Zaman Khan X Ghulam Nabi Khan (Note: Killed without trial for alleged treachery (in regards to both Amanullah Khan and Habibullah Kalakani) by the regime of General Nadir Khan) Karim Khan; Abd al-Karim (POW); Hazrat Muhammad Khan

Strength
2,000(14 December 1928); 28 (15 January 1929, Second Battle of Kabul); 20,000 (14 April 1929, country-wide)	80 (16 January 1929); 2,000 (18 January 1929); 12,000 (18 September 1929, final offensive on Kabul) (Soviet Union) 1,000

Casualties and losses
7,500 killed	7,500 killed

The Afghan Civil War of 1928–1929 was fought from 14 November 1928 to 13 October 1929. Rebelling, and subsequently governing Saqqawist (Saqāwīhā) forces under Habibullāh Kalakāni fought against various opposing tribes and rival monarchs in the Kingdom of Afghanistan, among whom Mohammed Nādir Khān eventually achieved a preponderant role. Despite early successes, such as the capture of Kabul and defeat of Amanullah Khan on 17 January 1929 or the capture of Kandahar on 3 June, (Note: According to Encyclopædia Iranica, Kandahar fell on 31 May, while according to Faiz Mohammad, it fell on 3 June.) the Saqqawists were eventually deposed by anti-Saqqawist forces led by Nadir on 13 October 1929, leading to Nadir's ascension as King of Afghanistan. He ruled until his assassination on 3 November 1933.

The war began when the Shinwari tribe revolted, besieged Jalalabad, and drew up a manifesto of 10 grievances, 5 of which related to Amanullah's meddling with the status of women. Although this revolt was quelled by a force led by Ali Ahmad Khan, a concurrent Saqqawist uprising in the north managed to capture the besieged city of Jabal al-Siraj, before attacking Kabul on 14 December 1928. Although the first Saqqawist assault on Kabul was repulsed, the second Saqqawist assault succeeded at capturing Kabul on 17 January 1929. The government at that time was focused on social reforms, such as the expansion of women's rights and the adoption of a military draft, which had earlier led to the unsuccessful Alizai rebellion and Khost rebellion. Kalakani denounced his opponents as kuffar, while his forces committed acts of rape and looting.

After capturing Kabul, the Saqqawists defeated a rival government in Jalalabad led by Ali Ahmad Khan on 9 February. Despite a setback in the Battle of Shaykhabad in early March, the Saqqawists managed to extend their control to Kandahar in June after a short siege. However, they were unable to defeat Nadir Khan in the Logar valley, who had entered the area together with Amanullah in March, although the latter left the country on 23 May. After a months-long stalemate, Nadir Khan eventually managed to force the Saqqawists to retreat into Kabul in October 1929, and subsequently into the Arg. The capture of the Arg on 13 October 1929 marked the end of the civil war, although Saqqawist activity continued until 1931, with the fall of their final holdout, Herat. The civil war was fought concurrently with a Soviet operation in northern Afghanistan to fight the Basmachi movement.

Both sides suffered around 7500 combat deaths during the civil war. During the anti-Saqqawist capture of Kabul, Nadir's forces sacked the city against his orders. After the civil war, Nadir did not cede control of the Afghan throne back to Amanullah, and this led to several rebellions, including the Shinwari rebellion, the Kuhistan rebellion, the Ghilzai rebellion, and Mazrak's revolt. During World War II, Amanullah would unsuccessfully try to regain the throne with Axis help.

== Background ==
Amānullāh Khān reigned in Afghanistan from 1919, achieving full independence from the British Empire shortly afterwards. Before the Treaty of Rawalpindi was concluded in 1921, Afghanistan had already begun to establish its own foreign policy, including diplomatic relations with the Russian Soviet Federative Socialist Republic in 1919. During the 1920s, Afghanistan established diplomatic relations with most major countries.

The second round of Anglo–Afghan negotiations for final peace were inconclusive. Both sides were prepared to agree on Afghan independence in foreign affairs, as provided for in the previous agreement. The two nations disagreed, however, on the issue that had plagued Anglo-Afghan relations for decades and would continue to cause friction for many more — authority over Pashtun tribes on both sides of the Durand Line. The British refused to concede Afghan control over the tribes on the British side of the line while the Afghans insisted on it. The Afghans regarded the 1921 agreement as only an informal one.

The rivalry of the great powers in the region might have remained subdued had it not been for the dramatic change in government in Moscow brought about by the Russian Revolution of 1917. In their efforts to placate Muslims within their borders, the new Soviet leaders were eager to establish cordial relations with neighboring Muslim states. In the case of Afghanistan, the Soviets could achieve a dual purpose: by strengthening relations with the leadership in Kabul, they could also threaten Britain, which was one of the Western states supporting counter-revolution in the Soviet Union. In his attempts to end British control of Afghan foreign policy, Amanullah sent an emissary to Moscow in 1919; Vladimir Lenin received the envoy warmly and responded by sending a Soviet representative to Kabul to offer aid to Amānullāh's government.

Throughout Amānullāh's reign, Soviet-Afghan relations fluctuated according to Afghanistan's value to the Soviet leadership at a given time; Afghanistan was either viewed as a tool for dealing with Soviet Muslim minorities or for threatening the British. Whereas the Soviets sought Amanullah's assistance in suppressing anti-Bolshevik elements in Central Asia in return for help against the British, the Afghans were more interested in regaining lands across the Amu Darya lost to Russia in the nineteenth century. Afghan attempts to regain the oases of Merv and Panjdeh were easily subdued by the Soviet Red Army.

In May 1921, the Afghans and the Soviets signed a Treaty of Friendship, Afghanistan's first international agreement since gaining full independence in 1919. The Soviets provided Amanullah with aid in the form of cash, technology and military equipment. Despite this, Amanullah grew increasingly disillusioned with the Soviets, especially as he witnessed the widening oppression of his fellow Muslims across the border.

Anglo-Afghan relations soured over British fear of an Afghan-Soviet friendship, especially with the introduction of a few Soviet planes into Afghanistan. British unease increased when Amanullah maintained contacts with Indian nationalists and gave them asylum in Kabul, and also when he sought to stir up unrest among the Pashtun tribes across the border. The British responded by refusing to address Amanullah as "Your Majesty," and imposing restrictions on the transit of goods through India.

Amānullāh's domestic reforms were no less dramatic than his foreign policy initiatives, but those reforms could not match his achievement of complete, lasting independence. Mahmud Tarzi, Amanullah's father-in-law and Foreign Minister, encouraged the monarch's interest in social and political reform but urged that it be gradually built upon the basis of a strong central government, as had occurred in Turkey under Kemal Atatürk. Socially, Amanullah enjoyed many of Mahmud Tarzi's thoughts at the time, such as giving women more rights and allowing freedom of press through publishing. Tarzi, being heavily influenced by the West, brought this influence to Afghanistan – Amanullah enjoyed Western dress and etiquette. His wife, Queen Soraya Tarzi, became the face of Amanullah Khan's reforms in regard to women.

Amānullāh's reforms touched on many areas of Afghan life. In 1921 he established an air force, albeit with only a few Soviet planes and pilots; Afghan personnel later received training in France, Italy and Turkey. Although he came to power with army support, Amanullah alienated many army personnel by reducing both their pay and size of the forces and by altering recruiting patterns to prevent tribal leaders from controlling who joined the service. Amanullah's Turkish advisers suggested the king retire the older officers, men who were set in their ways and might resist the formation of a more professional army. Amanullah's minister of war, General Muhammad Nadir Khan, a member of the Musahiban branch of the royal family, opposed these changes, preferring instead to recognize tribal sensitivities. The king rejected Nadir Khan's advice and an anti-Turkish faction took root in the army; in 1924 Nadir Khan left the government to become ambassador to France.

If fully enacted, Amānullāh's reforms would have totally transformed Afghanistan. Most of his proposals, however, died with his abdication. His transforming social and educational reforms included: adopting the solar calendar, requiring Western dress in parts of Kabul and elsewhere, discouraging the veiling and seclusion of women, abolishing slavery and forced labor, introducing secular education (for girls as well as boys); adult-education classes and educating nomads. His economic reforms included restructuring, reorganizing and rationalizing the entire tax structure, anti-smuggling and anti-corruption campaigns, a livestock census for taxation purposes, the first budget (in 1922), implementing the metric system (which did not take hold), establishing the Bank-i-Melli (National Bank) in 1928, and introducing the Afghani as the new unit of currency in 1923. The political and judicial reforms Amānullāh proposed were equally radical for the time and included the creation of Afghanistan's first constitution (in 1923), the guarantee of civil rights (first by decree and later constitutionally), national registration and identity cards for the citizenry, the establishment of a legislative assembly, a court system to enforce new secular penal, civil and commercial codes, prohibition of blood money, and abolition of subsidies and privileges for tribal chiefs and the royal family.

Although sharia (Islamic law) was to be the residual source of law, it regained prominence after the Khost rebellion of 1924–25. Religious leaders, who had gained influence under Habibullah Khan, were unhappy with Amānullāh's extensive religious reforms. Conventional wisdom holds that the tribal revolt that overthrew Amanullah grew out of opposition to his reform program, although those people most affected by his reforms were urban dwellers not universally opposed to his policies, rather than the tribes. Nevertheless, the king had managed to alienate religious leaders and army members.

== Foreign involvement ==
=== British Empire ===
According to a later British ambassador in Afghanistan, William Kerr Fraser-Tytler, the British Empire, though officially neutral, was very concerned about the situation in Afghanistan and they "made up a set of rules to govern the situation. It was unneutral to refuse an Afghan entry into Afghanistan, but once he was in he became a contestant, and it would be unneutral to allow him to recross the border, seeking a brief asylum before plunging again into the fray. And so in a mixture of the rules of cricket and football it was ordained that a player might go on the field once, and play for the crown. But if he was forced into touch, and recrossed the line, whether voluntarily or not, he was 'out' and the referee would not let him back into the game."

Numerous commentators, in Afghanistan and elsewhere, claimed that British intelligence played a part in the fall of Amanullah; a theory which was prominent amongst Soviet historiography. According to Encyclopædia Iranica,

While it can not be dismissed out of hand, the fact remains that no evidence to support it can be found in the copious British Indian archives pertaining to this period. There can be no doubt, however, that behind the stance of official neutrality which the British maintained throughout the crisis of 1929 lay an unwillingness to help Amān-Allāh to reconquer his throne and a benevolence toward the moves of Nāder Khan. While the Soviet authorities favored Amān-Allāh (though reluctantly) and aided a foray on his behalf by Ḡolām Nabī Čarḵī in the Balḵ region, the British authorities allowed Nāder Khan to reenter Afghanistan through India and to obtain a decisive addition of strength through his recruitment of thousands of armed Wazīr and Masʿūd frontier tribesmen. Also helpful was their decision to lift a restriction order, imposing residence at a fixed address in India, on Fażl ʿOmar Mojaddedī, who was to play an apparently decisive role in persuading the Naqšbandī mollās of Afghanistan to change sides and later was to become Nāder Shah's first minister of justice. In short, while all the evidence indicates that Bačča-ye Saqqā [Kalakani]'s rise was due solely to the internal disintegration of King Amān-Allāh's régime, there can be no doubt that British policy, tacit rather than explicit, helped to bring about Bačča-ye Saqqā's fall".

=== Soviet Union ===
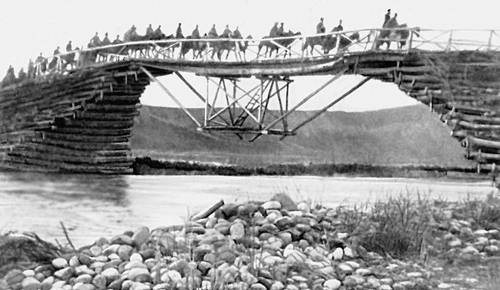
Red army troops in Afghanistan.

After coming to power in Afghanistan, the Saqqawists allowed Basmachi insurgents to operate in northern Afghanistan, who then had established themselves in parts of Kunduz, Takhar and Badakshshan provinces by March 1929. Repeated Basmachi incursions into Soviet territory eventually prompted the start of a Soviet operation in Afghanistan.

=== Iran ===
The Iranian military attache, Colonel Ali Khan, was under instruction by Reza Shah to protect the Shiite community of Afghanistan to the greatest possible extent that would not invite a Saqqawist attack on Iran.

=== Germany ===
While Germany itself was uninvolved in the war, the Afghan-German Trading Company was requested by Kalakani to assassinate Amanullah Khan on 15 April 1929, and were promised a large reward if they did so. However, this assassination never materialized. Ultimately, DACOM was forced out of business due to economic difficulties relating to the 1928-1929 Afghan civil war.

== Course of the war ==
=== War begins (November – December 1928) ===
==== Shinwari revolt ====
The unraveling began when Shinwari Pashtun tribesmen revolted and besieged Jalalabad on 14 November 1928, cutting telegraph wires and cutting the road to the capital, after which they drew a manifesto of ten grievances, five of which related to what they saw as Amanullah's unsupportable meddling with the status of women. However, during the Shinwari rebellion two years later, the Shinwari claimed that this revolt was "not so much anti-Amanullah as against the local tax-collectors at Jelalabad". The initial response of the government was to send a small contingent to relieve Jalalabad, which was halted at Nimla, 20 miles (32 km) west of Jalalabad, before that force found itself surrounded and destroyed shortly after. Thereafter, Amanullah sent two representatives to suppress the uprising – his foreign minister, Ghulam Siddiq Khan, and the head of the National Council, Shayr Ahmad Khan. However, In late November, they had a falling out, and according to Fayz Muhammad, were negotiating separately with the tribes. Ghulam Siddiq is said to have incited some of the Shinwari to attack Shayr Ahmad Khan, the main consequence of which was that the Shinwari burned the Emir's winter palace in Jalalabad to the ground.

On 3 December 1928, Amanullah then decided to send his brother-in-law, Ali Ahmad Khan Luynab, to deal with the problem, and sent him off with regular troops, militia levies, and a sizable treasury with which to conciliate the tribal leaders. Ghulam Siddiq and Shayr Ahmad were ordered back to Kabul.

In the meantime, calls had gone out for tribal levies to assist the regular army in dealing with the Shinwari uprising, and armed tribesmen from the east, south and west, which included Waziri, Wardak, Ghilzai and Tajik tribesmen, but also more recently the Mangal tribesmen (who recently were at war with Amanullah's government) trickled into the capital to help. These men had no particular loyalty to the government and saw the situation simply as an opportunity for enrichment. As it turned out, there was no need to send them to Jalalabad, Ali Ahmad managed to conciliate the Shinwari leaders and put an end to the uprising, but as it took a while for this news to spread through the countryside, the levy tribesmen continued to arrive in the capital.

==== Siege of Jabal al-Siraj ====
Amanullah presumably welcomed the news of the reconciliation. However, any feeling of relief would have been very temporary – forces led by a Tajik leader, Habibullah Kalakani, were moving toward Kabul from the north. Kalakani was a native of Kalakan, a village thirty kilometers north of Kabul. In late November, they besieged Jabal al-Siraj, north of Kabul, and on either 11 or 12 December, after 18 days of siege, Ahmad Ali Lodi peacefully surrendered the citadel, handing over all government funds as well as 18 machine guns, and an unspecified number of heavy weapons and rifles.

==== First Battle of Kabul ====
First Battle of Kabul
Date	14–25 December 1928
Location	Kabul, Afghanistan
Result	Kalakani forces retreated to Murad Beg Fort

Belligerents
Amānullāh Khān forces	Saqqawists

Commanders and leaders
Amānullāh Khān	Habibullāh Kalakāni (WIA)

Strength
Unknown	2,000 men

Emboldened by the victory, Kalakani attacked Kabul with 2000 men (only 200 of which were armed with rifles, and the rest armed with sticks and axes) on 14 December 1928. He and his forces entered the Murad Beg Fort on the northern slopes of the Kuh-i Kutal, nearby the village of Khayr Khanah. The rebels, feeling that deposing an emir would be against the shariah, performed a ritual and declared Kalakani the new emir, and then passed through the village of Dih-i Kupak at 3:00 PM. Around 3:15 PM, they reached the Bagh-i Bala park. They also occupied Bagh-i Bala palace, formerly the summer residence of Abdur Rahman Khan, which had now been turned into a military hospital for the Emir's personal guard and the residence of a Turkish physician, Bahjet Beg. After disarming and dismissing the guards and the embassy, they stationed their own guards, reassuring the employees of the embassy that they were guests of the nation and as such no harm would come to them.

The rebels also managed to enter the house and fortress tower of Shahr Ara, which was defended by Shawkat Beg, a Turkish officer who was the son of Muhammad Akbar Khan. His small force, as well as a group of cavalry officers, managed to prevent the Rebels from entering the old city.

As the battle continued, the whole city was filled the sounds of artillery and gunfire. However, only the cavalry of the Emir's personal guard and a few other loyal soldiers actually put up a fight against Kalakani's forces. The rest of the army was in a mutinous mood, as their officers had been appropriating the soldier's rations. Holding their commanders rather than the rebels to blame for the trouble, when ordered to shoot, the soldiers simply fired their weapons in the air. Tumult and confusion were now widespread. The emir was furious when he heard of the mutiny, and ordered all the weapons to be distributed to the residents of Kabul and to the tribesmen who had come into the city but had not yet left for Jalalabad to fight the Shinwari. However, the near-universal loathing of the Afghans for Amanullah led to the majority of them refusing to take up arms against Kalakani. To make matters worse for Amanullah, Some Waziri, Mangal and Ahmadzai tribesmen defected to Kalakani, took up positions on the Asmai Hill in the center of Kabul, and fired on the Emir's troops.

Ghulam Ghaws, Whose father, Malik Jahandad Ahmadzai, had been executed following a rebellion, headed towards his hometown costs, carrying with him more than 300 rifles, armed the people there, and rose up against the government. Other tribes acted similarly because there was no control over the distribution of weapons.

The battle took a drastic turn on 25 December, when Kalakani was wounded in the shoulder from an aerial bomb, causing him to retreat 20 kilometers north, to Murad Beg Fort, in the Kuhdaman region.

=== Fall of Amanullah's government (January 1929) ===
==== Siege of Murad Beg Fort ====
Kalakani's retreat gave Amanullah a chance to regroup. In late December, he began shelling Murad Beg Fort, and this shelling lasted until 13 January. However, the shelling failed to provide any results, and this disheartened the king. In the early morning of 14 January, Amanullah abdicated the throne to his oldest brother, Inayatullah Khan, who ruled for only three days before escaping into exile in British-India. Amanullah's efforts to recover power by leading a small, ill-equipped force toward Kabul failed. The deposed king crossed the border into British-India and went into exile in Italy and remained in Europe until his 1960 death in Zürich, Switzerland. At the time of his abdication, Amanullah's troops were fighting in the Khayr Khanah (Khirskhanah) pass, seven miles (11 km) north of Kabul.

==== Second Battle of Kabul ====
Fall of Kabul
- Date: 17 January 1929; 97 years ago
- Location: Kabul, Afghanistan
- Outcome: Saqqawists captured Kabul: Inayatullah Khan abdicated and later fled from Kabul after surrendering to Kalakāni.; Habibullāh Kalakāni de facto succeeded Inayatullah Khan as the King of Afghanistan.; Beginning of the Saqqawists period in Afghanistan.

After ascending to the Afghan throne, Inayatullah Khan sent a peace envoy to Kalakani. The envoy informed Kalakani that Inayatullah's accession had been illegal in accordance to the shariah, since Kalakani had ascended the throne in the Islamic month of Rajab, and Inayatullah's accession had taken place in the Islamic month of Sha'ban. Rejoiced, Kalakani and 28 armed men, accompanied by a group of unarmed Kuhdamanis passed through the village of Dih-i Afghanan and attacked the capital, shouting "ya chahar yar" slogans and firing guns at the air. On the very first day of his reign, Inayatullah was forced to barricade himself in the Arg with several of his ministers.

On the 16th of January, while 80 Hazaras from Bihsud were defending the Qalah-i Buland Fortress, as well as the arsenal at Kulula Pasha, some officials declared their allegiance to Kalakani. These included Shayr Ahmad, head of the national council, Fayz Muhammad Khan, former minister of trade, Abd al-Hadi Khan, the minister of finance, and the sons of Abdur Rahman Khan: Mir Hashim, Sardar Amin Allah Khan, Muhammad Umar Khan, as well as a number of deputy ministers and heads of state bureaus.

On the 17th of January, Inayatullah, unnerved by the lack of support from the Kabulis, surrendered to Kalakani and abdicated the throne. Kalakani allowed him to peacefully leave Kabul with his family and 3000 rupees.

My brother, Habib Allah! It is known to all that i have no wish to be padishah. After the death of my father, I never harbored any desire for the throne. I was compelled to accept it only at the insistence of the leaders who linked my accession to the throne with the prosperity of the people and the strengthening of Islam. But now, as I see the blood of Muslims being shed, I have decided to relinquish my claim to the Afghan Emirate and give you my oath of allegiance like other true-believing Muslims.

— Inayatullah Khan, "Kabul Under Siege" (1999) pg 45

=== Kalakani rules Kabul, Saqqawist offensives (February – August 1929) ===
Having become King of Afghanistan, Kalakani appointed a number of people into office, including:

- Shayr Jan, former cavalry commander, as Minister of Court.
- Ata al-Haqq as foreign minister.
- Abd al-Ghafur Khan, son of Muhammad Shah Tarabi of the Safi tribe, as Minister of the interior.
- Malik Muhsin as governor-general of the Central Province.
- Sayyid Husayn as Minister of Defense.
- Purdil Khan as field marshal of the Army.
- Abd al-Wakil Khan as field marshal of the Army alongside Purdil Khan.
- Hamid Allah as "honorary sardar".
- Sayyid Muhammad as commander of the Arg.
- Mirza Mujtaba Khan as minister of finance.
- Muhammad Mahfuz (Afghan) Mahfuz as war minister.
- Kaka Muhsin of the Kacharlu clan as governor of Hazarahjat (centered on Bihsud).
- Muhammad Karim Khan (governor of Ghazni) Karim Khan as governor of Ghazni.
- Khwajah Mir Alam as governor of Mazar-i-Sharif.
- Ghulam Muhammad Khan of governor of Tagab.
- Chighil Khan as governor of Charikar.
- Nadir Ali as governor of Jaghuri and Malistan.

On 9 May, Kalakani passed a decree in Kabul which forbade citizens of Kabul from moving out of the city without permission, even into the government-controlled Bandar-i Arghandah, Charasya, Bini Hisar, Butkhak, Kutal-i Pay Manar, Kutal-i Khayr Khanah, Maydan, Jalriz, Logar, Khurd Kabul, Tangi Gharu or Dih Sabz.

On 31 May, Kalakani paid a visit to the shrine at Mazar-i Khwajah Musafir, which lies near the village of Chihil Tan above the village of Shaykh Muhammad Riza-yi Khurasani which lies in the Paghman District, 6 miles (9.7 km) west of Kabul

==== Kalakani versus Ali Ahmad Khan ====
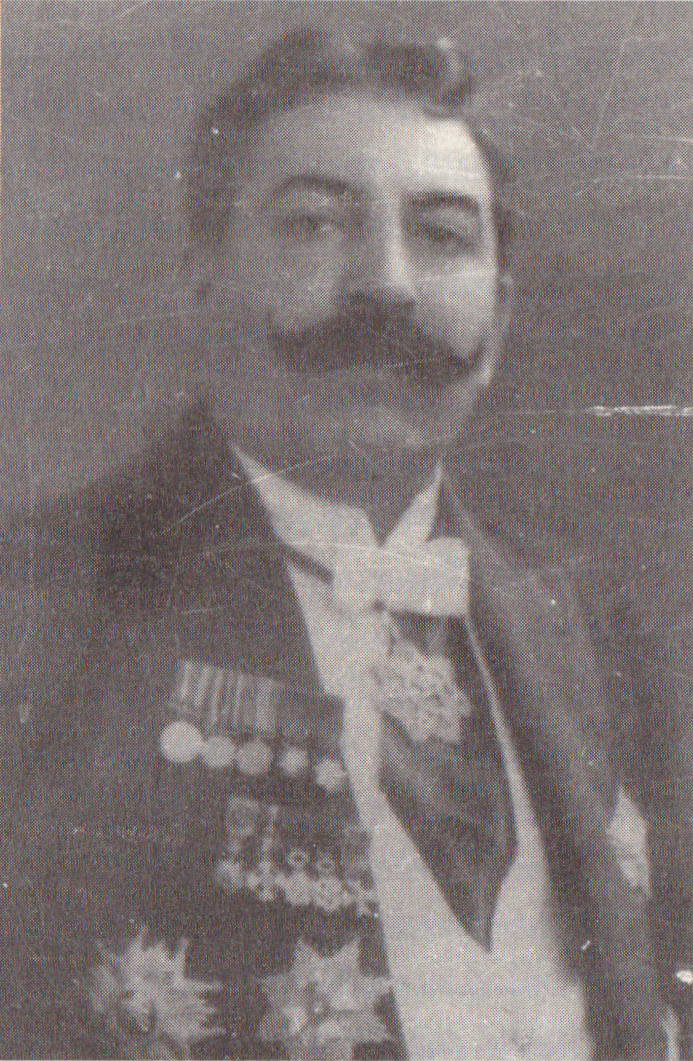
Ali Ahmad Khan

Following his takeover, Kalakani, fearful of a counterattack by the Amanullah loyalists, swiftly moved the treasury to Kudhaman.

The first concerted opposition to Kalakani came from Ali Ahmad Khan, who was still stationed in Jalalabad after suppressing the Shinwari revolt. There, the locals proclaimed Ali as the new Emir upon receiving the news of Kalakani's accession. Ali then marched his troops on Samucha-i Mulla Omar, Tangi Khurd Kabul, and Chanri, and took up positions there. At the head of a 2,000 men strong army and a tribal militia, he marched to Jagdalak, where he waited for a force of Mohmands who had promised to join him. Over the course of 23 to 29 January, Ali sent out proclamations of his new emirate to Kabul, Logar, the Hazarahjat, the Southern province, and elsewhere, and called on people to join him.

Malik Qays of the Khugyani tribe, who had initially allied himself with Ali, defected to Kalakani, captured Ali and brought Ali to Kalakani in exchange for 17,000 rupees and the rank of lieutenant general, ending Ali's reign on 9 February.

==== Kalakani versus anti-Saqqawist tribes ====
Sometime before 13 March, the Battle of Shaykhabad took place, 46 miles (74 km) from Kabul and halfway across the Kabul-Ghazni road.

It was here where Karim Khan Wardak, who refused to pledge allegiance to Kalakani, had made defensive preparations. Around this time, Abd al-Wakil Khan, who had earlier been appointed field marshal by Kalakani, was dispatched to Ghazni and Qandahar with a force of 3,000 men. When Abd al-Wakil reached the village of Bini Badam and Qalah-i Durrani, 30 miles (48 kilometres) from Kabul, he halted there to deal with Karim Khan Wardak's forces, only then to proceed. But Karim Khan, along with Wazir and Hazara leaders who had gathered in support of Aman Allah, sent a joint message to the field marshal that said:

We, the peoples of the region of Wardak, consider ourselves subjects of Amir Habib Allah. However, since we have yet to send him our oaths of allegiance, we fear that if his army should come it might be to attack us and plunder our property. But if he shows forgiveness and agrees to these four conditions, we will not stand in the way of your victorious army. Our conditions are the following:

- First: the fortress of Abd al-Ahad Khan who left for Qandahar with Amir Aman Allah must be protected against looting and his people from punishment.
- Second: The rifles distributed to us by Amir Aman Allah must be left in our possession.
- Third: All of us, the people of Wardak, living on the territory up to Ghazni, must not be subject to looting nor violence even though we have not yet sent oaths of allegiance.
- Fourth: When your army passes through our territory during its two day march, all forage and provisions must be procured for cash and market prices and not taken without payment or in the form of a requisition.

Once your army has passed through, we promise to go to Kabul and offer our oath of allegiance to the Amir with sincere hearts.

— Karim Khan Wardak, message to Abd al-Wakil

Abd al-Wakil accepted this message at face value, and he sent the Model Battalion, which at the time numbered 1,800 men and was stationed at Qal ah-yi Durrani, to march on Shaykhabad along with 400 royal cavalry and 800 Kuhistani and Kuhdamani infantry militia which had halted near the village of Bini Badam. After an exhausting march through snow-covered hills, Abd al-Wakil's forces were ambushed near Zarani, at the edge of the Daht-i Tup waste land by Wardak tribesmen, who came thundering down the hills after a soldier's shot at a bird alerted them that Kalakani's troops were nearby. Many of Abd al-Wakil's troops were killed in the ambush; only 20 of 400 cavalrymen survived.

The people of Maydan, Jalriz and Sanglakh refused to offer allegiance to Kalakani, and formed an alliance with the Wardak and surrounded Kalakani's armies in Maydan, and defeated them in Qalah-i Durrani, before advancing to Arghandah, 14 miles (23 kilometres) west of Kabul, where some Kalakani's forced decided to retreat toward Qalah-i Qazi, Chardihi and Kuhdaman.

On 5:30 on 22 March, Kalakani personally headed from Kabul to Arghandah to bolster the spirits of his soldiers and managed to convince the soldiers to advance on Kutal-i Shaykh, a small village near the intersection with the road west to the Unay Pass. They accepted, and the battle of Kutal-i Shaykh lasted until the evening with a victory for Kalakani.

In the morning of 23 March, Kalakani ordered 500 militiamen to be brought back to Kabul from Najrab, because they had been fighting against the Tagabis and Kalakani was worried that Najrab might defect. On 24 March, Kalakani ordered some Kuhdamanis, Kuhistanis, and people from the villages of Dih-i Nur, Maydan and Arghandah to cover the army rear which was then at Qalah-i Durrani and Pul-i Maydan and so deny those awaiting its defeat the chance to march on Chardihi and Kuhdaman. Later that same day, Kalakani's Field Marshall, Purdil Khan (who had since been named as Minister of Defense) shelled Maydan, which strengthened the resolve among the Maydan, Arghandah and Sanglakjh to fight Kalakani. On the 25th, Purdil Khan managed to capture Maydan, but the great casualties inflicted prevented him from advancing towards Wardak and Ghazni, and he withdrew to Arghandah and Qalah (Note: American historian Robert D. McChesney believes that Qalah may be identified as Qalah-i Qazi.) the following day.

===== Kalakani versus the returned Amanullah =====
At this time, Amanullah had supposedly returned to Afghanistan and was marching from Qandahar with an army made of Durrani, Khattak, Ghilzai, and Hazara fighters. Four days after entering Afghanistan, Amanullah learnt of a Saqqawist uprising in Herat. On 27 March, Habibullah Kalakani ordered his brother, Hamid Allah Kalakani, to lead a force of Panjshiris backed by 14 siege guns, to Maydan. At Kutal-i Shaykh, this force won a major victory which allowed it to continue advancing towards Maydan, where it took 25 prisoners and destroyed several forts. On the night of the 28th, anti-Saqqawist tribesmen ambushed Hamid Allah's force, and while they were able to deal vast casualties and capture many field guns and rifles, they were unable to dislodge Hamid from his position. On the 30th, the anti-Saqqawist tribes renewed the battle, and this time they managed to almost completely expel Hamid Allah's forces from Maydan, except for a few detachments which were surrounded in the fortress known as Qalah-i Abd al-Ghani Khan Beg Samandi, about 14 miles (23 km) west of Shaykhabad. A large part of Hamid's defeated army retreated to Arghandah and Qalah-i Qazi.

On the 31st, Kalakani started another offensive on Maydan and made some progress. On 2 April, a force from Bihsuf occupied the Unay Pass and reached an agreement with the militias of the Surkh-i Parsa, Turkman, Bamyan, Balkhab and Shaykh Ali Hazarah for them to attack Kuhistan and Kuhdaman via the Ghurband Valley road while it simultaneously attacks Kabul via the road through Maydan. On 3 April, Kalakani's forces clashed in Shash Gaw, 13 miles (21 km) north of Ghazni. On 7 April they were defeated while advancing along the road not so far from Ghazni near Shiniz in Wardak. On 7 April, they clashed at Shiniz, and on the 9th they clashed in Shaykhabad and Jaghatu, northwest of Ghazni. Fayz Muhammed reports that Kalakani suffered a major defeat near Ghazni on 9 April and that his forces fled to Qalah-i Durrani, but historian Robert D. McChesney believes this to be false. By the 12th, there were rumours in Kabul that Ghazni was surrounded by anti-Saqqawist forces. In mid-March, Mohammed Nadir Shah, who had departed from France in January, arrived in Jalalabad to centralize the opposition to Kalakani. It was reported on 16 April that Ghazni had fallen to anti-Saqqawist forces, and that Kalakani's forces had been defeated at Shaykh Amir, near the Majid Pass. By the 20th, there were reports that anti-Saqqawist forces were on the doorstep of Paghman, just west of Kabul, and that Hazarah forces from Bihsud crossed the Unay pass and were heading on their way to Ghurband, while another force occupied positions there to prevent Kalakani from using it to cross to Hazarahjat. The force sent to Ghazni retreated to Shiniz-i Wardak. On the 21st, soldiers loyal to Kalakani left Kabul to reinforce Ghazni. At this time, Kalakani decided to reinforce the Qalah-i Durrani fort to prevent rebel tribes from advancing past it. On the 24th, Kalakani's forces were clashing in Shash Gaw, 13 miles (21 km) northwest of Ghazni. On the 26th, while laying siege to Ghazni, Amanullah had inexplicably given the order to retreat to Qandahar. On the 28th, it was reported that Kalakani's army had captured Ghazni. On 30 April, anti-Saqqawist forces re-entered Ghazni, renewing the battle. The same day, a large anti-Saqqawist offensive managed to dislodge Kalakani's forces from positions in Shaykhabad, Takiya and Shash Gaw, forcing some of them to retreat towards Daht-i Tup. On 1 May, anti-Saqqawist forces continued their offensive, clashing in Dasht-i Tup and Shaykhabad, and on 2 May fighting was taking place in Shaykhabad, Dasht-i Tup and Qalah-yi Durrani. On 7 May, units were sent from Kabul to Mahtab and Arghandah to prepare defenses there. On 8 May, while there was fighting in Dasht-i Tup and Bini Badam, Saqqawist forces under Purdil Khan departed for Charikar. One of Kalakani's generals, Muhammad Unar Khan, died on 14 May. The next day, Kalakani sent units to Kuh-i Asmai and Shayr Darwazah. On the 19th, Amanullah was rumoured to be besieged at Kalat, 80 miles (130 km) north of Qandahar. On the 23rd, Amanullah Khan fled Afghanistan into the British Raj, leaving his brother Inayatullah Khan in charge of anti-Saqqawist resistance. By that time, Kalakani held control of the entire Ghazni region, and the road south of Ghazni as open. By 1 June, anti-Saqqawist forces who at this time were at Qarabagh decided to retreat Qandahar, while Kalakani's armies were able to take Kalat and had surrounded the city of Qandahar, which duly fell on 3 June or 31 May.

===== Kalakani versus Nadir =====
On 8 March, Nadir Khan crossed into Afghanistan just east of Matun in the Kurram Valley. On 16 March, Kalakani dispatched troops in two directions: along the route to Maydan through Qalah-i Mahtab Bagh, Qalah-i Durrani, Qalah-i Qazi, and Arghandah, and via Charasya and Musai to Logar. 129 troops were also dispatched by Kalakani to the Logar Valley, which were defeated at Waghjan Gorge (Between Kushi in Kulangar and Shikar Qalah), forcing them to retreat to Rishkhur, south of Kabul. On 23 March, heavy fighting was occurring in Najrab, north of Kabul. The next day, 500 of Kalakani's troops who were marching from Charasya to Kulangar were ambushed, with many killed or wounded.
By 31 March, there were some reversals for Kalakani on the Maydan front. On 23 March, 6000 Mangal tribesmen joined Nadir Khan at Khost. Four days later, he left for Urgun, which he reached on 5 April. A few days later, he took Baladah, and on the 15th he captured Gardez. On the 23rd, Nadir was residing in Safid Qalah, at the southern entrance of the Altamur (or Tirah) pass. On the 24th, he continued through the pass to Charkh, where he was confronted by a force sent by Kalakani. After initial success in capturing the village of Dabar in Charkh, he was ultimately forced to retreat to Sijinak, east of Gardiz on the 27th. On the 22nd, Kalakani sent troops to Logar to defend it against Nadir, whose forces captured Dubandi and the village of Kushi that same day. On the 23rd there were rumours in Kabul that Kalakani's armies had been defeated and forced to retreat to Qalah-i Durrani on the Maydan-Ghazni road. On the 23rd, Nadir reached the Waghjan Gorge. On the 24th, there were rumours in Kabul that Nadir's forces had entered the village of Aghujan, 22 miles (35 km) south of Kabul. On the 25th, Nadir reached Hisarak in the Logar valley, and on that same day it was rumoured that he had suffered a defeat in a battle at Tirah Pass. On 1 May, while a battle in the Southern province had been going on for three days, Kalakani's forces carried out a raid on Khushi in Logar and plundered its inhabitants. By 3 May, Nadir had established a fort at Surkhab and was harassing Kalakani's troops to prevent Kalakani from advancing into the Southern province. On the sixth, Kalakani sent new troops to Charikar. On the 11th there were rumours that Nadir arrived in Charkh in Logar. Robert D. McChesney believes this to be false, and says this was just wishful thinking. On 8 May, Hashim (Nadir Khan's brother) persuaded tribes of the Eastern province to unite against Kalakani, who agreed to raise 40,000 troops who would advance in three formations through Tagab, Tangi Gharu, Ghakari and Lataband to attack Kuhdaman, Kuhistan and Kabul. That same day, Nadir's forces reached the region of Pul-i Hashim Khayl in Gandamak and at Tagab made plans to continue further down the road. On 11 May pro-Nadir tribes moved on Kabul but were stopped by Saqqawist Shinwari at Surkhrud. On 12 May there were rumours that Nadir had inflicted a defeat upon Kalakani at Bidak. On 15 May Nadir crossed the Tirah Pass and began an incursion into the Logar valley, which continued the 16th, when Nadir pursued the local Saqqawist forces as far as Kulangar, Kutti Khayl and Muhammad Aghah, and was fighting over control of the Ghurband Valley. Also on the 16th, Nadir reached Khak-i Jabbar via the road through Hisarak. On the 23rd, when peace negotiations were ongoing, Kalakani sent a force of 300 men to Logar. On 26 June, Kalakani's forces recaptured Gardiz.

On 14 July, Nadir Khan's forces entered the Logar valley, won a victory at Padkhwab-i Rughani and from there, advanced on Surkhab where they surrounded and besieged one of Kalakani's forces at Kariz-i Darwish, which surrendered the next day. On 18 July, Kalakani's forces fought a battle with the Khugyani near Khurd Kabul. In order to get the upper hand in the battle, Kalakani confiscated all automobiles and horse carriages in Kabul, so that reinforcements could arrive more quickly. This plan worked, and on 19 July the situation was stabilized. On 18 August, Nadir moved his headquarters to Ali Khayl with the Jaji tribe, which had assured him of their unswerving loyalty.

===== The Tagab Front =====
Sometime before 17 March, anti-Saqqawist tribes from Tagab launched a surprise attack on Sarubi and Gugamandan, opening what Robert D. McChesney labels "The Tagab Front". This attack took the local garrisons by surprise and allowed the Tagabis to capture two cannons, weaponry and other military supplies. After this success, the Tagabis planned a northward assault on Jamal Afgha in Kuhistan, which was successfully undertaken on the 18th. On 23 March, people of Durnama, Sujnan and Bulaghin attacked the Tagabis, defeated them, and occupied their positions, which stabilized the Tagab Front. On 1 April, prisoners arrived from Tagab.

On 2 August, the Tagab front was re-opened following a local uprising. On 12 August, after days of skirmishes, Kalakani's forces launched a large counteroffensive and forced the Tagabis to surrender the next day. This ended the Tagab front.

===== The Ghurband Front =====
On 2 April, there were rumours in Kabul that anti-Saqqawist Hazaras had occupied positions in Balkh, while others were able to march on Aqchah, Andkhuy, Maymanah and Mazar-i Sharif. On the 7th, anti-Saqqawist forces arrived in Siyahgird in Ghurband. On the 17th, Sayyid Hussayn had left for Charikar. anti-Saqqawist forces closed the road in the Ghurband valley leading to Kuhistan and Kuhdaman, and on the 18th they had reportedly reached Ghurband. On the 19th, a counteroffensive by Ghulam Rasul Khan against the Hazaras was called off by Kalakani, who wanted instead to focus on Charikar, which was reportedly under attack by local anti-Saqqawist partisans. On the 20th, Sayyid Husayn left for Charikar, where he ambushed and killed Ata Muhammed, whose fiancée Sayyid had taken as a wife in the years prior, for which Ata Muhammed had sworn to kill him. On the 26th, word spread in Kabul that Hazara units had reached Katan mountain, west of Shakar Dara, and from there captured the Khudamani villages of Shakar Darra, Farza, Ghaza, Saray Khwajah, and Charikar. On the 27th, anti-Saqqawist Hazaras reportedly attacked Farza, Shakar Darra and Istalif (towns in Kuhdaman). That same day, in response to Hazara advances, Kalakani sent Hamid Allah on a counteroffensive which succeeded forcing the Hazaras to pull back. However, the situation remained dire for Kalakani and on 3 May he withdrew troops and munitions from other fronts to reinforce the Ghurband front. On 4 May, on the same day which Amanullah withdrew from Wardak, there were rumours in Kabul that Sayyid Husayn, one of Kalakani's generals, had made a breakthrough in Ghurband, and on the next day he reportedly was marching on Mazar-i Sharif via the road through Qunduz. Before this march on Mazar-i Sharif, the city had earlier been the site of a mutiny by Kuhistani and Kuhdamani forces, which began in January after Kalakani captured Kabul, and was ended on 30 April by anti-Saqqawist forces. It's after this point that sources disagree – Faiz Mohammad records the mutineers of Mazar-i Sharif retreating to Herat and capturing it sometime before 15 May, while Ademec says that Herat was captured sometime after Saqqawist forces captured Mazar-i Sharif in June, after Amanullah left Afghanistan for the British Raj, and then gradually extended their control to Maymanah and then Herat.

On 10 May, word had spread in Kabul that Ghulam Jalani Khan had occupied Andarab and Khanabad in Qataghan and the governor of Qataghan-Badakhshan Province, Mir Baba Sahib Charikari had been killed. On 9 or 10 May, Sayyid Husayn suffered a severe setback in the Battle of Shibar Pass, where his 12,000-man strong army was routed by a local Hazara militia which sought revenge for destruction of cattle, which ended Sayyid's hopes of taking Mazar-i Sharif. On May 12, Sayyid found himself besieged in Kuhistan and was reportedly wounded. On that same day, one of Kalakani's generals, Abd Al-Wakil Khan captured Fayzabad in Badakhshan while some of his units reached Farjaghan (at the head of the Alishang Valley near Tagab and Najrab). Also on 12 May anti-Saqqawist forces won a victory in a battle near Pul-i Matak after marching on Tagab. On 13 May 900 men from Kalakani's army were captured in Ghurband after a brief battle. On the 14th, another 2000 Saqqawist soldiers were defeated and their weapons, materiel and ammunition was seized.

On the 15th, Sayyid Husayn began another offensive against anti-Saqqawist forces, but after taking the Pansjir Valley on the 15th he was stopped at the Khawak Pass on the 16th. On the 19th, there were rumours in Kabul that Sayyid Husayn had died and that anti-Saqqawist forces had marched on Charikar, which Robert D. McChesney believes to be either highly exaggerated or completely false. On the 26th, Sayyid Husayn returned to Kabul alive and well, dispelling rumours about his death, and by the beginning of June, the routes via the Ghurband Valley and the Salang and Khawak Passes were firmly in the hands of Kalakani. On 29 May, 2300 men were sent north to reinforce the Ghurband front. On 31 May, Kalakani's army, which had advanced as far as Bamyan en route to Mazar-i Sharif had been routed and forced to retreat to Jabal al-Siraj. On 11 April, Nadir arrived in Khushi in the Logar valley. On 20 April, the son of Abd Allah Khan Tukhi, whose brother, Ata Muhammad, had raised a rebellion in Mazar-i Sharif against Kalakani, was hanged in Kabul. On 7 May 12,000 anti-Saqqawist forces occupied the Unay Pass and the Safidkhak Pass, while others were positioned on the lower slopes of the Paghman and Shakar Darrah. At this time, various anti-Saqqawist tribes planned a coordinated assault on Kabul. However, ethnic differences and poor communications led the attack to never materialize. On 2 June, Kalakani sent troops to Sar-i Chashmah, where they were ordered not to fire on anyone who swears allegiance as long as they were unarmed. On 23 May, Amanullah left Afghanistan for a last time, never to return. That same day, Kalakani sent 6500 men to conquer the Hazarahjat. Sometime before 19 June, Kalakani's forces won a victory at Bamyan, where they at first found themselves encircled, before the commander of the besieging Hazara forces was bribed to retreat. As of 23 June, anti-Saqqawist forces continued to occupy the Unay pass. As of 27 June, anti-Saqqawist forces had advanced two miles (3.2 km) from the Unay Pass towards Sar-i Chashmah. On 28 June, Kalakani's forces fought an offensive battle against Hazara militias at Qalah-i Karim. After capturing the village and burning it to the ground, they were ambushed by Hazaras who were subsequently driven off with artillery fire and forced to retreat into the mountains. After this victory, Kalakani's forces took control of the Unay Pass. On 29 June, Kalakani's forces advanced on Qalah-i Yurt. On 30 June, Kalakani's forces advanced toward Qalah-i Yurt after getting as far as Jawqul. On 1 July, Kalakani's forces looted homes in Takana, Jalriz and Kuhnah Khumar. On 2 July, Kalakani's forces suffered a defeat at Jawqul and were forced to retreat to Sar-i Chashmah, and then to Chandawul through Bazar-i Sar-i Chawk, Baghban Kuchan and Chandawul. On 3 July, Hamid Allah renewed the offensive, but was beaten back after being surrounded by Hazara militias, and was then pursued on his retreat as far as Sar-i Chashmah. As of 8 July, the Hazaras continued to fight Kalakani's forces and attacked a 5,000-man regiment, forcing them to retreat to Jalriz. However, the Hazarahs did not follow up this victory with an attack on Kabul – Robert D. McChesney points out that politics in Afghanistan tend to be extremely local, and once the Hazarahs secured control of their own regions, they had little interest in fighting for more territory.

On 10 July, Umar Khan promised to Kalakani that he would take upon himself the task of either forcing the Hazara's submission or crushing them. Faiz Mohammad quotes him as saying "Purdil Khan has taken Ghazni and captured Qandahar; Major General Muhammad Siddiq and Abd al-Qayyum Ibrahim Khayl Paghmani have advanced toward the Southern Province; and Muhammad Umar General Sur-i Satranj has defeated the opposition in numerous battles. I don't want to lose ground to my peers here. I should be able to make short work of the Hazarahs and extract their submission." He set off for Jalriz and linked up with soldiers who had been recently been skirmishing with Hazaras, won a victory at Sar-i Chasmah and conducted operations as far as Takana. However, success soon stalled, and after being wounded in the leg, Umar was forced to retreat, leaving the Hazaras to re-occupy all lost territory.

On 17 July, Hazara militias attacked Saqqawist forces in the Unay Pass and Qalah-i Safid, routing them and pursuing them to Takana and Jalriz. From 25 to 29 July, fighting took place in Jalriz, however on 30 July the Hazaras withdrew from Jalriz back to the Hazarahjat after they heard that Nadir suffered setbacks in the eastern province, which, for the time being, ended the Hazara's hopes of joining Nadir in a multi-pronged offensive toward Kabul. On 1 August the Hazaras began another offensive, attacking Qalah-i Majid (near Siyah Baghal) and Qalah-i Safid, a fort in the Unay Pass, chasing Kalakani's forces as far as Jalriz once again. On 3 August, Kalakani's forces were reportedly defeated at Jalriz once again. On 15 August, Hazara militias launched an offensive against Turkmen tribes who had pledged allegiance to Kalakani on 31 July, occupying positions in Darrah-i Suf, Kuh-i Shadyan and Marmal, and besieged fort Dih Dadi (a garrison village midway between the site of ancient balkh and Mazar-i Sharif).

=== Saqqawist collapse, end of the Civil War (August – October 1929) ===
Final offensives of the Afghan Civil War
Date	18 August – 13 October 1929
Location	Afghanistan
Result	Pro-Nadir and Anti-Saqqawists forces victory: End of the Saqqawists period

Belligerents
Anti-Saqqawists; Pro-Nadir forces	Emirate of Afghanistan (Saqqawists)

Commanders and leaders
Mohammed Nadir Shah	Habibullāh Kalakāni

On 18 August, an anti-Saqqawist uprising took place in Bamyan, Ghuri and Baghlan, blocking Kalakani's force's route to Turkistan and forcing them to retreat to Ghurband. On 21 August, the Sayyid of Shaykh Ali launched an offensive against Kalakani, advancing as far as Khanabad, Andarab and Ghurband. On 26 August, there were rumours in Kabul that Hazara settlers successfully attacked Mazar-i Sharif. In early September, the Saqqawists won their last victory by taking Jalalabad. On 23 September, a pro-Nadir uprising in Kandahar succeeded at driving out Kalakani's forces from the city. On 29 September, a pro-Nadir force under Shah Wali crossed the Durand Line and occupied Khushi. On the 30th, he sent a 1000-man force ahead to Tangi Waghjan, the gorge on the road to the Logar Valley. On 3 October, after an intense battle, anti-Saqqawist forces captured the town of Muhammad Aghah, placing themselves within striking distance of Kabul.

Kalakani himself took part in this battle, trying to lift his soldier's spirits, to no avail. anti-Saqqawist forces continued to slowly push towards Kabul, seizing Charasya, Chihil Tan and Chihil Sutun on 5 October. By 7 October, Kalakani's forces had retreated from almost all territory outside Kabul, and prepared for their last stand. On 9 October, after dozens of hours of street fighting in Kabul, the Arg was put under siege. On 13 October, after several days of bombardment, Nadir's forces entered the Arg, and after a short but fierce battle, captured it, ending the civil war. Upon hearing this news, a small contingent of Kalakani's army which was besieged at Jabal al-Siraj resolved to surrender that same day.

== Aftermath ==
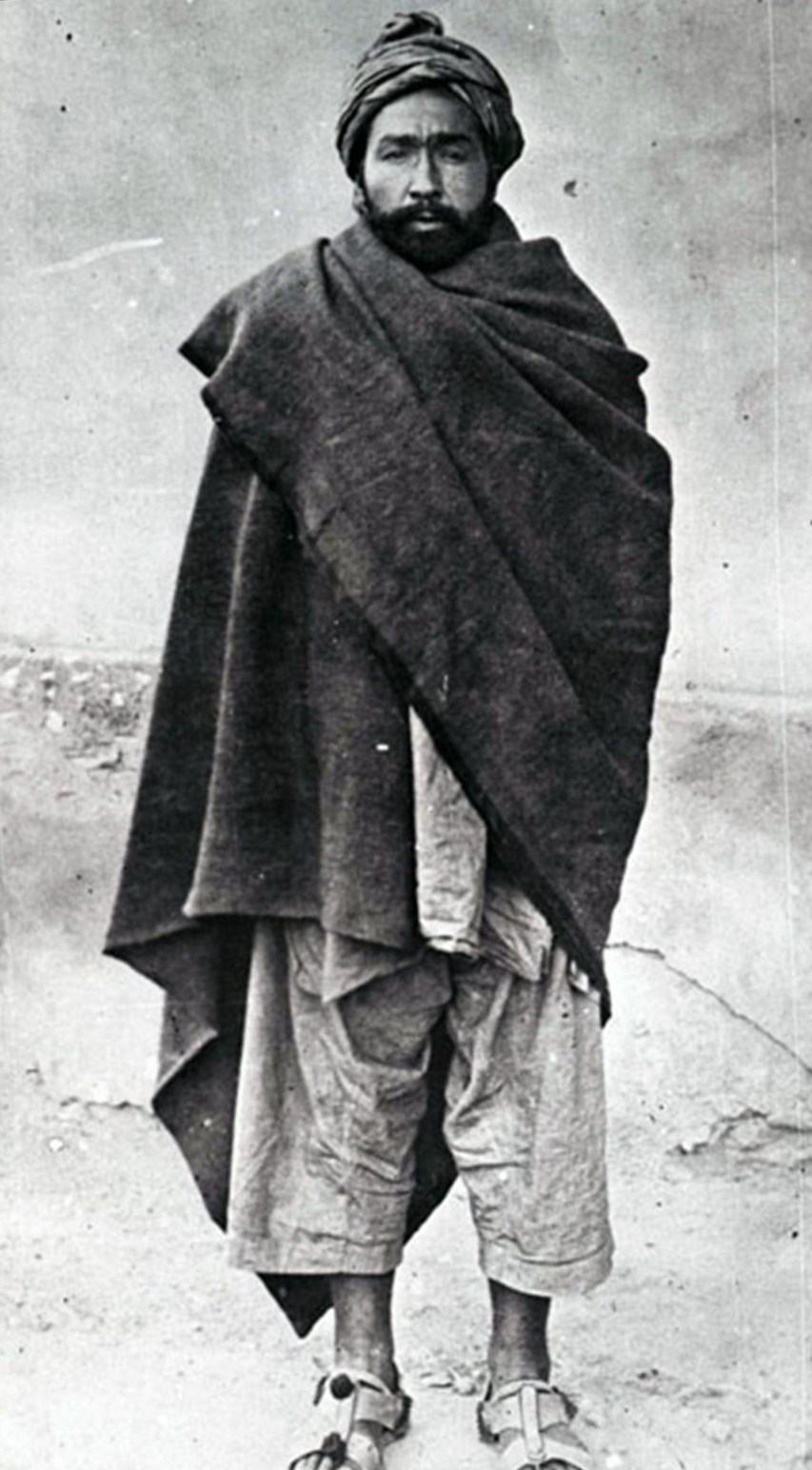
Habibullah Kalakani, popularly known in Afghanistan as Bacha-i Saqqao, shown as a prisoner before being executed in November 1929.

On 15 October, Mohammed Nadir Shah arrived in Kabul after hearing word of Kalakani's defeat. On the 16th, Nadir entered the Dilkusha Palace, expressing his gratitude to those who had backed him. He acknowledged Amanullah Khan’s contributions to the country and, citing his own poor health, made it clear that he had no personal ambition for the throne. Instead, he pledged to support whoever the national Jerga (tribal council) selected as the next ruler. However, the assembled tribal leaders were adamant that Nader himself should take the crown. Raising their rifles, they warned that if he refused, they would abandon Kabul. Faced with their unwavering insistence, Nader Khan ultimately accepted the responsibility and became the king of Afghanistan.

Nadir considered pardoning Kalakani, but pressure from loyal tribes led him to execute Kalakani on 1 November 1929. Kalakani, his brother, and 9 others were lined up against the west wall of the Arg and shot. During the reign of Nadir, the Saqqawists attempted another uprising, the Kuhistan rebellion (July 1930), which was crushed within a week. Saqqawist activity continued until 1931, when Nadir led a campaign to conquer their final holdout, Herat.

As king, Nadir realized that his earlier opposition to Amanullah's reforms had been vindicated by the civil war. Instead of reinstating the reforms that Kalakani had repealed, Nadir worked to complete the abolition of Amanullah's reforms, strengthening the power of tribal leaders and clerics.

Pro-Amanullah factions in Afghanistan felt betrayed by Nadir's assumption of power, having fought the Saqqawists under the presumption that Amanullah would retake the throne upon their victory. Nadir's strengthening of Anglo-Afghan ties (which included support for British sovereignty over Pashtuns east of the Durand line, and lack of support for the Afridi Redshirt Rebellion) was also a sore point for Afghanistan's Amanites. Hafizullah Emadi (2010) describes the Amanullah loyalists as nationalist and progressive forces. They led several rebellions: The first of these, the Shinwari rebellion and the Kuhistan rebellion (February–April 1930), occurred in 1930. In 1938, there was also the Ghilzai rebellion.

In the 1940s, Mohammed Zahir Shah faced several tribal revolts, and the leader of the Zadran revolt, Mazrak Zadran, sought to restore Amanullah. During World War II, western press reported that Amanullah Khan was working as an agent for Nazi Germany in Berlin. It is believed he was involved in plans to regain his throne with Axis help.

According to Resort to war: a data guide to inter-state, extra-state, intra-state, and non-state wars, 1816–2007, both sides suffered 7500 combat deaths during the civil war.

== Human rights abuses ==
=== By the Saqqawists ===
During the Afghan Civil War, there were incidents of rape and looting among Saqqawist troops. One such incident took place on 28 June 1929, when Saqqawists attacked the Hazara settlement of Qalah-i Karim, looting anything movable and driving off livestock. Another incident, which took place on 23 July 1929, was described by contemporary Afghan historian Fayz Muhammad as follows:

Today, the Shiite sayyid Abu'l-Qasim, who had a house and plot of land in Takanah, prepared loaves of bread made from one and a half Kabuli seers of flour, a skin of fresh buttermilk, some oil, and a roasted sheep he had slaughtered at midday. He set off with the food to offer it to Habib Allah and his bandits who were hungry and thirsty. When the sayyid approached the leader of the thieves, he was asked who he was and where he came from. A Sunni Tajik from Jalriz, blinded by a savage, fanatical hatred for all Shiites, said he was a Shiite sayyid as well as a partisan who the night before had given shelter in his fort to a Hazarah, the son of Shah Nur. When he heard this, Habib Allah was enraged. Without thinking, he fired seven shots from his pistol into the sayyid although what he should have done was thank him for the desperately needed bread, meat, oil and buttermilk he had brought. Habib Allah then ordered his home burned to the ground and his belongings confiscated. He handed his two wives and his betrothed daughter over to the Kuhdamanis. Hamid Allah, the tyrant's younger brother, came running from the battlefield to participate in torching the fort, ransacking the sayyid's belongings, and seizing his wives and children. Tearing an eight-month old son from its mother, he grabbed the baby by the feet and threw him to the ground with all his might, killing the infant. The Tajiks of Jalriz and Takanah dragged off everything from the sayyid's house. Since he had been quite well off, each Tajik made off with a substantial amount.

— Fayz Muhammad

=== By the anti-Saqqawists ===
Following the anti-Saqqawist capture of Kabul in October 1929, Kabul was sacked by Nadir's forces. Some sources state that this sacking had been authorized by Nadir, but this is contested by historian Vartan Gregorian.

By all evidence, there is no justification for such an assertion (and that evidence includes the testimony of Andrée Viollis, the only foreign correspondent in Kabul at the time). It appears rather than the plundering took place during the five days preceding Nadir's entry into the city, and that it was not officially condoned. Indeed, Nadir had issued a manifesto specifically ordering the tribesmen, under penalty of death, to respect the lives and property of foreigners. His orders were simply ignored.

— Vartan Gregorian

== See also ==
- European influence in Afghanistan
- Western imperialism in Asia
- Red Army intervention in Afghanistan (1929)
- Red Army intervention in Afghanistan (1930)
- Afghan Civil War (1989-1992)
