= Ali Ahmad Khan =

- King of Afghanistan
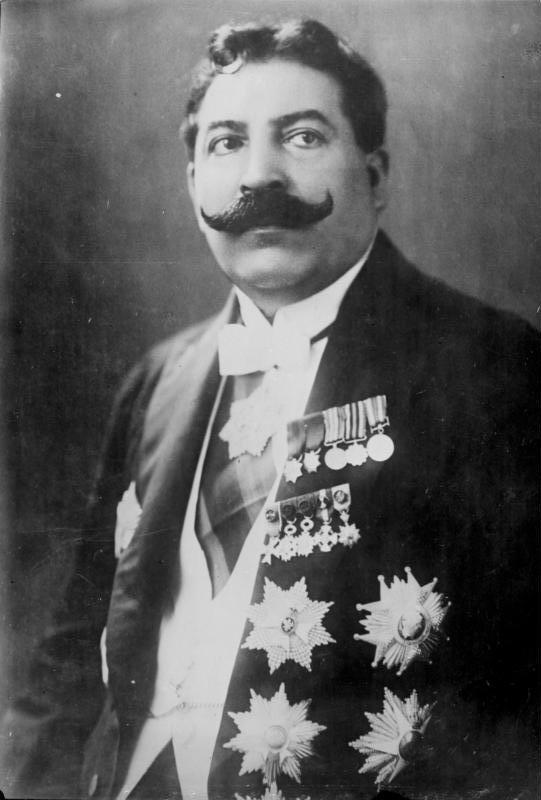
- Official portrait, c. 1929

Emir of Afghanistan
- 1st reign: 17 January 1929 – 9 February 1929
- Predecessor: Inayatullah Khan
- Successor: Habibullah Kalakani
- 2nd reign: 23 June 1929 – 3 July 1929
- Predecessor: Habibullah Kalakani
- Successor: Habibullah Kalakani
- Born: 1883; Mashhad, Sublime State of Persia
- Died: 11 July 1929 (aged 45–46); Kabul, Emirate of Afghanistan
- Spouse: Princess Sahira Begum of Afghanistan
Names
- Emir Ali Ahmad Khan Shaghasi
- Father: Loinab Khush Dil Khan, Governor of Kabul and Kandahar
- Mother: Sahira Begum
- Religion: Islam

Flag used by Ali Ahmad Khan during his rebellion against Kalakani.

Amir Ali Ahmad Khan, Shaghasi (Pashto: (Note: Pashto pronunciation: [ʔa.li ʔɑ.mad̪ xɑn, ʔa.li ʔah.mad̪ xɑn]) علي احمد خان; Persian: (Note: Persian pronunciation: [ʔä.líː ʔɑː.mád̪ xɑːn, ʔä.líː ʔäɦ.mád̪ xɑːn]) علی احمد خان, 1883–11 July 1929) was an Afghan king from the Shaghasi family of the Barakzai tribe who was declared king of Afghanistan twice in 1929. He was first declared amir of Afghanistan by an influential cleric, Naqib Sahib on 20 January 1929, in eastern Afghanistan, but was defeated by Kalakani at Jagdalak on 19 February 1929. He was also declared as the amir of Afghanistan for the second time on 23 June 1929 in Kandahar, Afghanistan, by another highly influential Mufti Abd. Wasi Kandahari, but was defeated and captured by Kalakani on 3 July 1929.

Khan was born in 1883 in Mashhad, Persia. He was the son of Loinab Khushdil Khan and grandson of Loinab Shirdil Khan Shaghasi. Ali Ahmad Khan was educated in Murree (British India) and served as the Chamberlain Isk Aqasi (Shaghasi), of Amir Habibullah Khan. Ali Ahmad Shaghasi played a leading role in negotiating the controversial Anglo-Afghan Treaty of 1919 during the reign of his brother-in-law Amanullah Khan, which ended the Third Anglo-Afghan War and gained Afghanistan its independence. Ali Ahmad Khan Shaghasi later rallied the Khogyani and Shinwari to quell the Khost rebellion, for which he was honoured with the honorary tile of Taj-i-Afghan by King Amanullah. Sometime Minister for Home Affairs 1919-1920 and Governor of Kabul 1925–1929, Ali Ahmad also served as high commissioner of the Eastern and Southern provinces.

During the Afghan civil war of 1928–29, Ali was ordered to quell a Shinwari revolt, which he duly ended in December 1928. Later, after Inayatullah Khan was forced to surrender control of Kabul and Arg to Habibullah Kalakani on 18 January 1929, and Ali was declared as a lawful Amir of Afghanistan by Naqib Sahib in Jalalabad. However, Ali's reign would prove short-lived: Malik Qays of the Khugyani tribe, who had initially allied himself with Ali, brought Ali to Kalakani in exchange for 17,000 rupees and the rank of lieutenant general, ending Ali's reign on 9 February. Ali later managed to make his way to Amanullah Khan in Kandahar to assist the former king's forces against Kalakani, but was defeated and captured and sent to Kabul along with Abd al-Shakur Khan (The Chief Justice), Sad al-Din Khan (Abd al-Shakur Khan's son), and Mufti Abd al-Wasi, where he remained imprisoned in Kabul for over a month. Ali Ahmad defiantly kissed the cannon by which he was executed on 11 July 1929. Other historical Afghan literature mentions that when Kalakani ordered him to be tied on his back to a cannon for his execution, Ali Ahmad turned around and instead hugged the cannon face on in defiance, then called for it to be fired.

== Ancestry ==
Ancestors of Ali Ahmad Khan

4. Loinab Sher Dil Khan Shaghasi, Governor of Balkh
2. Loinab Khush Dil Khan Ghazi, Governor of Kabul and Kandahar
1. Loinab Ali Ahmad Khan Shaghasi
24. Haji Jamal Khan
12. Sardar Payinda Muhammad Khan
25. a Ghilzai lady
6. Sardar Dost Mohammad Khan
26. Musa Khan Jawansher Qizilbash
13. Zainab Begum
3. Sahira Begum
14. Sardar Agha Muhammad Khan Qizilbash
7. a daughter of Sardar Agha Muhammad Khan Qizilbash

Amir Ali Ahmad Khan Shaghasi was son of General H.E. Loinab Khushdil Khan, sometime Governor of Kabul and Kandahar, by his wife Sahira Begum, daughter of H.H. Amir al-Mumenin, Amir al-Kabir, Amir Dost Muhammad Khan, Amir of Afghanistan, by his wife, a daughter of Agha Muhammad Qizilbash. Ali Ahmad's sister, the Ulya Mukhadara Zarin Jan Begum was the mother of Humaira Begum who was the Queen consort of Afghanistan. Amir Ali Ahmad Khan's grand father, Loinab Shir Dil Khan Shaghasi was a regional Sardar from the reign of Amir Dost Muhammad Khan, especially during 1863 - 1866 and 1868 - 1879, the reign of H.H. Amir al-Mumenin, Amir Sher 'Ali Khan, Amir of Afghanistan, and was related to the Shaghasi royal family of the Barakzai dynasty.

== Notes ==
Ali Ahmad Khan Born: 1883 Died: 1929
Regnal titles
Preceded by Inayatullah Khan	King of Afghanistan; 1929	Succeeded by Habibullah Kalakani
