= Robert D. McChesney =

Robert Duncan McChesney (born May 10, 1944) is a scholar of the social and cultural history of Central Asia, Iran, and Afghanistan.

== Academic career ==
Robert D. McChesney was born in Northampton, Massachusetts) and received his B.A. in 1967 and his PhD in 1973 from Princeton University.

McChesney’s academic focus has been on the history Central Asia, Iran and Afghanistan from the time of the Mongol conquest through the early 20th century. Much of his work has centered on the connection of social history and architecture and the Islamic charitable institutions that supported architecture. He has taken a particular interest in the works of Afghan scholar Fayz Muhammad, in particular his monumental history of Afghanistan, Sirajul Tawarikh. McChesney has also written a translation of Fayz Muhammad's account of the 1929 Afghan Civil War. He has made frequent contributions to Encyclopædia Iranica. McChesney is held in high regard by his peers for his meticulous use of primary sources and fluency in several languages.

He retired in 2007 as a professor of Middle Eastern Studies and History at the Department of Middle Eastern and Islamic Studies at New York University.

McChesney is also the director of the Afghanistan Digital Library, a project to create an online library of rare books from Afghanistan. The project began in response to the destruction and looting of many library collections and private book collections during the several decades of war in Afghanistan in recent decades.

== Works by Robert D. McChesney ==
Note: Works have been published under the names Robert D. McChesney, R. D. McChesney, and R. McChesney.

- "'Abd-al-Mo'men b. 'Abdallāh." Encyclopædia Iranica.
- "'Abd-al-Qoddus b. Boltan Mohammād." Encyclopædia Iranica.
- "'Abd-al-Rahmān b. Soyunj." Encyclopædia Iranica
- "Abu'l-Hasan b. Mohammad Amin Golestāna." Encyclopædia Iranica .
- "'Alāmārā-Ye Šāh Esmā 'Īl." Encyclopædia Iranica.
- "Architecture and Narrative: The Khwaja Abu Nasr Shrine." Muqarnas, vol. 18 (2001) (Part One: Constructing the Complex and Its Meaning, 1469–1696) and vol. 19 (2002) (Part Two: Representing the Complex in Word and Image, 1696-1998).
- "Badī'-al-Zamān Mīirzā." Encyclopædia Iranica .
- "Bark Ardār Torkmān." Encyclopædia Iranica.
- "Bokārī Ākund Mollā Mohammad-Šarīf." Encyclopædia Iranica.
- "Barrier of heterodoxy?" Rethinking the Ties Between Iran and Central Asia in the 17th century" in Pembroke Papers 4 (1996), 231-67.
- "Central Asia: Economy from the Timurids until the 12th/18th century," Encyclopædia Iranica.

, 1992.

- Central Asia: Foundations of Change. Princeton&New Jersey: The Darwin Press, 1996.
- "Central Asia in the 16th_18th centuries" Encyclopædia Iranica.

, 1992.

- Charity and Philanthropy in Islam: Institutionalizing the Call to Do Good. (Indianapolis: Indian University Press, 1995)
- "Corās. Šāh-Mahamud b Mīrza Fāzel." Encyclopædia Iranica.
- "Economic and Social Aspects of the Public Architecture of Bukhara in the 1560s and 1570s," Islamic Art, v. 2, 1987.
- Written by Fayz Muhammad. Translated by R.D. McChesney. Kabul Under Siege: Fayz Muhammad's Account of the 1929 Uprising. (Princeton: Markus Wiener Publishers, 1999.)
- Fayẓ Muḥammad Kātib Hazārah’s Sirāj al-tawārīkh, The History of Afghanistan. Edited and translated by R.D. McChesney and M.M. Khorrami. Brill, 2016. 11 volumes.
- "Fayz Mohammad Kateb." Written with A. H. Tarzi. Encyclopædia Iranica.
- "Four Sources on Shah Abbas's Building of Isfahan," Muqarnas, v. 5, 1988.
- "Mohammad-Ayyub Khan." Encyclopædia Iranica, 2003.
- "Reconstructing Balkh: The Vakfiya of 947/1540." Studies on Central Asian History, ed. Devin DeWeese (Bloomington 2001).
- Waqf in Central Asia: Four Hundred Years in the History of a Muslim Shrine, 1480-1889. (Princeton:Princeton University, 1991.)
- "Waqf and public policy: the waqfs of Shāh 'Abbās 1011-23/1602-14" Asian and African Studies v. 15, no. 2, (July 1981), 165-90
- "Zamzam Water on a White Felt Carpet: Adapting Mongol Ways in Muslim Central Asia, 1550-1650," in Michael Gervers and Wayne Schlepp, eds., Religion, Customary Law, and Nomadic Technology (Toronto, 2000).
