= Saqqawists =

1920s and 1930s armed group in Afghanistan

- سقاوی‌ها
- Flag of Afghanistan under Habibullāh Kalakāni
- Leaders: Habibullah Kalakani; (1924 – 13 October 1929); Purdil Khan; (July 1930)
- Dates active: 1924–1931
- Allegiance: Emirate of Afghanistan (1929)
- Group: Tajiks (majority)
- Headquarters: Surobi (mid-1920s); Kabul (17 January – 13 October 1929); Herat (until 1931)
- Ideology: Islamic fundamentalism Islamism; Anti-Shi'ism
- Size: 24 (1924); 20,000 (14 April 1929)
- Wars: 1924–1928 low-level insurgency; Afghan Civil War (1928–1929); Kuhistan rebellion (July 1930); Battle of Herat (1931)

The Saqqawists (Note: Persian: سقاوی‌ها, romanized: Saqāwī-hā) were an armed group in Afghanistan who were active from 1924 to 1931. They were led by Habibullāh Kalakāni, and in January 1929, they managed to take control of Kabul, the capital of the Kingdom of Afghanistan, re-establishing the Emirate of Afghanistan. Following military reversals in the Afghan Civil War (1928–1929), they were forced out of the capital in October 1929. Saqqawist activity ended in 1931.

== Name ==
The name derives from Kalakani's nickname, Bacha-e Saqaw (Persian: بچه سقاو; literally son of the water carrier). Due to the existence of multiple Persian romanization schemes, authors have rendered the name of this group in multiple ways, with alternative renderings including "Saqaoists" and "Saqawi".

The period in which Kalakani ruled Kabul, 17 January to 13 October 1929, is known as the "Saqqawist period".

== History ==
An animated map of the Afghan Civil War of 1928–1929. Red = Saqqawists, Blue = Anti-Saqqawists. This map does not show the concurrent Soviet intervention against the Basmachi in northern Afghanistan.

Habibullāh Kalakāni began resistance against the government of Amanullah Khan in 1924, after he deserted from the Royal Afghan Army, which at the time was fighting against the Khost rebellion. Kalakani began a life of banditry, since he considered the occupations common among the Kuhdamanis, like viticulture and selling firewood, to be beneath him, reasoning that these could hardly ever provide wheat bread for his table. Instead, he began to rob caravans and nearby villages. He was joined by Sayyid Husayn and Malik Muhsin, as well as others, totaling 24 in all. For three years, they lived in mountain caves, venturing out during the day to rob and hiding out at night, all the time fearful of government retaliation. Sometime later, Kalakani fled to Peshawar where he was a tea seller and a petty thief.

In November 1928, while a Shinwari revolt was occurring in Jalalabad, the Saqqawists besieged Jabal al-Siraj, beginning the Afghan Civil War. On 17 January, they took Kabul, beginning what is known as the "Saqqawist period". In October 1929, a series of intense battles succeeded at forcing Kalakani to retreat into Kabul, and subsequently into the Arg. On 13 October 1929, the Arg was captured by forces loyal to Mohammad Nādir Khān, ending the Saqqawist period. During the subsequent reign of Nadir, the Saqqawists attempted another uprising, the Kuhistan rebellion, which was crushed within a week. The last Saqqawist holdout, Herat, fell to the Afghan government in 1931.

== Membership and support ==
The Saqqawists saw widespread support among Afghanistan's Tajik population. The Saqqawist attack on Kabul in January 1929 was supported by the religious establishment as a way to reverse Amanullah's reforms. However, Habibullāh Kalakāni "did not have the caliber to serve as the head of the state" and lost conservative support once in power. On 14 April 1929, Fayz Muhammad estimated the Saqqawists to number 20,000.

== Ideology ==
Kalakani declared himself to be a "defender of Islam", denouncing opponents as kuffar. The Saqqawists also had some support amongst Islamists.

== International relations ==
Despite taking control of Kabul, the Saqqawist government of Afghanistan was unable to obtain any diplomatic recognition. Nonetheless, the Saqqawists allied themselves with the Basmachi movement, allowing them to operate in Northern Afghanistan, and revoking the "Pact of Neutrality and Non-Aggression" that Afghanistan had signed with the Soviet Union following the end of the Urtatagai conflict, which obligated Afghanistan to restrain Basmachi border raids.

== Human rights abuses ==
During the Afghan Civil War, there were incidents of rape and looting among Saqqawist troops. One such incident took place on 28 June 1929, when Saqqawists attacked the Hazara settlement of Qalah-i Karim, looted anything movable and drove off livestock. Another incident, which took place on 23 July 1929, was described by the contemporary Afghan historian Fayz Muhammad as follows:

Today, the Shiite sayyid Abu'l-Qasim, who had a house and plot of land in Takanah, prepared loaves of bread made from one and a half Kabuli seers of flour, a skin of fresh buttermilk, some oil, and a roasted sheep he had slaughtered at midday. He set off with the food to offer it to Habib Allah and his bandits who were hungry and thirsty. When the sayyid approached the leader of the thieves, he was asked who he was and where he came from. A Sunni Tajik from Jalriz, blinded by a savage, fanatical hatred for all Shiites, said he was a Shiite sayyid as well as a partisan who the night before had given shelter in his fort to a Hazarah, the son of Shah Nur. When he heard this, Habib Allah was enraged. Without thinking, he fired seven shots from his pistol into the sayyid although what he should have done was thank him for the desperately needed bread, meat, oil and buttermilk he had brought. Habib Allah then ordered his home burned to the ground and his belongings confiscated. He handed his two wives and his betrothed daughter over to the Kuhdamanis. Hamid Allah, the tyrant's younger brother, came running from the battlefield to participate in torching the fort, ransacking the sayyid's belongings, and seizing his wives and children. Tearing an eight-month old son from its mother, he grabbed the baby by the feet and threw him to the ground with all his might, killing the infant. The Tajiks of Jalriz and Takanah dragged off everything from the sayyid's house. Since he had been quite well off, each Tajik made off with a substantial amount.

— Fayz Muhammad

== Historiography ==
A significant amount of the information regarding Habibullah Kalakani and the Saqqawists is derived from the works of Afghan historian Faiz Muhammad Kateb, whose reliability as a source has been subject to inquiry. His portrayal of the Afghan Civil War has been subject to various criticisms, as Kateb was closely associated with the Musahiban royal family in many facets. This association extends to rulers such as Abdur Rahman Khan, Habibullah Khan, and Amanullah Khan. Given these close ties with the monarchy, his portrayal of events has been viewed by some as potentially biased in favor of the royal family and their campaigns.

Kateb was known for favoring royal figures as being one of their head writers had led him to coddle and paint reputable images of certain figures. For instance, Nasrullah Khan is recorded to have sent specific letters to Kateb with directions to publish and circulate favorable accounts of his activities in England, in order to enhance his reputation and honor. Another criticism is that Kateb was connected with the Young Afghan Movement led by Mahmud Tarzi. The publications created by Tarzi and his circle were often seen by critics as idealistic and nationalistic. They were also noted as promoting Afghan nationalism in a manner that was sometimes considered exaggerated, imposing, or propagandistic to certain minorities. Tarzi was also a recognized opponent of Kalakani and the Saqqawists' agenda due to having established several progressive journals. Tarzi also played a significant role in shaping the royal family's foreign affairs during that period; the royal family were themselves persistent opponents of the Saqqawists.

Another concern revolves around the treatment of Kateb’s writings by the royal family. Kateb’s historical works were subject to tampering and censorship by royal officials, and even the monarch himself. One instance is that, while compiling Tohfat ul-Habib (Habib's Gift), a history of Afghanistan under Habibullah Khan, the king rejected the original manuscript and ordered Kateb to rewrite it. Similarly, Amanullah Khan, upon evaluating Kateb's subsequent works, ordered that all existing copies be burned.
