= Habibullah Kalakani =

Self-proclaimed ruler of Afghanistan in 1929 (1891–1929)

- King of Afghanistan; Emir of Afghanistan
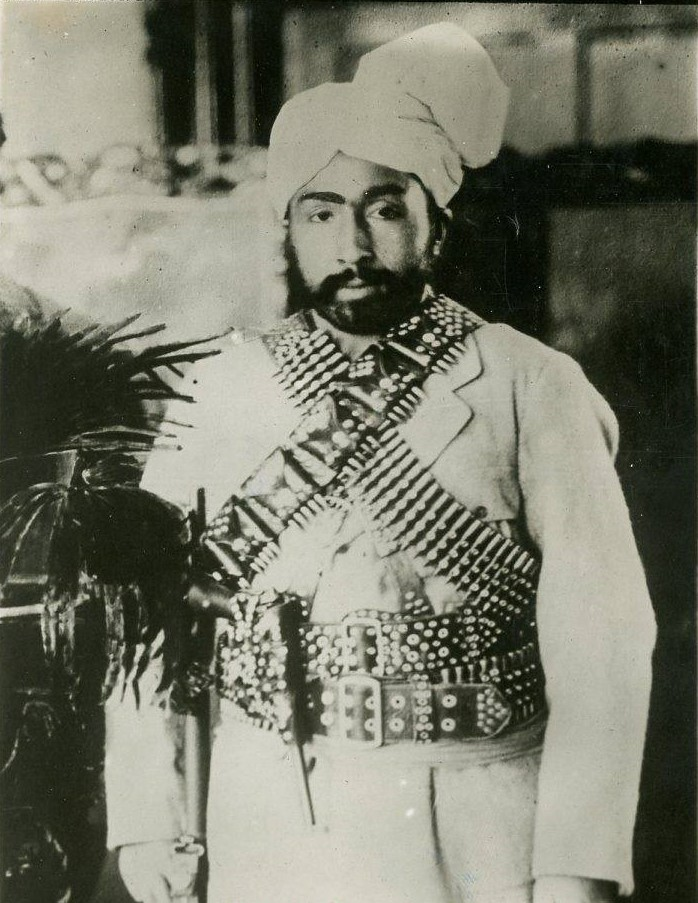
- Portrait of Habibullah Kalakani, 1929

Emir of Afghanistan
- Reign: 17 January 1929 (Note: Most sources list 17 January 1929, the day that Kalakani captured Kabul, as the date that his reign began. However, he had been formally claiming the title of emir since 14 December 1928.) – 13 October 1929
- Coronation: 14 December 1928 and again on 18 January 1929
- Predecessor: Inayatullah Khan
- Successor: Mohammad Nadir Shah
- Born: 19 January 1891; Kalakan, Emirate of Afghanistan
- Died: 1 November 1929 (aged 38); Kabul, Kingdom of Afghanistan
- Father: Aminullah Kalakani
- Religion: Islam
- Military career
- Conflicts: Third Anglo-Afghan War; Khost rebellion (1924–1925): Afghan Civil War (1928–1929); Siege of Jabal al-Siraj; First Battle of Kabul (WIA); Siege of Murad Beg Fort; Battle of Shaykhabad; Battle of Moqor; Battle of Shaykhabad; Battle of Unai Pass; Tagab Front; Ghurband Front; Siege of Kabul (executed)

Habibullah Kalakani (Note: Pashto: حبيب‌الله کلکانی, romanized: Habib Allāh Kalakāni [(h)a.bi.bu(l).lɑ(h) ka.la.kɑ.ni]; Persian: حبیب‌الله کلکانی, romanized: Habīb Allāh Kalakānī [(h)ä.bíːb‿ʊl.lɑ́ː(ʱ) kʰä.lä.kʰɑː.níː]) (born Habibullah Khan; 19 January 1891 – 1 November 1929), titularly known as Habibullah Khan III, and derogatively known as "Bacha-yi Saqaw", (Note: also Romanized as "Bachai Sakao", lit. 'Son of the Water Carrier'; Persian: بچه سقاو, romanized: Bacha-yi Saqqāw) was the Emir of Afghanistan from 17 January to 13 October 1929, and the former leader of the Saqqawists. During the Afghan Civil War (1928–1929), he captured vast swathes of Afghanistan and ruled Kabul during what is known in Afghan historiography as the "Saqqawist period". No country recognized Kalakani as ruler of Afghanistan.

During the 1928–1929 Afghan Civil War, he contested the Afghan throne with King Amanullah Khan. After defeating Amanullah, he was eventually defeated by Mohammad Nadir Shah. Khalilullah Khalili, a noted historian and Kohistani poet laureate, depicted King Habibullah Kalakani as the "best manager of governmental imports and exports".

== Early years ==
Habibullah Kalakani was born 19 January 1891 in the village of Kalakan, north of Kabul. He was an ethnic Tajik. His father was a water carrier for Afghan soldiers in Kabul during the Second Anglo-Afghan War. In his memoirs, Kalakani stated that his home village was "miserable" and that he had "conceived a deep hatred of its poverty-stricken exterior". At age 14, he left for Kabul on horseback with his friends Nur and Jamal. (Note: This statement is based on My Life: From Brigand to King, which purports to be an autobiography of Kalakāni. However, various scholars, such as Leon Poullada and Nazif Shahrani do not consider this autobiography genuine. According to the book's foreword, the text is a translation by a “Persian-knowing scholar” of the original notes of a surviving companion of Habibullah Kalakani, one Jamal Gul, who had supposedly been with him since childhood and was now “roaming about in Europe as a Man of no Country.” The translator remains anonymous (he claims he did not want to “uselessly intrude and confuse the essential story” but admits that he introduced “some Latin phrases here and there . . . for the accommodation of difficult Oriental expressions into more familiar European terminology”). The book, however, is fully English in style and "reads like a thrilling adventure story rather than an autobiography.") Later, he joined King Amanullah Khan's army, and fought in the Third Anglo-Afghan War and the Khost rebellion of 1924. During the latter war, he served as officer with the Afghan Army's "Model Battalion" and served with distinction during the suppression of the insurgents. Nevertheless, he deserted the unit at some unspecified time, and after working in Peshawar moved to Parachinar where he was arrested and sentenced to eleven months of imprisonment by the British. (Note: "Other sources have him arrested in Peshawar in January 1928, then sentenced to three years' imprisonment because he was unable to post bond. But this information seems problematic since by August 1928, he was in Paghman, just west of Kabul, and soon after in Kuhdaman where we pick up Fayz Muhammad's account of him." —Robert D. McChesney in Kabul Under Siege : Fayz Muhammad's Account of the 1929 Uprising)

== Revolt ==
An animated map of the Afghan Civil War of 1928–1929. Red = Saqqawists, Blue = Anti-Saqqawists. This map does not show the concurrent Soviet war against the Basmachi in northern Afghanistan.

While the Afghan Army was engulfed in battle with Pashtun outlaw tribes in Laghman and Nangarhar provinces in the east of the country, the Saqqawists, led by Kalakani began to attack the unprotected Kabul from the north in 1928. The revolt caught steam and the country was thrown into a civil war. Wild tribesmen from Waziristan had the southern areas of Kabul surrounded, and Kalakāni's forces were moving into the heart of Kabul from the north.

In the middle of the night, on 14 January 1929, Amanullah Khan handed over his kingdom to his brother Inayatullah Khan and escaped from Kabul, with his vehicle, towards Kandahar in the south, fearing people's wrath. Two days later, on 16 January 1929, Kalakani wrote a letter to King Inayatullah Khan to either surrender or prepare to fight. Inayatullah Khan responded by explaining that he never wished to become king, and agreed to abdicate.

== Kingship ==
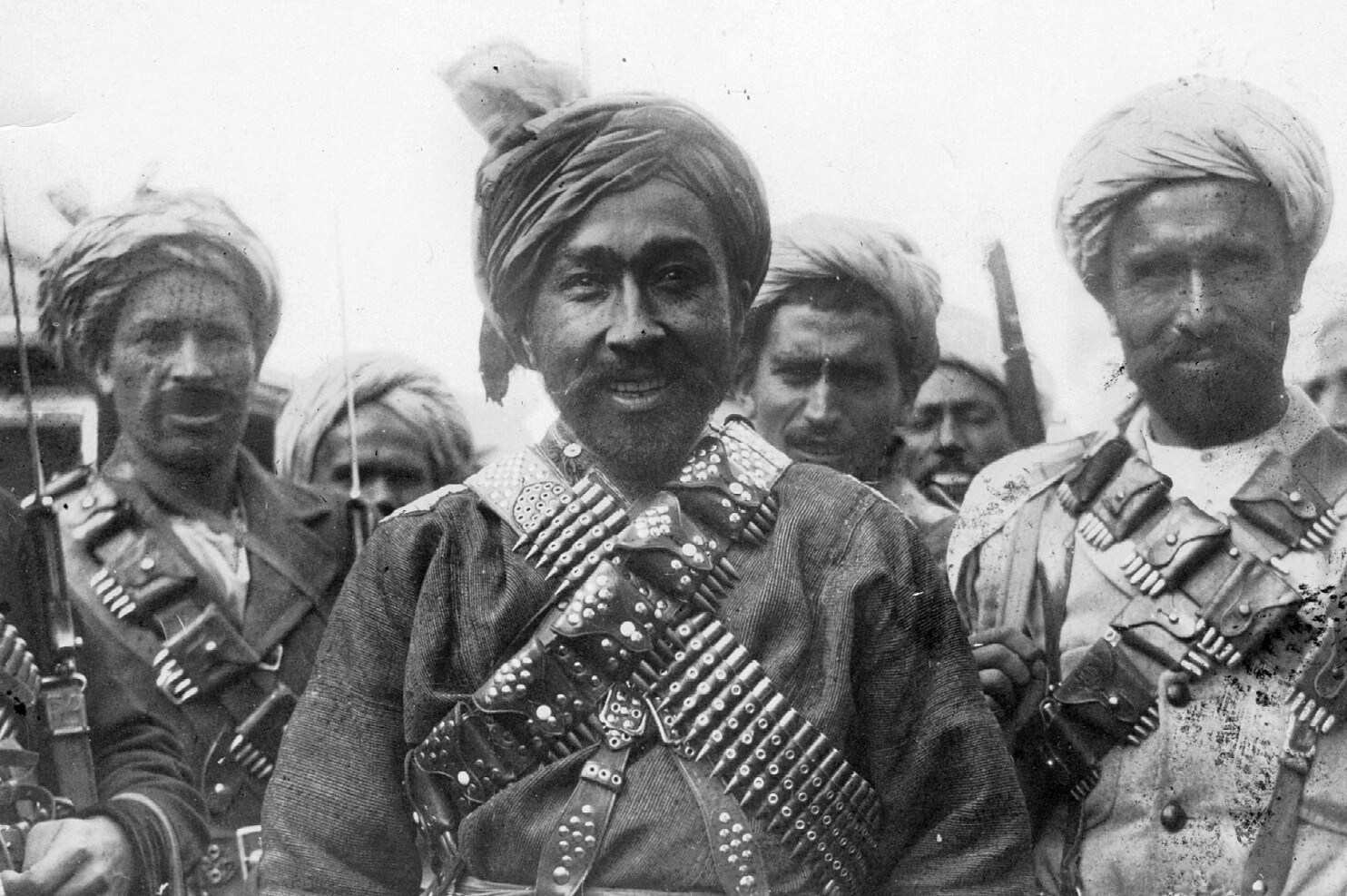
Kalakani with followers

The Pashtun tribes, including the Ghilzai, chafed under rule by a non-Pashtun. When Amanullah's last feeble attempt to regain his throne failed, those next in line were the Musahiban brothers. They were also from the Mohammedzai and Barakzai family trees, and their great-grandfather was an older brother of Dost Mohammad.

The five prominent Musahiban brothers included Nadir Shah, the eldest, who had been Amānullāh's minister of war. They were permitted to cross through the Khyber Pakhtunkhwa to enter Afghanistan and take up arms. Once on the other side, however, they were not allowed back and forth across the border to use British-Indian territory as a sanctuary, nor were they allowed to gather together a tribal army on the British side of the Durand Line. However, the Musahiban brothers and the tribes successfully ignored these restrictions.

During this period anti-Soviet rebels from Central Asia known as Basmachi utilized the period of instability in Afghanistan to launch raids into the Soviet Union. The Basmachi had taken refuge in Afghanistan earlier in the decade after they were expelled from Soviet Central Asia by the Soviet military and they swore allegiance to the Emir of Bukhara, who lived in exile in Kabul. One of these raids was led by Faizal Maksum, who operated under the command of Basmachi commander Ibrahim Bek. Faizal Maksum's forces briefly captured the town of Gharm until they were expelled by Soviet forces. The Basmachi operated in Afghanistan due to their alliance with Habibullah Ghazi and after his fall from power they were expelled from Afghanistan.

== Death ==
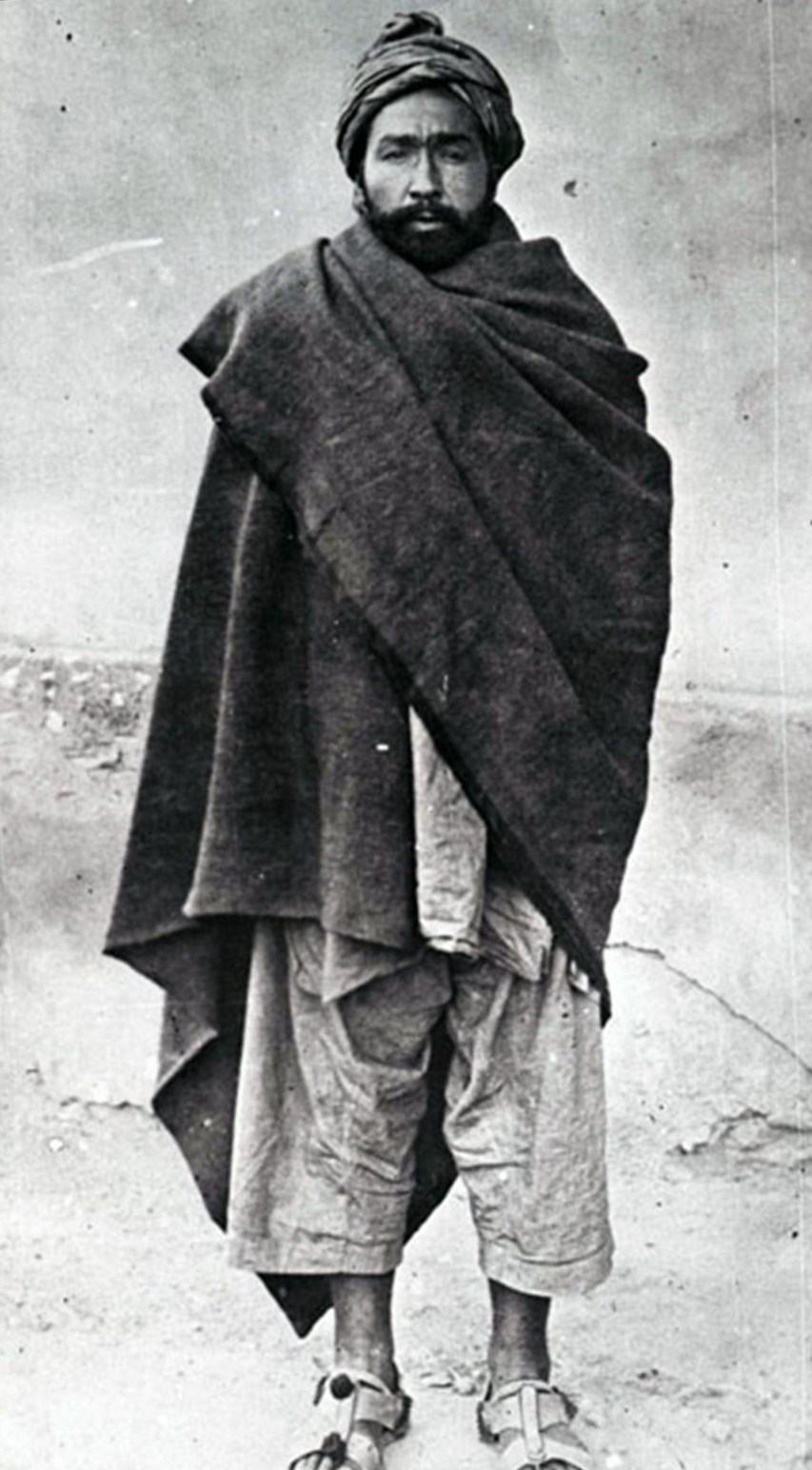
Kalakani as a prisoner in November 1929, shortly before his execution.

Kalakani (far left) and his closest followers were ordered by Mohammad Nadir Shah to be executed (likely at the Arg) and their bodies displayed publicly at Chaman-e-Uzuri (pictured) in Kabul on 1 November 1929.

After several unsuccessful attempts, Nadir and his brothers finally raised a sufficiently large force—mostly from the British side of the Durand Line—to take Kabul on 13 October 1929. Nadir considered pardoning Kalakani, even swearing on the Quran according to some unsubstantiated reports, but pressure from loyal tribes and fear of further conflict led him to execute Kalakani with some of his closest followers on 1 November 1929. Among these followers were Hamidullah Kalakani—Habibullah’s own brother, Sayyed Hussein, Rizwan Ibn-Rahim, previous Governor of Kabul—Malik Mohsin, and Shir Jan. Kalakani's last words prior to being executed were "I have nothing to ask God; he has given me everything I desired. God has made me King."

His remains were laid below a hilltop mausoleum at an undisclosed location for 87 years, until a campaign in 2016 by some Tajiks and scholars who wanted him to be reburied in a better place. This caused days of political and slight sectarian tensions in Kabul - Tajiks and religious scholars, who consider Kalakani to have been a devout Muslim, wanted him to be buried at the Shahrara hill and asked then-President Ashraf Ghani to plan a state burial. Opponents of Kalakani, mostly Pashtuns and secularists, were against this plan, including vice-president Abdul Rashid Dostum who claimed that he could not be buried at a hilltop important to Uzbek heritage. He was eventually buried at the hill on 2 September 2016, with one death and four injuries occurring in clashes between his supporters and pro-Dostum soldiers.

== See also ==
- Afghan Civil War (1928–1929)

== Notes ==
Habibullah Kalakani Non-dynastic Born: 19 January 1891 Died: 1 November 1929
Regnal titles
| Preceded by Inayatullah Khan | King of Afghanistan; 17 January 1929 – 13 October 1929 | Succeeded by Mohammad Nadir Shah |
