= List of wars involving Afghanistan =

This is a list of wars involving Afghanistan.

Conflict	Afghanistan and allies	Opponents	Results	Details
Hotak dynasty (1709–1738)
Campaigns of Nader Shah (1720s–1747)	Hotak Emirate; Ottoman Empire; (Safavid Iran) Safavid Empire; Crimean Khanate; Gazikumukh Khanate; Mughal Empire; Khanate of Bukhara; Khanate of Khiva; Khanate of Kokand; Lezgins; Akusha-Dargo Union; Avar Khanate; Omani Empire; Imamate of Oman; Hyderabad State; Oudh State; Sind State; Banu Ka'b Sheikhdom; Al Qawasim Sheikhdom; Emirate of Al Humaid; Emirate of Muhammara; Principality of Ardalan; Sultanate of Herat; Shaki Khanate; Elisu Sultanate; Kingdom of Kartli; Kingdom of Kakheti	Empires of Persia: Safavid Iran (prior to 1736) Afsharid Iran (post 1736): Numerous clients & vassal states	Persian victory	Persian victory: The Persian Empire expands to its greatest extent since antiquity and subsequently collapses; Ephemeral Persian dominance over Central Eurasia; Eventual collapse of the Afsharid Empire
Battle of Gulnabad (1722)	Hotak Dynasty	Safavid Empire	Hotaki victory	
Siege of Isfahan (1722)	Hotaks	Safavid Iran	Hotaki victory	
Ottoman–Hotaki War (1726–1727)	(Emirate of Afghanistan) Hotak Empire	Ottoman Empire	Treaty of Hamedan	Treaty of Hamedan: See outcome
Battle of Damghan (1729)	Hotak dynasty	Safavid Iran	Safavid victory	Safavid victory: The Hotaki dynasty lost territory in Persia and ended the Hotaki dynasty power in Persia
Battle of Khwar Pass (1729)	Hotak dynasty	Safavid Iran	Safavid victory	Safavid victory: Ashraf's ambush failed
Battle of Murche-Khort (1729)	Hotak dynasty Supported by: Ottoman Empire	Safavid Iran	Safavid victory	Safavid victory: Liberation of Isfahan
Battle of Zarghan (1730)	Hotak dynasty local Arab tribes	Safavid Iran	Safavid victory	
Herat campaign of 1730–1732 (1731-1732)	Sadozai Sultanate of Herat; Hotak dynasty	Safavid Iran; Afghan loyalists	Safavid victory	Safavid victory: Fall of the Sadozai Sultanate of Herat; Herat brought under Persian suzerainty once again
Siege of Kandahar (1737-1738)	Hotak dynasty	Afsharid Persia	Afsharid victory	Afsharid victory: Fall of the Hotak dynasty.; Kandahar and environs are incorporated into Afsharid Persia Part of the city was destroyed by Nader Shah
Sadozai Sultanate of Herat (1716–1732)
Battle of Sangan (1727)	Abdali Afghans; Sangani Rebels	Safavid loyalists	Safavid victory	Safavid victory: Nader Shah secures the Khaf and Qa'in regions for the Safavids
Herat Campaign of 1729	Abdali Pashtuns (Afghans)	(Safavid Iran) Safavid loyalists	Safavid victory	Safavid victory: Herat becomes a vassal of the Safavids
Battle of Kafer Qal'eh (1729)	Abdali Afghans	Safavid loyalists	Safavid victory	
Durrani Empire (1747–1823)
Indian campaign of Ahmad Shah Durrani (1748—1769)	Afghan Empire; Allied states: Rohilkhand; Amb; Sind; Kalat; Oudh; Bahawalpur; Malerkotla; Las Bela; Kharan; Pothohar; Dera Ghazi Khan; Makran; Jammu; Farrukhabad; Chitral; Dir; Bhimber; Kangra; Kahlur; Chamba; Kumaon; Mankera; Allied tribes and groups: Durrani; Yusufzai; Marwat; Bangash; Qizilbash; Afridi; Khattak; Gandapur; Kakar; Jadoon	Mughal Empire: Lahore; Multan; Delhi; Agra; Kashmir; Maratha Empire: Peshwa's Dominion; Baroda; Gwalior; Indore; Kolhapur; Nagpur; Jhansi; Jath; Sikh Confederacy: Phulkian Misl; Patiala (from 1762); Jind (from 1763); Ahluwalia Misl; Bhangi Misl; Kanhaiya Misl; Ramgarhia Misl; Singhpuria Misl; Panjgarhia Misl; Kalsia (from 1763); Nishanwalia Misl; Sukerchakia Misl; Dallewalia Misl; Nakai Misl; Shaheedan Misl; Other states: Bharatpur; Jaipur; Bhopal; Udaipur; Garhwal; Kashmir; Amarkot; Junagadh; Kurwai; Kutch; Jhang	Durrani victory	
Battle of Lahore (1748)	Durrani Empire	Mughal Empire	Durrani victory	
Battle of Manupur (1748)	Durrani Empire	Mughal Empire; Kingdom of Jaipur; Malerkotla State	Mughal victory	
Afghan–Sikh Wars (1748–1837)	Durrani Empire (1747–1823); Emirate of Kabul (1823–1837); Supported by: Khanate of Kalat; Kingdom of Mankera; Principality of Qandahar; Peshawar Sardars	Dal Khalsa (1748–1765); Sikh Confederacy (1765–1799); Sikh Empire (1799–1837)	Inconclusive	Inconclusive: Sikhs seize Multan, Kashmir, Peshawar and the Khyber Pass.
Battle of Lahore (1752)	Durrani Empire	Mughal Empire	Afghan victory	
Sack of Delhi (1757)	Durrani Empire	Mughal Empire; Bengal	Durrani victory	Durrani victory: Kashmir, Lahore, Multan, Sirhind, and all territories west of the Indus river are annexed by the Durrani Empire.
Battle of Narela (1757)	Durrani Empire	Maratha Confederacy	Durrani victory	
Battle of Narela (1758-1761)	Afghan Empire: Rohilkhand	Mughal Empire (nominal): Maratha Empire; Sikh Confederacy	Afghan victory:	Afghan victory: Afghan Empire retains control over much of contended territories including Peshawar and the Punjab until the Sutlej; Mughal emperor exiled and Delhi occupied by Afghan vassal Rohilkhand
Battle of Taraori (1759)	Durrani Empire	Maratha Confederacy; Mughal Empire	Durrani victory	
Battle of Barari Ghat (1760)	Durrani Empire; Kingdom of Rohilkhand	Maratha Empire	Durrani-Rohilla victory	
Battle of Sikandarabad (1760)	Durrani Empire; Kingdom of Rohilkhand	Malharro Holkar	Durrani victory	
Third Battle of Panipat (1761)	Durrani Empire; Supported by: Kingdom of Rohilkhand; Khanate of Kalat; Kingdom of Awadh; Amb State; Kingdom of Kumaon; Sind State; Mughal nobles	Maratha Empire; Peshwa; Holkar State of Indore; Scindia State of Gwalior; (Maratha Empire) Gaekwad State of Baroda	Durrani victory	Durrani victory: Mughal emperor exiled to Awadh
Battle of Nimla (1809)	Durrani Empire	Coalition of Shah Mahmud	Mahmud Coalition victory	Mahmud Coalition victory: Mahmud Shah restored as ruler of the Durrani Empire; Durrani Empire usurped by Shah Mahmud
Battle of Kafir Qala (1818)	Durrani Empire	Qajar Iran	Inconclusive	
Emirate of Herat (1793–1863)
First Herat War (1837–1838)	Emirate of Herat; East India Company Supported by: British Empire: Afghans; Aimaq tribesmen; Maimana Khanate; Andkhui Khanate; Sheberghan Khanate; Sar-i Pul Khanate; Bukhara Emirate; Khiva Khanate	Qajar Iran Supported by: Russian Empire; Principality of Qandahār	Iranian withdrawal	
Herat campaign (1862-1863)	Principality of Herat	Emirate of Afghanistan; Jamshidi tribe Supported by: British Empire; East India Company	Afghan victory	Afghan victory: Herat incorporated into the Emirate of Afghanistan
Emirate of Kabul (1823-1855) Emirate of Afghanistan (1855-1926)
Dost Mohammad's Campaign to Jalalabad (1834)	Emirate of Kabul	Amirs of Jalalabad; Kunar; Mohmand Tribe	Barakzai Afghan victory	Barakzai Afghan victory: Subjugation of Jalalabad, Bala Bagh, Laghman, and Kunar
Expedition of Shuja ul-Mulk (1833-1834)	Barakzai; Principality of Kandahar; Emirate of Kabul	Durranis; Shah Shujah's forces Supported by British Empire; East India Company; Sikh Empire	Barakzai Afghan victory	Barakzai Afghan victory: Shah Shujah forced to retreat
First Anglo-Afghan War (1838–1842)	Barakzais; Emirate of Kabul; Principality of Kandahar; Khanate of Kalat; Khulm (August 1840, November 1841 onwards.); Marri; Bugti; Afghan Tribes; Barakzai Loyalists	Durranis; British Empire • East India Company; Durrani Kingdom; Maimana Khanate; Khulm (August 1840 for mere days, September 1840–November 1841); Sadozai loyalists Supported By: Sikh Empire	Barakzai Afghan victory	
Khost rebellion (1856–1857)	Afghanistan	Rebel tribes: Khostwal; Waziri	Government victory	Rebellion suppressed
Second Anglo-Afghan War (1878–1880)	Afghanistan	British Empire; India; Afzalids	Treaty of Gandamak	Treaty: Abdur Rahman Khan installed as Emir; Kandahar re-ceded to Afghanistan. Districts of Quetta, Pishin, Sibi, Harnai & Thal Chotiali ceded to British India
Russian conquest of Central Asia (1885)	Kazakh rebels; Turkmen tribes; Afghanistan (1885); British Empire (1885)	Russian Empire; Allied Turkic tribes	Russian victory	Russian victory: Establishment of Russian Turkestan in Central Asia; Bukhara, Khiva, and Kokand made protectorates of the Russian Empire
Panjdeh incident (1885 (Note: The final agreement was signed only in July 1887))	Emirate of Afghanistan; United Kingdom	Russian Empire	Defeat	Afghan Boundary Commission delineates Afghan–Russian border from 1884 to 1888; Russia cedes Zu'l Faqar but retains Panjdeh; See § Results
1888–1893 Hazara uprisings	Emirate of Afghanistan	Hazara people	Afghan victory	Killing and displacement of 60% of the Hazara people's population including 35,000 families that fled to northern Afghanistan, Mashhad (Qajar Iran) and Quetta
Khost rebellion (1912)	Emirate of Afghanistan	Rebel tribes: Mangal; Jadran; Ghilzai	Government victory	
Basmachi movement (1916–1930)	Russian Republic (1917): Russian SFSR; Turkestan ASSR; Kirghiz ASSR; Khorezm PSR; Bukharan PSR; Soviet Union (from December 30, 1922); In cooperation with: (Kingdom of Afghanistan) Amanullah loyalists (1929); Afghanistan (1930)	Basmachi movement; Khanate of Khiva (1918–20); (Russia) White Army; Alash Autonomy (1919–20); Emirate of Bukhara (1920); Supported by: Afghanistan (until mid-1922); (Emirate of Afghanistan (1929)) Saqqawists (1929); Emirate of Afghanistan (1929)	Soviet-Afghan victory	Soviet-Afghan victory: Turkestan incorporated into the Soviet Union
Khost rebellion (1912)	Emirate of Afghanistan	Rebel tribes: Mangal; Jadran; Ghilzai	Government victory	
Third Anglo-Afghan War (1919)	Afghanistan	United Kingdom: India	Inconclusive	See § Outcome and negotiation
Alizai rebellion of 1923 (Note: According to Survey of International Affairs, the rebellion started in summer 1923, and according to An Intimate War: An Oral History of the Helmand Conflict, 1978–2012, the rebellion lasted 6 months. Since all sources agree that the rebellion took place in 1923, the earliest possible start date is 22 June (the date of summer solstice in Afghanistan in 1923), while last possible start date is 1 July (6 months after any later date would put the end date in 1924).)	Emirate of Afghanistan	Alizai rebels	Government victory	
Khost rebellion (1924–c. early 1925)	Emirate of Afghanistan Allied tribes: Khogyani; Shinwari	Rebel tribes: Mangal; Alikhel; Sulaimankhel; Jaji; Jadran; Ahmadzai	Afghan government victory	Afghan government victory: Execution of rebel leaders; Various reforms delayed
Saqqawist low-level insurgency (1924–1928)	Afghanistan	Saqqawists	Escalated into civil war	
Urtatagai conflict (1925–1926)	Emirate of Afghanistan (1925–1926); Kingdom of Afghanistan (1926)	Soviet Union	Afghan victory	Afghan victory: The Soviet Union recognizes Urtatagai as Afghan territory; Afghanistan forced to restrain Basmachi border raids
Kingdom of Afghanistan (1926–1973)
Afghan Civil War (1928–1929)	Kingdom of Afghanistan Hazara volunteers Various anti-Saqqawist Pashtun tribes: Wardak; Maydan; Jalriz; Sanglakh; Soviet Union (See 1929 Red Army intervention in Afghanistan)	Saqqawists (November 1928 – October 1929); Emirate of Afghanistan (January – October 1929); Supported by: Basmachi movement (1929) Shinwari tribesmen (November–December 1928)	Anti-Saqqawist victory	Anti-Saqqawist victory: Fall of Amanullah Khan's government in January 1929, leading to the establishment of a Saqqawist government.; Saqqawist collapse in October 1929, leading to Mohammed Nādir Khān becoming King of Afghanistan.
Red Army intervention in Afghanistan (1929)	Soviet Union; Kingdom of Afghanistan	Emirate of Afghanistan; Basmachi	Inconclusive	Inconclusive: The Red Army established control over Balkh Province, but withdrew to the USSR after the flight of King Amanullah Khan abroad.
Shinwari rebellion (1930)	Kingdom of Afghanistan	Shinwari tribesmen	Government victory	Rebellion suppressed
Kuhistan rebellion (1930)	Kingdom of Afghanistan	Saqqawist rebels	Government victory	
Battle of Herat (1931)	Kingdom of Afghanistan	Saqqawists	Government victory	Saqqawists wiped out
Afghan tribal revolts of 1944–1947	Afghanistan • Allied Nuristani and Shinwari tribesmen United Kingdom • India	Rebel tribes: Zadran (1944–1947); Safi (until 1946); Mangal (1945)	Afghan government victory	
1945 Hazara Rebellion (1945–1946)	Kingdom of Afghanistan	Hazara rebels	Rebellion failed	Rebellion failed: Hazara Rebels withdrawal from District; Hazara Rebel’s Demands met; Taxes revoked
Afghanistan–Pakistan border skirmishes (1949–present)	(Taliban) Afghanistan Tehrik-i-Taliban Pakistan (since 2012); Jamaat-ul-Ahrar (2015–2020)	Pakistan	Ongoing	Ongoing: Occasional clashes
Republic of Afghanistan (1973–1978)
Panjshir Valley uprising (1975)	Afghanistan	Jamiat-e Islami: Pakistan; ISI; Supported by: Iran; SAVAK	Afghan government victory	Afghan government victory: Uprising suppressed successfully; Jamiat-e Islami commanders flee to Pakistan; End of the 1975 uprisings in Afghanistan
Democratic Republic of Afghanistan (1978–1987)
Saur Revolution (1978)	Republic of Afghanistan	People's Democratic Party of Afghanistan	PDPA victory	PDPA victory: Overthrow and execution of Mohammad Daoud Khan and his family; Purging of Daoud's supporters from the government; Establishment of the Democratic Republic of Afghanistan; Eventual Soviet military intervention
Soviet–Afghan War (1979–1989)	Soviet Union; Afghanistan	Afghan mujahideen Pakistan	Defeat	Afghan mujahideen victory: Geneva Accords; Withdrawal of Soviet forces from Afghanistan; Afghan Civil War continues
Republic of Afghanistan (1987–1992)
First Afghan Civil War (1989–1992)	Republic of Afghanistan; Supported by: Soviet Union (until 1991); India; Commonwealth of Independent States (from 1991); Tajikistan; Turkmenistan; Uzbekistan; Russia (until January 1992)	Afghan Interim Government; Jamiat-e Islami; Hezb-e Islami Gulbuddin (until July 1989); National Islamic Front of Afghanistan; Ittehad-e Islami; Hezb-i Islami Khalis; Harakat-i Inqilab-i Islami; Independent Factions: Khalq (1990); Hezb-e Islami Gulbuddin (from July 1989) (Afghanistan) Junbish-i Milli (from 1992); Foreign Mujahideen: Al Qaeda; Maktab al-Khidamat; Various factions also fought among each other Supported by: Pakistan United States Saudi Arabia United Kingdom China Germany Iran	Afghan Interim Government victory	Dissolution of the Homeland Party Government; The Peshawar Accord leads to the creation of the Islamic State of Afghanistan on 28 April 1992; Continued civil war among Mujahideen forces
Islamic State of Afghanistan (1992–2001)
Second Afghan Civil War (1992–1996)	Islamic State of Afghanistan: (Afghanistan) Northern Alliance; Jamiat-e Islami; (Afghanistan) Shura-e Nazar; Hezb-e Islami Khalis (until mid-1992); (Afghanistan) Ittehad-e Islami; (Afghanistan) Harakat-i-Inqilab; (Afghanistan) Jebh-e Nejat-e Melli; Mahaz-e Milli; (Afghanistan) Harakat-i Islami; Hezb-i Wahdat (until Dec. 1992); (Afghanistan) Junbish-i Milli (until Jan. 1994; from Aug. 1994); Hezb-e Islami Gulbuddin (from late 1994); Supported by: Saudi Arabia; Uzbekistan (until Jan. 1994; from Aug. 1994); Iran (until Dec. 1992)	Hezb-e Islami Gulbuddin (until late 1994) Khalq (pro Gulbuddin factions, until late 1994); Supported by: Pakistan Hezb-i Wahdat (after Dec. 1992) (Afghanistan) Junbish-i Milli (Jan. 1994-Aug. 1994); Supported by: Uzbekistan Regional Kandahar Militia Leaders Afghan Army and Airforce Remnants (allegedly, until October 1992) Taliban (from late 1994); Khalq (pro Taliban factions, from late 1994); Al-Qaeda (from early 1996); Supported by: Pakistan	Military stalemate in Northern Afghanistan	Taliban take control of Kabul and most of Afghanistan; Islamic Emirate of Afghanistan established; Thousands of civilians killed, millions driven from their homes, Kabul heavily damaged.; Grave mistreatment of civilians (murder, looting, extortion); Civil war continues (1996–2001)
Islamic Emirate of Afghanistan (1996–2001)
Third Afghan Civil War (1996–2001)	Islamic Emirate of Afghanistan: (Afghanistan) Taliban; Al-Qaeda	Islamic State of Afghanistan: (Afghanistan) United Front	Stalemate	Stalemate with varying fronts between the Taliban and Massoud's forces (United Front)
Islamic Republic of Afghanistan (2001–2021)
War in Afghanistan (2001–2021)	Invasion (2001): United States; Northern Alliance; United Kingdom; France; Canada; Italy; Germany; Australia; New Zealand	Invasion (2001): Islamic Emirate of Afghanistan; Taliban; Haqqani network; Non-state allies: Al-Qaeda; 055 Brigade; Islamic Movement of Uzbekistan Tehreek-e-Nafaz-e-Shariat-e-Mohammadi Jama'at al-Tawhid wal-Jihad	American-led coalition victory (Phase 1)	Collapse of the Islamic Emirate of Afghanistan (1996–2001); Establishment of the Transitional Islamic State of Afghanistan; Start of the War in Afghanistan (2001–2021)
ISAF/RS phase (2001–2021): Islamic State of Afghanistan (2001–2002); Afghan Transitional Authority (2002–2004); Islamic Republic of Afghanistan (2004–2021); ISAF (2001–2014; 51 countries); United States; United Kingdom; Canada; Germany; Australia; Italy; New Zealand; France; Turkey; Georgia; Jordan; Bulgaria; Poland; Romania; Spain; Czech Republic; Republic of Macedonia; Denmark; Armenia; Azerbaijan; Finland; Croatia; Hungary; Norway; Lithuania; Mongolia; United Arab Emirates; Belgium; Portugal; Slovakia; Netherlands; Montenegro; Latvia; Sweden; Albania; Ukraine; Bosnia–Herzegovina; Greece; Ireland; Iceland; Estonia; Austria; Malaysia; Slovenia; Colombia; Switzerland; Bahrain; El Salvador; Luxembourg; South Korea; Tonga; Singapore; Resolute Support (2015–2021; 36 countries); High Council of the Islamic Emirate of Afghanistan (allegedly; from 2015); Khost Protection Force and other pro-government paramilitaries	ISAF/RS phase (2001–2021): Taliban; · Haqqani network (from 2002); al-Qaeda; · Al-Qaeda in the Indian Subcontinent; Taliban splinter groups; · Mullah Dadullah Front (from 2012); · Fidai Mahaz (from 2013); Supported by: Hezb-e-Islami Gulbuddin (on and off until 2016); Islamic Jihad Union (from 2002); Islamic Movement of Uzbekistan (until 2015); Turkistan Islamic Party; Lashkar-e-Jhangvi; Pakistani Taliban; Lashkar-e-Islam; Iran (alleged, but denied by Iran); Pakistan (alleged, but denied by Pakistan); Russia (alleged, but denied by Russia); Saudi Arabia (alleged, but denied by Saudi Arabia); Qatar (alleged by Saudi Arabia, but denied by Qatar); China (alleged by the US, but denied by China); RS phase (2015–2021): ISIL–KP (from 2015): Islamic Movement of Uzbekistan (since 2015)	Taliban victory (Phase 2)	Destruction of al-Qaeda militant training camps; Death of Osama bin Laden in Pakistan; Coalition failure to quell Taliban insurgency since 2006; Doha Agreement (2020); Withdrawal of United States troops from Afghanistan (2020–2021); 2021 Taliban offensive culminating in Fall of Kabul; Overthrow of coalition-backed Islamic Republic of Afghanistan on 15 August 2021	
Afghanistan–Iran border skirmishes (2007–2023): 2009 Afghanistan–Iran clash; 2021 Afghanistan–Iran clashes; 2023 Afghanistan–Iran clash; part of Afghan conflict	Islamic Republic of Afghanistan Afghanistan	Iran	Stalemate	Status quo ante bellum
Islamic Emirate of Afghanistan (2021–present)
Islamic State–Taliban conflict (2015–present)	Afghanistan; Taliban; Haqqani network; Al-Qaeda; Islamic Movement of Uzbekistan (pro-Taliban & anti-IS factions); Turkistan Islamic Party; Pakistani Taliban	Islamic State; Khorasan Province; IS central command; Mullah Dadullah Front(until 2016); Fidai Mahaz (until 2021); Islamic Movement of Uzbekistan (pro-IS factions)	Ongoing	Initial Taliban victories in the battles of Darzab and Nangarhar; Collapse of the Islamic State stronghold in eastern Afghanistan in 2019; Taliban captures all of the former Islamic Republic territory in 2021; IS-KP regains strength in eastern Afghanistan following Taliban takeover; IS-KP rebellion in eastern Afghanistan suppressed; Continued IS-KP guerilla warfare and insurgent attacks, including cross-border attacks into Pakistan
Republican insurgency in Afghanistan (2021–present)	Islamic Emirate of Afghanistan: Taliban; al-Qaeda (alleged) Supported by: Pakistan (until 2024; unconfirmed)	Islamic Republic of Afghanistan loyalists (Note: Though the Islamic Republic of Afghanistan ceased to exist on 15 August 2021, many soldiers, officials and other loyalists relocated to Panjshir and rallied under its banner. These elements and exiled officials claimed to maintain the republic in some form, with Amrullah Saleh styling himself "caretaker" president.): National Resistance Front (NRF); Ahmad Khan Samangani Front; Afghanistan Freedom Front; Afghanistan Islamic National & Liberation Movement; Many smaller factions (Note: Freedom Corps, Liberation Front of Afghanistan, Soldiers of Hazaristan, Freedom and Democracy Front, High Council of Resistance, Atta Mohammad Noor's militia, ect.); Supported by: Tajikistan (alleged); Pakistan (alleged, since 2024) Independent militias Taliban dissidents	Ongoing	Ongoing as a hit-and-run campaign; Taliban captures the Panjshir Valley, NRF controls no territory
Afghanistan–Tajikistan border skirmishes (2022–present): Part of Afghan conflict and Post-Soviet conflicts	Afghanistan Jamaat Ansarullah; Other anti-Tajikistan militants	Tajikistan National Resistance Front of Afghanistan; Other anti-Taliban militants	Ongoing	Inconclusive situation
Afghanistan–Pakistan clashes (2024–present): 2026 Afghanistan–Pakistan war	Afghanistan Pakistani Taliban	Pakistan	Ongoing	Pakistan launches Operation Ghazab Lil Haq

== Sources ==
- Blood, Peter R, ed. (1996). Pakistan: A Country Study. Diane Publishing. ISBN 9780788136313.
- Goodson, Larry P. (2011). Afghanistan's Endless War: State Failure, Regional Politics, and the Rise of the Taliban. University of Washington Press. ISBN 978-0-295-80158-2. OCLC 1026403863.
- Johnson, Casey Garret (November 2016). "The Rise and Stall of the Islamic State in Afghanistan" (PDF). Special Report (395). Washington, D.C.: United States Institute of Peace: 9–13. Archived from the original (PDF) on 10 March 2017.
- Noelle-Karimi, Christine (2014). The Pearl in its Midst: Herat and the Mapping of Khurasan (15th-19th Centuries). Austrian Academy of Sciences. ISBN 978-3700172024.
- Zenn, Jacob (5 November 2021). "Briefs" (PDF). Terrorism Monitor. 19 (21). Jamestown Foundation: 1–3.
