= Khost rebellion (1924–1925) =

Military uprising against the Afghan monarch

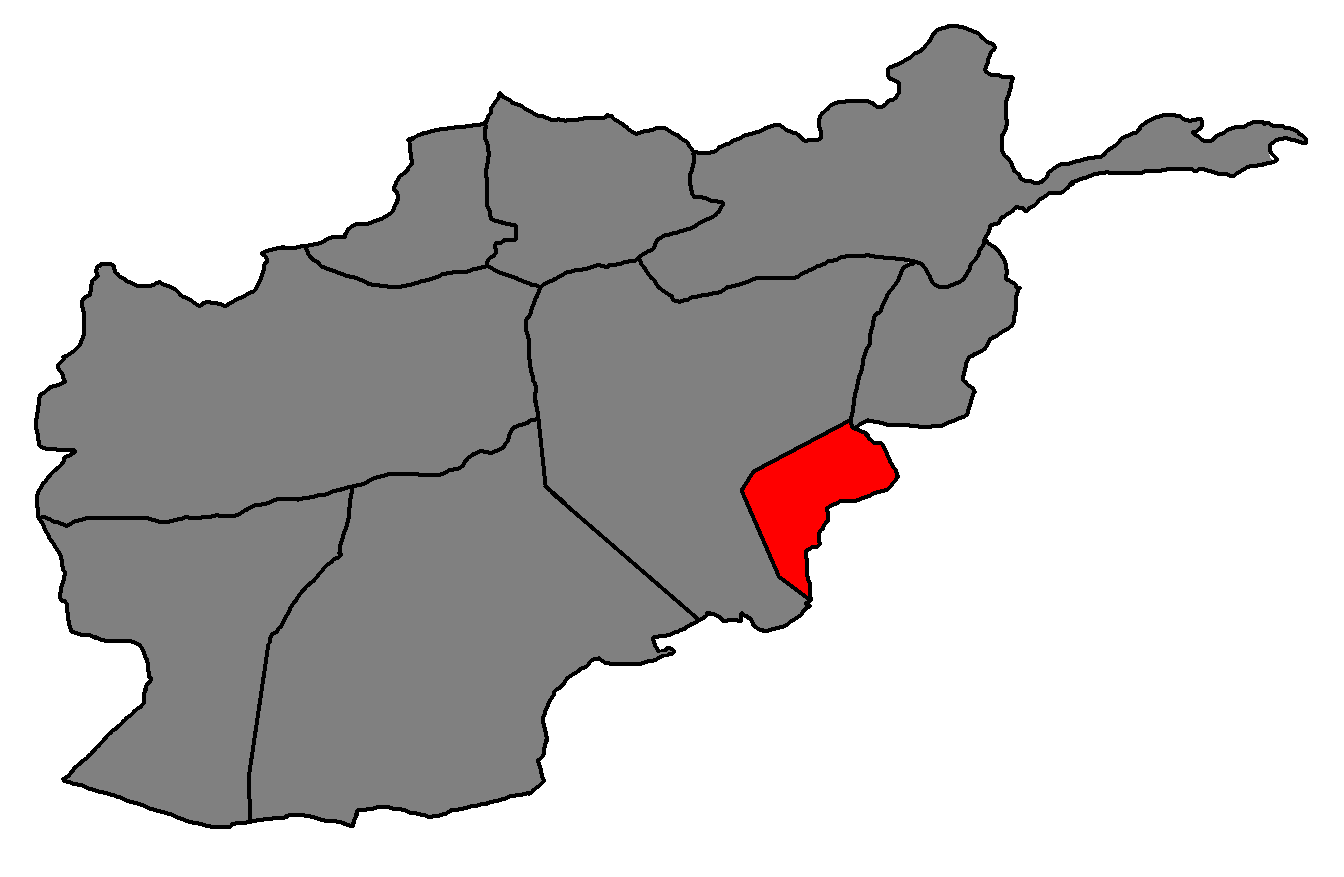
- A map of Southern Province, Afghanistan, where most of the fighting took place.
Date	March 1924 – c. early 1925 (Note: The time-frame of March 1924 to January 1925 is provided by Ludwig Adamec, Hafizullah Emadi, H. A. R. Gibb, Robert Johnson, S. Fida Yunas, Narenderpal Singh, and Frank Clements. Senzil Nawid also states that it began in March 1924, but specifically gives "30 January" as the end date, instead of just "January". Even though the previously given dates can not logically be more than 11 months, Fayz Muhammad stated that the rebellion lasted 1 year and 2 months, and only gave the start date as "1924" without specifying an end date. A Guide to Intra-state Wars: An Examination of Civil, Regional, and Intercommunal Wars, 1816–2014 gives the start date as 15 March 1924 and the end date as March 1925. According to the contemporary German author and geographer, Emil Trinkler, as well as Sana Haroon, the rebellion was quelled "towards the end of the year" of 1924.)
Location	Southern Province, Emirate of Afghanistan
Result	Afghan government victory; Execution of rebel leaders; Various reforms delayed

Belligerents
Emirate of Afghanistan Allied tribes: Khogyani; Shinwari	Rebel tribes: Mangal; Alikhel; Sulaimankhel; Jaji; Jadran; Ahmadzai

Commanders and leaders
(Emirate of Afghanistan) Amanullah Khan; (Emirate of Afghanistan) Ali Ahmad Khan	Abd-al Karim; Mulla Abd Allah (executed)

Units involved
Royal Afghan Army: "Model Battalion"; Afghan Air Force	Unknown

Strength
10,000 – 30,000 (Not all loyal, or fit for service); 2 aircraft	6,000 (Initial – Mangal tribe only); 4,000 (Sulaimankhel, August 1924); 5,000 (Final)

Casualties and losses
At least 671 killed	At least 300 killed
- Total dead: 14,000; At least 1,100

The Khost rebellion, also known as the 1924 Mangal uprising, the Khost revolt or the Mangal Revolt was an uprising against the Westernization and modernizing reforms of Afghanistan’s king, Amanullah Khan. The uprising was launched in Southern Province, Afghanistan, and lasted from March 1924 to 1925. It was fought by the Mangal Pashtun tribe, later joined by the Sulaiman Khel, Ali Khel, Jaji, Jadran and Ahmadzai tribes. After causing the death of over 14,000 Afghans, the revolt was finally quelled in 1925.

== Background ==
Prior to 1924, the city of Khost had rebelled twice: the first rebellion took place from 1856 to 1857 and was fought by Khostwal and Waziri and Dawar tribesmen against the rule of Dost Mohammad Khan. The second rebellion took place in 1912 and was a rebellion by the Mangal, Jadran, and Ghilzai tribes against the "rapacity and exactions" of the local governor, and saw Habibullah Khan's reign contested by Jehandad Khan.

There were multiple reasons for the rebellion in 1924, including opposition to the Westernizing reforms made by King Amanullah of Afghanistan, a code promulgated in 1923 called the "Nizamnama", which granted women more freedom and allowed the government to regulate other issues seen as family problems, which were formerly handled by religious authorities, a new law which restricted passage for the eastern tribes across the Durand Line, restrictions placed on the practice of polygyny, the abolition of child marriage, the imposition of property taxes, the "insolent, brazen and deceitful" actions of district chiefs, governors, and military officers, the bribery of ministers, judges and clerks, ignoring the pleas of "the needy", the increase of customs duties, a military draft, and other regulations which were aimed at "ending strife and violence".

According to the contemporary Afghan historian Fayz Muhammad, the immediate cause of the revolt laid in a dispute, where a man from the Mangal tribe claimed he was betrothed to a woman, declaring that he had been engaged with her since childhood. Some of this man's enemies went to the governor of the southern province, Amr al-Din, and the qazi-magistrate, Abdullah, commonly known as Mullah-i-Lang or Pir-i-Lang (the lame Mullah), and disputed this claim. With consent of the fiancée, Amr-al Din rejected this claim, however, Mulla Abd Allah had been bribed to see that the fiancée had been betrothed, and complained that this rejection violated the Sharia, but this complaint was ignored, which led Mulla to make up his mind to instigate a rebellion.

== Uprising ==
=== Uprising begins (March–April 1924) ===
With the new code in one hand and the Koran in the other, they called the tribes to choose between the word of God and that of man, and adjured them to resist demands, the acceptance of which would reduce their sons to slavery in the Afghan army and their daughters to the degrading influence of Western education.

— British minister in Kabul, reporting to London.

In mid-March 1924, the city of Khost, where protests had been ongoing since autumn 1923, erupted in an open rebellion against the government, led by Mulla Abd Allah. With appeals to Pashtun honour, incitements, and promises of paradise for true-believing Muslims, Mulla succeeded at raising all the tribes of the Southern Province against the Afghan government. Initially, the government did not take the uprising seriously, but by the end of March 1924 they had come to understand the seriousness of the situation.

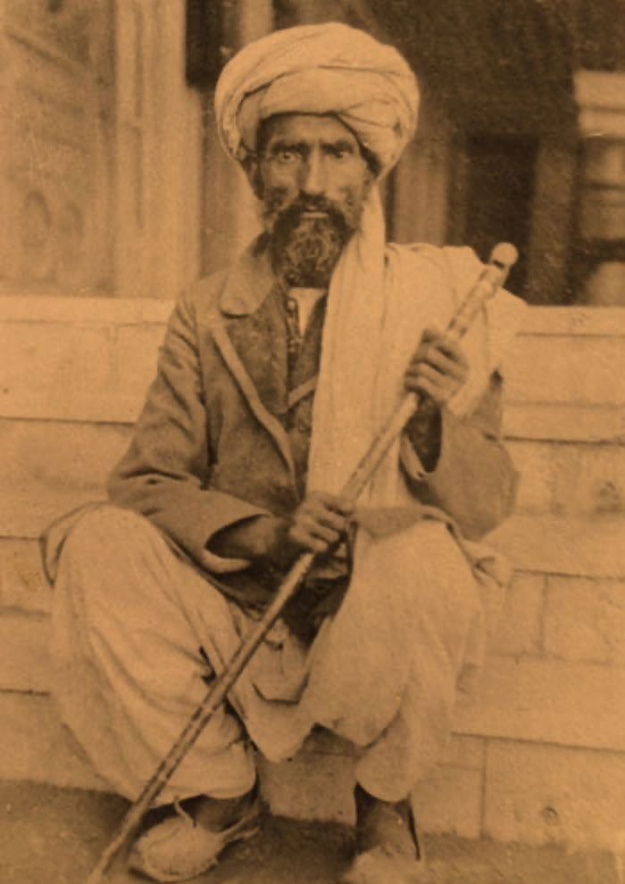
Mulla Abd Allah, instigator of the Khost rebellion

On March 28, the Minister was informed by S. Muhammad Wali that the rebellion had "subsided", but the statement was clearly incorrect; and the movement gradually grew in strength until, by August, the capital itself was threatened.

By mid-April, the entire Southern Province had begun participating in the rebellion, and it then became vital for the Afghan Government, in order to localise the outbreak, and especially to prevent it spreading southwards to Ghazni, to ensure the loyalty of the Ghilzai tribes. For this purpose, Ghaus-ud-Din, son of Jehandad Khan, the famous Ghilzai Chief who rebelled in 1912, was summoned to Kabul, and, although a Government which executed his father must have had some qualms as to his loyalty, he was induced to detach the Ahmedzai Ghilzais by remiding them of the Mangals’ previous treachery towards them. In these discussions he was supported by two influential officials — Mahomet Ibrahim and Mahomet Usman Khan — who had been sent from Kabul for this purpose.

That same month, forces loyal to King Amanullah managed to defeat the Rebels, but could not rout them. The Rebels were then joined by the Alikhel and Sulaimankhel tribes. On 22 April, the rebels successfully ambushed a government regiment at Altimur Pass, which is the natural entrance to Khost from the direction of Kabul, inflicting severe casualties while suffering 20 deaths. By this time the garrisons of the Afghan outposts in Khost had either surrendered or been driven into the central forts of Gardez and Matun, which were then loosely invested. The garrison of the Afghan post of Gurgurai took refuge at Lakka Tiga on the British side of the line, and later were permitted to recross with their arms into Afghan territory.

=== The war under Mahomet Wali Khan; siege of Matun lifted (April–May 1924) ===
On 23 April, Sardar Mahomet Wali Khan left Kabul to take over command in the field.

On 27 April, a battle near Gardez saw the rebels suffer 60 casualties against 7 government deaths and 27 government wounded. By this success, Sardar Mahomet Wali, meeting with only nominal resistance, was enabled on 1 May to force the Altimur Pass, and to reopen communications between Kabul and Gardez.

These successes appear to have disheartened the rebels, who on the approach of the Eid al-Fitr (6 May), dispersed to their homes.

As resistance increased, the Afghan government sent a delegation to the rebels, arguing that Amanullah's reforms had not been in conflict with the Sharia, but these negotiations proved fruitless. Further fighting took place in May, when the government claimed to kill 117 rebels and wound another 365 more, for the cost of only 17 government deaths and 27 wounded, although these figures were regarded as unreliable by foreign observers.

On 30 April, two sons of ex-Amir Yaqub Khan, Sardars Abdur Rahman Khan and Abdullah Khan, were arrested in Parachinar. They were dressed as Ghilzai traders and were attempting to cross into Afghanistan, evidently in order to put themselves at the head of the insurrection. About this time, a deputation of Mangal Maliks waited on the Political Agent Kurram and asked for assistance or asylum from the Government of India. Their requests were refused.

Mahomet Ibrahim and Mahomet Usman had by now been recalled to Kabul where they were regarded as having been superseded by Sardar Mahomet Wali.

It was prematurely announced in India that the end of insurrection was in sight, whereas in reality the Eid al-Fitr dispersal marked the close of only its first phase. The second opened some ten days later with a concentration against Matun.

On 22 May, the Matun fort was attacked and indecisive fighting continued for the next few days. On the 29th, the siege was raised, the withdrawal of the rebels being ascribed to bribery from Kabul. This may have been the case, but there is at least a possibility that their change of plan was dictated by a realisation that the true objective was Mahomet Wali’s army, upon the decisive defeat of which the fall of Matun would sooner or later follow automatically. Meanwhile, hostilities had broken out at Mirzakka, to the north-east of Gardez, and an advance by the Government forces, intended apparently to re-open communications with Ali Khel, was repulsed with some loss on 22nd.

=== The Loya Jirga (June 1924) ===
The period of military inactivity which followed was spent in negotiations between Mullah Abdullah, the principal rebel leader, on the one side, and Sardar Mahomet Wali and the official Mullahs on the other. A report that the Amir had offered to suspend the operation of certain articles of the Fundamental Code gave ground for hope that a settlement was in prospect.

King Amanullah summoned an assembly of around 1000 tribal and religious leaders, a loya jirga, which he hoped would help legitimize his policies and therefore counter Mulla's religious claims. To his surprise, the majority of Ulama attending the assembly demanded the nullification of the reforms, which led Amanullah reluctantly withdraw some of his policies and begin negotiations in early June. On 20 June, peace talks broke down, and fighting resumed on the 24th.

=== Rise of Abd-al Karim (July–August 1924) ===
During the first half of July little definite news was received regarding operations in the field. According to persistent rumour, however, disaffection was spreading gradually among the Ghilzais, of whom the Suleman Khel, the Sultan Khel, the Isa Khel and Ahmedzai were reported to have become more or less involved in the rebellion. The outbreak of fighting in the Kattawaz area, and the despatch of reinforcements in the direction of Ghazni, advertised the failure of the Government to localise the outbreak in the Southern Province, On the approach of the Eid al-Adha (July 13), there was apparently a slight lull on which, however, the Afghan War Ministry built no hopes. Their apprehensions were immediately justified, by the collision, which occurred on the day of the Eid itself, between the Sultan Khel Ghilzais and one of the "Model" (Qita Namuna) battalions.

The details of this operation have not been ascertained, but, whether through treachery or otherwise, the battalion engaged lost some 250 men and was withdrawn to Kabul.

Habibullāh Kalakāni, future king of Afghanistan, also fought in the conflict. At the time, he served with the Model battalion and served with distinction. Nevertheless, he deserted the unit at some unspecified time, and after working in Peshawar moved to Parachinar (on the Afghan border) where he was arrested and sentenced to eleven months imprisonment.

A second battalion of the same brigade, which apparently refused to serve beyond the three months for which it had originally been ordered on service, was recalled at the same time. Their success in putting out of action two of the best regiments of the Afghan regular army appears to have raised the morale of the rebels, as much as it lowered that of the city population. The Amir, however, still clung to his plan of conciliating the insurgents by an ostentatious acceptance of the resolutions of the Great Assembly, which was to meet on July 16.

At this juncture, Abd-al Karim, the son of an ex-king of Afghanistan who was forced into exile in 1879, crossed from British India into Afghanistan to assume leadership of the rebellion and contest the throne of Afghanistan. Senzil Nawid (1996) writes that Abd-al Karim became the leader of the revolt, while Mulla Abd Allawas reduced to an advisory role. However, according Richard Roy Maconachie (1928), Abd-al Karim was only a figurehead used by the Mullahs who really led the rebellion.

A battle on 13 July saw the Royal army lose 250 troops. A small government force was wiped out at Bedak on 2 August, and a larger force was destroyed soon after.

At the end of July, a mixed body of Mangals, Zadrans and Ahmedzais cut the communications between Gardez and Kabul, and advanced into the southern end of the Logar valley. Abdul Hamid, Chief of the Staff was sent from Kabul to open the Altimur Pass. He apparently pushed forward in advance of his main body with some guns and a small escort, marched his men to a standstill at Bedak and put out piquets for the night. These at once went to sleep, and the whole party was annihilated before dawn the next day (2 August ), by the rebel force; Abdul Hamid himself being killed, and the guns lost. The Altimur pass was recaptured by rebels that same day.

Flushed with this success, the tribesmen pushed on to attack the main body and cut the Sar Nigahban regiment (aka Lifeguards) to pieces at Pathkai. The news of these reverses threw Kabul into a panic, which was increased by the hurried despatch of raw conscripts in motor lorries to Hisarak, and the arrival some days later of the remnant of the Sar Nigahban regiment, mostly suffering axe wounds. Certain quarters of the city were prepared for defence, and the wildest rumours were prevalent.

=== Height of the rebellion and holy war (August 1924) ===
No one with whom I have discussed the local situation, as it existed from the 2nd to the 27th August, considers that during that period there was anything to prevent 5,000 well armed tribesmen from sacking Kabul; in fact, my German colleague, whose nerve is beyond suspicion, put the required figure at 700! If Abdul Karim had pushed on immediately to Kabul after cutting up the Sar Nigahban regiment on August 4th, he would have met with no serious resistance, since the city was denuded of troops, while the civilian morale was deplorable. Men were hurried out to the Logar as soon as they could be equipped, and the strength of the garrison consequently varied from day to day, but it is believed to have frequently been below 500. Or if, as the Sheikhabad raid appeared to show was the case, Abdul Karim had decided to cut the main communications between Kabul and the rest of the country as a preliminary to an attack on the city, he would have had every chance of success. The event proved, however, that he had no plans, but was merely indulging in isolated raids which, though invariably successful, could not be decisive.

— Richard Roy Maconachie, A Precis On Afghan Affairs

The disasters at Bedak and Patkhai, however, finally awoke the Amir to a realisation that his position was really critical, and that the time had come to put forth his whole strength Emissaries were sent to raise the Khugianis, Mohmands, Shinwaris, Wazirs, and Hazaras, for a combined offensive on Khost from all quarters of the compass. The regular Afghan troops were henceforward used mainly to hold the approaches to Kabul, until the tribes could launch their attack. Sardar Ali Ahmad Khan, the chief delegate at the Rawalpindi Conference, was appointed to the Eastern Province as Naib-ul-Hukuma, and, by a lavish expenditure of money, at once succeeded in collecting considerable levies from Kunar and the districts surrounding Jalalabad. He rallied the Khogyani and Shinwari to help quell the rebellion. On 11 August, war was officially declared against the Mangals.

In Autumn 1924, the rebellion reached its height.

On 11 August 1924, King Amanullah declared holy war against the Rebels. The energy shown by the Amir, and vigorous official propaganda to the effect that Ghulam Nabi had reopened the Altimur Pass partially reassured the bazar, which. however, relapsed into a panic on the sudden return of the Amir, and all the Ministries from Paghman on 13 August, The annual Festival of Independence had been fixed for the following day, and the fact that the celebrations were abandoned at 24 hours' notice increased the general alarm.

On 13 August, the rebels captured Logar’s “military fort,” likely near Puli Alam, and assaulted Waghjan gorge.

In mid-August, rebel forces launched an attack on the city of Ghazni. They subsequently advanced northward to Sheikhabad and Takia in the Wardak region, located southwest of Kabul, where they looted local government funds. They were later defeated. Meanwhile, rebel activity was also reported further east, where they captured Hesarak.

For some time past, there had been rumours that the Suleman Khel were preparing a picked body of 300 men to raid Paghman, and capture the Amir, and a minor raid had actually taken place near the Palace. It was generally conjectured, however, that the true reason was to be found in some threat to the Ghazni road, and consequently to the communications between Paghman and Kabul. Confirmation was received of this view on 15 August, when it was learnt that a body of Suleman Khels, reported as being 4,000 strong, were astride the Ghazni road and in occupation of Sheikhabad, 40 miles from Kabul. Fears were entertained that the populous Wardak district, in which Sher Ali's name still carried weight, would join the rebels, and that communications with Ghazni would be permanently cut in consequence.

On 14 August, a council of Mullahs was summoned to consider the declaration of a "Holy War" against the rebels; this, after considerable discussion, was eventually proclaimed. The legality of this step was apparently regarded as doubtful, and no religious enthusiasm for the war is noticeable in Kabul.

By 16 August, Ghaus-ud-din, the Ahmedzai chief, had allegedly joined the rebels with a party of his tribesmen, who had recently received government rifles. Doubts were soon raised, however, as to the reality of Ghaus-ud-din ’s defection, and on 17 September, Sardar Sher Ahmed told Richard Roy Maconachie that it had been arranged by the Government, adding that Ghaus-ud-din himself had come into Kabul that day, and was being received in audience by the Amir.

The "most daring" raid was carried out on 23 August, at Tang-i-Waghjan, 28 miles from Kabul on the Logar road. Two strong Government piquets were wiped out by the usual night attack, and the rebels occupied the road, thus cutting off S. Shah Wall’s force from Kabul, until the evening of the 26th, when, after considerable fighting, they were driven off. Before their retreat, they sacked a field hospital at Shikar Kila, killing some of the attendants, and carrying off the scanty stock of medical stores and dressings.

The Suleman Khels from Sheikhabad, instead of moving on Kabul, turned southwards to Ghazni, where, after some desultory fighting, they were eventually repulsed by the local garrison, aided by Hazara auxiliaries.

=== Debut of the Afghan air force and government resurgence (August–December 1924) ===
On 22 August, two British airplanes reached Kabul and were purchased by the Amir. On 27 August, Herr Weisz flew one of these to Hisarak. His unexpected appearance there is credibly reported to have broken up a rebel concentration, which was preparing for an attack on the Government forces, and it can scarcely be an accident that after this date the rebels made no further advance, while their morale gradually deteriorated. This marked the first combat operation of the nascent Afghan Air Force. Louis Dupree assesses the introduction of air power as the turning point of the conflict, stating that it had "a salutory effect on tribal forces when they appeared on the scene, bombing and strafing the rebels."

On 25 August, rebel forces successfully attacked Kulangar, where they destroyed 2 government battalions. Heavy fighting also took place in the Southern Province from 23 to 26 August, and 4 days later 1500 troops under Mir Zamer Khan defected to the government.

As of late August/early September, Gardez remained under siege.

On 2 September, the rebels in the Logar sent messages to Shah Wali requesting a truce. The next day, Weisz, during a flight over the Hisarak and Wardak areas, dropped leaflets calling on the rebels to surrender before severer measures were taken against them. It is significant that on the back of these leaflets were printed details of the organisation of the Great Assembly. The rebels' request for a truce was recognised by the Government as actuated by a desire to gain time. Time, however, was just what the Government also required, and no effort was therefore made by the latter to bring the discussions to a close. In the ensuing weeks, thousands of recruits flowed from Kohistan and the Hazarajat to Kabul. The truce lasted intermittently until 16 September, when hostilities were resumed by an attack on the Kunari contingent under Mir Zamer Khan. This was finally repulsed by mid-day on 17 September With a loss to the rebels amounting, according to reliable information, to between 400-500 hundred killed. In contrast, Zamer Khan lost 100 of his own men. The Kunaris, to everyone’s surprise, appeared to have fought with great determination. It is probable however that by this time the Ahmedzais had ceased to take an active part in the rebel operations, possibly due to this defeat.

By the third week of September, (Note: In Afghanistan, the third week of September 1924 started on 13 September (Sa) and ended on 19 September (Fr).) news had been received of the advance of Shinwaris and Afridis from the Eastern Province and of Wazirs from the neighbourhood of the British frontier.

From 18 to 21 September, the government engaged a rebel force of 3,000 consisting of Sulaimankhel, Mangal and Zadran tribesmen. The Altimur Pass is stated to have been recaptured on 25 September, and simultaneously a considerable success seems to have been gained by the Afridi force from Jalalabad. The arrival of tribal reinforcements at Pir Serai has enabled the Government forces, so long inactive, in the Chakmanni district to advance southwards for the relief of Matun. They were believed to have reached Maidan Khula by February 1925.

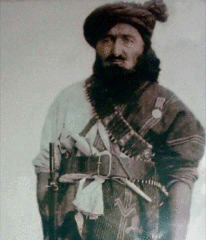
Babrak Khan died fighting rebels in October 1924.

The period of October 1924 to February 1925 was one of protracted negotiation between individual tribes on the one side, and individual Afghan generals on the other. The only active operations that have marked this period were a few isolated raids by Zadrans, in which Afghan regular troops were defeated, and suffered considerable loss in men, weapons, and treasure.

The Mangal tribe of Khost made terms early in October, partly owing to the lavish distribution of blackmail by Afghan commanders, and partly owing to annual winter migration. Some of these tribesmen have fled to their cousins in 'the Kurram Valley to escape from the punishment which they expected to receive, in spite of the lenient terms nominally awarded them.

On 22 October, it was reported that the loyalist Zadran chieftain, Babrak Khan, had "recently" died while fighting over the village of Bak. He was succeeded as chieftain by his son, Mazrak.

By November, the rebels were forced out of Hesarak and away from Ghazni.

On 9–10 November, a raid by 500-600 rebel troops succeeded at inflicting 50-65 government casualties.

The Zadrans, by whom Abd-al Karim, the Pretender, and the Lame Mullah were being harboured, continued the struggle until the middle of December, and avoided submission by playing off one Afghan General against another, each commander being anxious to secure for himself the whole credit for bringing this stubborn tribe to terms. On 20 December, the Zadran went to Kabul to agree to peace terms. The Zadran leaders ultimately agreed to accept the guarantee of safe conduct given to them by Mir Zaman, who was in command of the tribal levies of Kunar, and were induced to come into Kabul with this Pathan chieftain, to negotiate a settlement with the Amir Shortly after the return of the Zadrans to their homes, Abd-al Karim was arrested in India, whither, according to his own account, he had fled through Tirah some weeks before; and on January 30 the lame Mullah was brought into Kabul under an escort of household cavalry

=== Quelling of the rebellion (1925) ===
As the rebellion progressed, official intrigues and bribery began to sow disunion among the rebels, who were further discouraged by the arrival in Kabul of two British aeroplanes sold to the Afghan Government.

Most historical accounts place the defeat of the rebellion in January 1925. In this version, the rebellion was finally quelled on 30 January 1925 with the imprisonment of 40 Rebel leaders. On 25 May 1925, the Rebel leaders including Mulla Abd Allah, his 3 sons and his son-in-law and co-leader Mullah Abdul Rashid were executed by firing squad at Tepe Maranjan, then known as Siahsang in front of a large observing crowd. Mulla Abd Allah was buried near Mehlan, in Gardez district of Paktia province.

Some historical accounts, including contemporary reports, contradict the notion of the rebellion ending in January 1925, placing the end of the revolt a few months earlier or later:

- Emil Trinkler, a contemporary German explorer, wrote in Through the heart of Afghanistan (1927) that the rebellion was defeated "towards the end of the year" in 1924. Sara Haroon repeated this claim in Frontier of Faith (2011).
- A Guide to Intra-state Wars (2015) makes no mention of the execution of rebel leaders in January 1925 and instead says that the government started a new offensive in February 1925 after the failure of peace talks in December, and then goes on to conclude that the rebellion had been crushed by March 1925.
- A British despatch dated to 12 February 1925 stated that, though the rebellion was still active at the time, it "shows every sign of collapse in the near future".
- In a report written in May 1925, Francis Humphrys states that the rebellion had been defeated, adding: "On the 30th March a full parade was held, at which the Ameer made a speech of thanks for the good services rendered by the troops and lives, and announced that he had delegated to the Shahgassi the work of paying off and dismissing the tribesmen."

Abd-al Karim evaded capture and fled back into the British Raj. Tom Lansford attributes the defeat of the rebels to the Royal Army's superior weapons and training.

== Aftermath ==
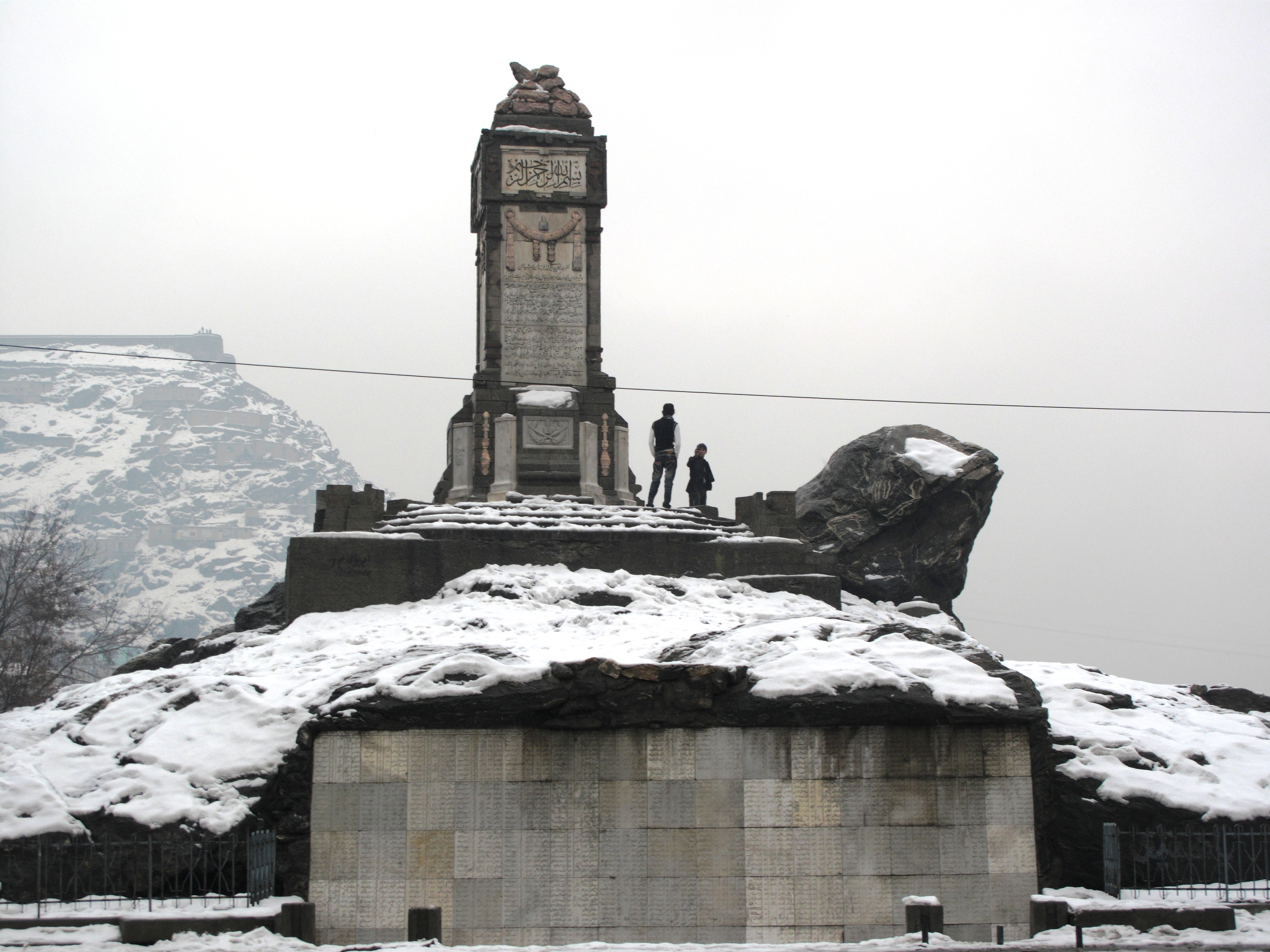
The Minar-e-Elm-wa-Jahil (Minaret of Knowledge and Ignorance, also known as the Khost monument) in 2009.

Over the course of the rebellion, which Fayz Muhammad described as being suppressed "only with great difficulty", 14,000 people had perished, and the Afghan government lost £5 million in state revenue. Although unsuccessful, it succeeded in delaying many of the king's reforms until 1928.

According to Waseem Raja, "The Khost Rebellion was important for two reasons. First it revealed the weaknesses of the Afghan army which remained poorly trained, underpaid and sadly lacking in medical facilities. Furthermore there was increasing discontent among the older officers many of whom had been superseded by younger European educated men. They deeply resented the fact that various modernization schemes had depleted the Amir's meagre financial resources at the expenses of the army. The revolt started the disunity in the country, the deterioration of administration, especially in the provinces and to check the disorderly progress of development in Afghanistan. Amanullah's dependence on the tribe to put down the rebellion only increased their already considerable power."

The defeat of the Khost rebellion was followed by reprisals on the Mangal population. 1515 men were executed, 600 women were dragged off to Kabul, and 3000 houses were burnt and razed to the ground. In the central square of Kabul, the Khost Monument was built, celebrating the "triumph of knowledge over ignorance". The monument sustained some damage during the civil wars of the 1990s but was later rebuilt. In 2022 and 2023, Kabuli passers-by were asked about the monument's origin; most believed that it related to the Third Anglo-Afghan War or the 1928-1929 civil war. Only one passer-by correctly identified the monument with the Khost rebellion.

== Britain's role ==
During the rebellion, the Afghan government portrayed rebel leaders as traitors seeking to serve British interests, and that the campaigns against the rebels were undertaken in the defense of Afghanistan against British influence. In British Raj however, it was generally suspected that the Soviet Union was responsible for providing financial and military aid to the rebels, while in the Soviet Union, the blame was put on Britain. Senzil Nawid writes that despite claims of British involvement by Afghan historians and the contemporary Afghan press, "neither the press reports nor Afghan historians have provided corroborating evidence for this theory".

In A Precis On Afghan Affairs (1928), Richard Roy Maconachie, writing in his capacity as a civil servant for the British Raj, reported that Britain supplied Afghan forces with barbed wire, medicine, two airplanes (on payment), 30 Lewis guns (on payment), and 3000 rifles with ammunition (on payment). He noted that, though the Afghan government accepted military support from the British empire, the portrayal of rebels as British assets was indispensable for the government's propaganda effort.

== See also ==
- Khost rebellion (1912), prior uprising in Khost
- Alizai rebellion of 1923, uprising that began less than a year before the Khost rebellion
- Afghan Civil War (1928–1929)
