= Afghanistan–United Kingdom relations =

Bilateral relations between Afghanistan and UK

- Afghanistan: United Kingdom

Bilateral relations of Afghanistan and the United Kingdom of Great Britain and Northern Ireland span a long and eventful history, dating back to the United Kingdom's Company rule in India, the British-Russian rivalry in Central Asia, and the border between modern Afghanistan and British India. There was an Afghan embassy in London from 1922 until 2024, though there was no accredited Afghan ambassador from 1981 to 2001.

== History ==
=== The Great Game (1800–1839) ===
The 19th century was a period of diplomatic competition between the British and Russian empires for spheres of influence in Asia known as the "Great Game" to the British and the "Tournament of Shadows" to the Russians. With the exception of Emperor Paul who ordered an invasion of India in 1800 (which was cancelled after his assassination in 1801), no Russian tsar ever seriously considered invading India, but for most of the 19th century, Russia was viewed as "the enemy" in Britain; and any Russian advancement into Central Asia was always assumed (in London) to be directed towards the conquest of India, as the American historian David Fromkin observed, "no matter how far-fetched" such an interpretation might be.

In 1832, the First Reform Bill lowering the franchise requirements to vote and hold office in Britain was passed, which the ultra-conservative Emperor Nicholas I of Russia openly disapproved of, setting the stage for an Anglo-Russian "cold war", with many believing that Russian autocracy and British democracy were bound to clash. In 1837, Lord Palmerston and John Hobhouse, fearing the instability of Afghanistan, the Sindh, and the increasing power of the Sikh kingdom to the northwest, raised the spectre of a possible Russian invasion of British India through Afghanistan. The Russian Empire was slowly extending its domain into Central Asia, and this was seen by the East India Company as a possible threat to their interests in India. In 19th century Russia, there was the ideology of Russia's "special mission in the East", namely Russia had the "duty" to conquer much of Asia, though this was more directed against the nations of Central Asia and the alleged "Yellow Peril" of China than India. The British tended to misunderstand the foreign policy of the Emperor Nicholas I as anti-British and intent upon an expansionary policy in Asia; whereas in fact though Nicholas disliked Britain as a liberal democratic state that he considered to be rather "strange", he always believed it was possible to reach an understanding with Britain on spheres of influence in Asia, believing that the essentially conservative nature of British society would retard the advent of liberalism. The main goal of Nicholas's foreign policy was not the conquest of Asia, but rather upholding the status quo in Europe, especially by co-operating with Prussia and Austria, and in isolating France, as Louis Philippe I, the King of the French was a man who Nicholas hated as an "usurper". The duc d'Orleans had once been Nicholas's friend, but when he assumed the throne of France after the revolution of 1830, Nicholas was consumed with hatred for his former friend who, as he saw it, had gone over to what he perceived as the dark side of liberalism.

The Company sent an envoy to Kabul to form an alliance with Afghanistan's emir, Dost Mohammad Khan, against Russia. Dost Mohammad had recently lost Afghanistan's second capital of Peshawar to the Sikh Empire and was willing to form an alliance with Britain if they gave support to retake it, but the British were unwilling. Instead, the British feared the French-trained Dal Khalsa, and they considered the Sikh army to be a far more formidable threat than the Afghans who did not have an army at all, instead having only a tribal levy where under the banner of jihad tribesmen would come out to fight for the emir. The Dal Khalsa was an enormous force that had been trained by French officers, was equipped with modern weapons and was widely considered to be one of the most powerful armies on the entire Indian subcontinent. For this reason, Lord Auckland preferred an alliance with the Punjab over an alliance with Afghanistan, which had nothing equivalent to the Dal Khalsa. The British could have had an alliance with the Punjab or Afghanistan, but not both at the same time. When Governor-General of India Lord Auckland heard about the arrival of Russian envoy Count Jan Prosper Witkiewicz (better known by the Russian version of his name, Yan Vitkevich) in Kabul and the possibility that Dost Mohammad might turn to Russia for support, his political advisers exaggerated the threat. Burnes described Witkiewicz: "He was a gentlemanly and agreeable man, of about thirty years of age, spoke French, Turkish and Persian fluently, and wore the uniform of an officer of the Cossacks". The presence of Witkiewicz had thrown Burnes into a state of despair, leading one contemporary to note that he "abandoned himself to despair, bound his head with wet towels and handkerchiefs and took to the smelling bottle". Dost Mohammad had in fact invited Count Witkiewicz to Kabul as a way to frighten the British into making an alliance with him against his archenemy Ranjit Singh, the Maharaja of the Punjab, not because he really wanted an alliance with Russia. The British had the power to compel Singh to return the former Afghan territories he had conquered whereas the Russians did not, which explains why Dost Mohammad Khan wanted an alliance with the British.

Alexander Burnes, the Scotsman who served as the East India Company's chief political officer in Afghanistan wrote home after having dinner with Count Witkiewicz and Dost Mohammad in late December 1837: "We are in a mess home. The emperor of Russia has sent an envoy to Kabul to offer...money [to the Afghans] to fight Rajeet Singh!!! I could not believe my own eyes or ears." On 20 January 1838, Lord Auckland sent an ultimatum to Dost Mohammad telling him: "You must desist from all correspondence with Russia. You must never receive agents from them, or have aught to do with them without our sanction; you must dismiss Captain Viktevitch [Witkiewicz] with courtesy; you must surrender all claims to Peshawar". Burnes himself had complained that Lord Auckland's letter was "so dictatorial and supercilious as to indicate the writer's intention that it should give offense", and tried to avoid delivering it for long as possible. Dost Mohammad was indeed offended by the letter, but in order to avoid a war, he had his special military advisor, the American adventurer Josiah Harlan engage in talks with Burnes to see if some compromise could be arranged. Burnes in fact had no power to negotiate anything, and Harlan complained that Burnes was just stalling, which led to Dost Mohammad expelling the British diplomatic mission on 26 April 1838.

British fears of a Russian invasion of India took one step closer to becoming a reality when negotiations between the Afghans and Russians broke down in 1838. The Qajar dynasty of Persia, with Russian support, attempted the Siege of Herat. Herat is a city that had historically belonged to Persia that the Qajar shahs had long desired to take back. It is located in a plain so fertile that is known as the "Granary of Central Asia"—whoever controls Herat and the surrounding countryside also controls the largest source of grain in all of Central Asia. Russia, wanting to increase its presence in Central Asia, had formed an alliance with Qajar Persia, which had territorial disputes with Afghanistan as Herat had been part of the Safavid Persia before 1709. Lord Auckland's plan was to drive away the besiegers and replace Dost Mohammad with Shuja Shah Durrani, who had once ruled Afghanistan and who was willing to ally himself with anyone who might restore him to the Afghan throne. At one point, Shuja had hired an American adventurer named Josiah Harlan to overthrow Dost Mohammad Khan, despite the fact Harlan's military experience comprised only working as a surgeon with the East India Company's troops in First Burma War. Shuja Shah had been deposed in 1809 and been living in exile in British India since 1818, collecting a pension from the East India Company because they believed that he might be useful one day. The British denied that they were invading Afghanistan, claiming they were merely supporting its "legitimate" Shuja government "against foreign interference and factious opposition". Shuja Shah was barely remembered by most of his former subjects by 1838, and those that did remember viewed him as a cruel, tyrannical ruler who, as the British were soon to learn, had almost no popular support in Afghanistan.

On 1 October 1838, Lord Auckland issued the Simla Declaration, attacking Dost Mohammed Khan for making "an unprovoked attack" on the empire of "our ancient ally, Maharaja Ranjeet Singh". Auckland went on to declare that Suja Shah was "popular throughout Afghanistan" and would enter his former realm "surrounded by his own troops and [...] supported against foreign interference and factious opposition by the British Army". As the Persians had broken off the siege of Herat and the Emperor Nicholas I of Russia had ordered Count Vitkevich home (he would commit suicide upon reaching St. Petersburg), the reasons for attempting to put Shuja Shah back on the Afghan throne had vanished. The British historian Sir John William Kaye wrote that the failure of the Persians to take Herat "cut from under the feet of Lord Auckland all ground of justification and rendered the expedition across the Indus at once a folly and a crime". Still, at this point Auckland was committed to putting Afghanistan into the British sphere of influence, and nothing would stop him from going ahead with the invasion.

On 25 November 1838, the two most powerful armies on the Indian subcontinent assembled in a grand review at Ferozepore as Ranjit Singh, the Maharajah of the Punjab brought out the Dal Khalsa to march alongside the sepoy troops of the East India Company and the British troops in India. Lord Auckland himself was present, amid much colorful pageantry and music as men dressed in brightly colored uniforms together with horses and elephants marched in an impressive demonstration of military might. Lord Auckland declared that the "Grand Army of the Indus" would now start the march on Kabul to depose Dost Mohammed and put Shuja Shah back on the Afghan throne, ostensibly because the latter was the rightful emir, but in reality to place Afghanistan into the British sphere of influence. The Duke of Wellington speaking in the House of Lords condemned the invasion, saying that the real difficulties would only begin after the invasion's success. He predicted that the Anglo-Indian force would rout the Afghan tribal levy, but then find themselves struggling to hold on due to the terrain of the Hindu Kush mountains and the fact that Afghanistan had no modern roads. He called the entire operation "stupid", given that Afghanistan was a land of "rocks, sands, deserts, ice and snow".

=== First Anglo-Afghan War (1839–1842) ===
The First Anglo-Afghan War (Pashto: د برتانیه افغانستان جنګ, also known by the British as the Disaster in Afghanistan) was fought between the British East India Company and the Emirate of Afghanistan from 1839 to 1842. Initially, the British successfully intervened in a succession dispute between emir Dost Mohammad (Barakzai) and former emir Shah Shujah (Durrani), whom they installed upon conquering Kabul in August 1839. The main British Indian and Sikh force occupying Kabul along with their camp followers, having endured harsh winters as well, was almost completely annihilated while retreating in January 1842. The British then sent an Army of Retribution to Kabul to avenge their defeat, and having demolished parts of the capital and recovered prisoners they left Afghanistan altogether by the end of the year. Dost Mohamed returned from exile in India to resume his rule.

=== Treaty of Peshawar and buildup to the second war (1839–1878) ===
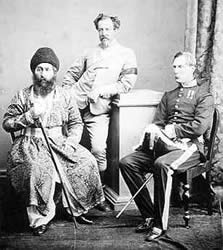
King Sher Ali Khan with CD Charles Chamberlain and Sir Richard F. Pollock in 1869

After months of chaos in Kabul, Mohammad Akbar Khan secured local control and in April 1843 his father Dost Mohammad, who had been released by the British, returned to the throne in Afghanistan. In the following decade, Dost Mohammad concentrated his efforts on reconquering Mazari Sharif, Konduz, Badakhshan, and Kandahar. Mohammad Akbar Khan died in 1845. During the Second Anglo-Sikh War (1848–1849), Dost Mohammad occupied Peshawar and Attock, but withdrew after the Sikhs capitulated to the British.

By 1854, the British wanted to resume relations with Dost Mohammad, whom they had essentially ignored in the intervening twelve years. The 1855 Treaty of Peshawar reopened diplomatic relations, proclaimed respect for each side's territorial integrity, and pledged both sides as friends of each other's friends and enemies of each other's enemies.

In 1857 an addendum to the 1855 treaty permitted a British military mission to become a presence in Kandahar (but not Kabul) during a conflict with the Persians, who had attacked Herat in 1856. During the Indian Rebellion of 1857, some British officials suggested restoring Peshawar to Dost Mohammad, in return for his support against the rebellious sepoys of the Bengal Army, but this view was rejected by British political officers on the North West frontier, who believed that Dost Mohammad would see this as a sign of weakness and turn against the British.

In 1863 Dost Mohammad retook Herat with British acquiescence. A few weeks later, he died. Sher Ali Khan, his third son, and proclaimed successor, failed to recapture Kabul from his older brother, Mohammad Afzal (whose troops were led by his son, Abdur Rahman) until 1868, after which Abdur Rahman retreated across the Amu Darya and bided his time.

In the years immediately following the First Anglo-Afghan War, and especially after the Indian rebellion of 1857 against the British in India, Liberal Party governments in London took a political view of Afghanistan as a buffer state. By the time Sher Ali had established control in Kabul in 1868, he found the British ready to support his regime with arms and funds, but nothing more. Over the next ten years, relations between the Afghan ruler and Britain deteriorated steadily. The Afghan ruler was worried about the southward encroachment of Russia, which by 1873 had taken over the lands of the khan, or ruler, of Khiva. Sher Ali sent an envoy seeking British advice and support. The previous year the British had signed an agreement with the Russians in which the latter agreed to respect the northern boundaries of Afghanistan and to view the territories of the Afghan emir as outside their sphere of influence. The British, however, refused to give any assurances to the disappointed Sher Ali.

=== Second Anglo-Afghan War (1878–1880) ===
The Second Anglo-Afghan War (Pashto: د افغان-انګرېز دويمه جګړه) was a military conflict fought between the British Raj and the Emirate of Afghanistan from 1878 to 1880, when the latter was ruled by Sher Ali Khan of the Barakzai dynasty, the son of former emir Dost Mohammad Khan. The war was part of the Great Game between the British and Russian empires.

After tension between Russia and Britain in Europe ended with the June 1878 Congress of Berlin, Russia turned its attention to Central Asia. That same summer, Russia sent an uninvited diplomatic mission to Kabul. Sher Ali Khan, the emir of Afghanistan, tried unsuccessfully to keep them out. Russian envoys arrived in Kabul on 22 July 1878, and on 14 August, the British demanded that Sher Ali accept a British mission too.

The emir not only refused to receive a British mission under Neville Bowles Chamberlain, but threatened to stop it if it were dispatched. Lord Lytton, the viceroy of India, ordered a diplomatic mission to set out for Kabul in September 1878 but the mission was turned back as it approached the eastern entrance of the Khyber Pass, triggering the Second Anglo-Afghan War.

The war was split into two campaigns – the first began in November 1878 with the British invasion of Afghanistan. The British were quickly victorious and forced the emir, Sher Ali Khan, to flee. Ali's successor Mohammad Yaqub Khan immediately sued for peace and the Treaty of Gandamak was then signed on 26 May 1879. The British sent an envoy and mission led by Sir Louis Cavagnari to Kabul, but on 3 September this mission was massacred and the conflict was reignited by Ayub Khan which led to the abdication of Yaqub.

The second campaign ended in September 1880 when the British decisively defeated Ayub Khan outside Kandahar. A new emir selected by the British, Abdur Rahman Khan, ratified and confirmed the Gandamak treaty once more. When the British and Indian soldiers had withdrawn, the Afghans agreed to let the British attain all of their geopolitical objectives, as well as create a buffer between the British Raj and the Russian Empire.

=== 40 years of good relations (1880–1919) ===
The end of the Second Afghan War in 1880 marked the beginning of almost 40 years of good relations between Britain and Afghanistan under the leadership of Abdur Rahman Khan and Habibullah Khan, during which time the British attempted to manage Afghan foreign policy through the payment of a large subsidy. While ostensibly the country remained independent, under the Treaty of Gandumak (1879) it accepted that in external matters it would "...have no windows looking on the outside world, except towards India".

The death in 1901 of emir Abdur Rahman Khan led indirectly to the war that began 18 years later. His successor, Habibullah, was a pragmatic leader who sided with Britain or Russia, depending on Afghan interests. Despite considerable resentment over not being consulted over the Anglo-Russian Convention of 1907 (Convention of St. Petersburg), Afghanistan remained neutral during the First World War (1914–1918), resisting considerable pressure from the Ottoman Empire when it entered the conflict on the side of Imperial Germany and the sultan (as titular leader of Islam) called for a holy war against the Allies.

Despite remaining neutral in the conflict, Habibullah did in fact accept a Turkish-German mission in Kabul and military assistance from the Central Powers as he attempted to play both sides of the conflict for the best deal. Through continual prevarication, he resisted numerous requests for assistance from the Central Powers, but failed to keep in check troublesome tribal leaders, intent on undermining British rule in India, as Turkish agents attempted to foment trouble along the frontier. The departure of a large part of the British Indian Army to fight overseas and news of British defeats at the hands of the Turks aided Turkish agents in efforts at sedition, and in 1915 there was unrest amongst the Mohmands and then the Mahsuds. Not withstanding these outbreaks, the frontier generally remained settled at a time when Britain could ill afford trouble.

A Turco-German mission left Kabul in 1916. By that time, however, it had successfully convinced Habibullah that Afghanistan was an independent nation and that it should be beholden to no one. With the end of the First World War, Habibullah sought to obtain reward from the British government for his assistance during the war. Looking for British recognition of Afghanistan's independence in foreign affairs, he demanded a seat at the Versailles Peace Conference in 1919. This request was denied by the Viceroy, Frederic Thesiger, 1st Viscount Chelmsford, on the grounds that attendance at the conference was confined to the belligerents. Further negotiations were scheduled, but before they could begin Habibullah was assassinated on 19 February 1919.

This resulted in a power struggle, as Habibullah's brother Nasrullah Khan proclaimed himself as Habibullah's successor, while Amanullah, Habibullah's third son, had also proclaimed himself emir. The Afghan army suspected Amanullah's complicity in the death of his father. Needing a way of cementing his power, upon seizing the throne in April 1919 Amanullah posed as a man of democratic ideals, promising reforms in the system of government. He stated that there should be no forced labour, tyranny or oppression, and that Afghanistan should be free and independent and no longer bound by the Treaty of Gandamak.

Amanullah had his uncle Nasrullah arrested for Habibullah's murder and had him sentenced to life imprisonment. Nasrullah had been the leader of a more conservative element in Afghanistan and his treatment rendered Amanullah's position as emir somewhat tenuous. By April 1919 he realised that if he could not find a way to placate the conservatives, he would be unlikely to maintain his hold on power. Looking for a diversion from the internal strife in the Afghan court and sensing advantage in the rising civil unrest in India following the Amritsar massacre, (Note: Following a similar trend to what was happening in Afghanistan, there had been a rising nationalist movement in India at the same time, culminating in riots and disorder in Punjab. On 13 April 1919, Dyer learnt that a large political meeting was taking place at the Jallianwala Bagh, an enclosed area in Amritsar. Fearing that the agitators would incite the crowd to violence and murder and that he had a very small force to protect the European community, Dyer marched 50 men into the Bagh and subsequently opened fire, killing 379 and wounding a further 1,500.Collett 2007) Amanullah decided to invade British India.

=== Third Anglo-Afghan War (1919) ===
The Third Anglo-Afghan War (Pashto: دریم انګلو افغان جنګ), also known as the Third Afghan War, the British-Afghan war of 1919 and in Afghanistan as the War of Independence, began on 6 May 1919 when the Emirate of Afghanistan invaded British India and ended with an armistice on 8 August 1919. The war resulted in the Afghans winning back control of foreign affairs from Britain, and the British recognizing Afghanistan as an independent nation. According to British author Michael Barthorp, it was also a minor strategic victory for the British because the Durand Line was reaffirmed as the border between Afghanistan and the British Raj, and the Afghans agreed not to foment trouble on the British side.

=== Britain and the Khost rebellion (1924) ===
The Khost rebellion, also known as the 1924 Mangal uprising, the Khost revolt or the Mangal Revolt was an uprising against the Westernization and modernizing reforms of Afghanistan's king, Amanullah Khan. The uprising was launched in Southern Province, Afghanistan, and lasted from March 1924 to January 1925. It was fought by the Mangal Pashtun tribe, later joined by the Sulaiman Khel, Ali Khel, Jaji, Jadran and Ahmadzai tribes. After causing the death of over 14,000 Afghans, the revolt was finally quelled in January 1925.

During the rebellion, The Afghan government portrayed rebel leaders as traitors seeking to serve British interests, and that the campaigns against the rebels were undertaken in the defense of Afghanistan against British influence. In British Raj however, it was generally suspected that the Soviet Union was responsible for providing financial and military aid to the rebels, while in the Soviet Union, the blame was put on Britain. Senzil Nawid writes that despite claims of British involvement by Afghan historians and the contemporary Afghan press, "neither the press reports nor Afghan historians have provided corroborating evidence for this theory". The British Library website claims that Britain supported the Afghan government.

In A Precis On Afghan Affairs (1928), Richard Roy Maconachie, writing in his capacity as a civil servant for the British Raj, reported that Britain supplied Afghan forces with barbed wire, medicine, two airplanes (on payment), 30 Lewis guns (on payment), and 3000 rifles with ammunition (on payment). He noted that, though the Afghan government accepted military support from the British empire, the portrayal of rebels as British assets was indispensable for the government's propaganda effort.

=== British role in the Afghan Civil War (1929) ===
The Afghan Civil War was fought from 14 November 1928 to 13 October 1929. Rebelling, and subsequently governing Saqqawist forces under Habibullāh Kalakāni fought against various opposing tribes and rival monarchs in the Kingdom of Afghanistan, among whom Mohammed Nādir Khān eventually achieved a preponderant role. Despite early successes, such as the capture of Kabul and defeat of Amanullah Khan on 17 January 1929 or the capture of Kandahar on 3 June, the Saqqawists were eventually deposed by anti-Saqqawist forces led by Nadir on 13 October 1929, leading to Nadir's ascension as King of Afghanistan, who ruled until his assassination on 3 November 1933.

According to a later British ambassador in Afghanistan, William Kerr Fraser-Tytler, the British empire, though officially neutral, was very concerned about the situation in Afghanistan and they "made up a set of rules to govern the situation. It was unneutral to refuse an Afghan entry into Afghanistan, but once he was in he became a contestant, and it would be unneutral to allow him to recross the border, seeking a brief asylum before plunging again into the fray. And so in a mixture of the rules of cricket and football it was ordained that a player might go on the field once, and play for the crown. But if he was forced into touch, and recrossed the line, whether voluntarily or not, he was 'out' and the referee would not let him back into the game."

Many commentators in Afghanistan and elsewhere hold the belief that Britain played a part in the fall of Amanullah in January 1929, and this is supported by Soviet Historiography. According to Encyclopædia Iranica, "While it can not be dismissed out of hand, the fact remains that no evidence to support it can be found in the copious British Indian archives pertaining to this period. There can be no doubt, however, that behind the stance of official neutrality which the British maintained throughout the crisis of 1929 lay an unwillingness to help Amān-Allāh to reconquer his throne and a benevolence toward the moves of Nāder Khan. While the Soviet authorities favored Amān-Allāh (though reluctantly) and aided a foray on his behalf by Ḡolām Nabī Čarḵī in the Balḵ region, the British authorities allowed Nāder Khan to reenter Afghanistan through India and to obtain a decisive addition of strength through his recruitment of thousands of armed Wazīr and Masʿūd frontier tribesmen. Also helpful was their decision to lift a restriction order, imposing residence at a fixed address in India, on Fażl ʿOmar Mojaddedī, who was to play an apparently decisive role in persuading the Naqšbandī mollās of Afghanistan to change sides and later was to become Nāder Shah's first minister of justice. In short, while all the evidence indicates that Bačča-ye Saqqā (Kalakani)’s rise was due solely to the internal disintegration of King Amān-Allāh's régime, there can be no doubt that British policy, tacit rather than explicit, helped to bring about Bačča-ye Saqqā’s fall".

=== Afghan neutrality in the Afridi Redshirt Rebellion (1930–1931) ===
Under Mohammad Nadir Shah, Anglo-Afghan ties were strengthened; Nadir supported for British sovereignty over Pashtuns east of the Durand line and strayed neutral when Britain repressed the Afridi Redshirt rebellion. This pro-British stance drew strong opposition from Amanullah loyalists.

=== British role in the Afghan tribal revolts of 1944–1947 ===
Britain cooperated with the Afghan government in suppressing the tribal revolts of 1944–1947, via blockade, weapons sales and aerial bombardment.

=== British role in the Afghanistan conflict (1978–2021) ===
The United Kingdom did not contribute nor actively oppose the communist-led Saur Revolution. It opposed the 1979 Soviet invasion of Afghanistan and provided both indirect and direct support for the Afghan mujahideen fighters in their struggle against the Soviet Union which included arming, funding, training and supplying various factions covertly, most notably support for Ahmad Shah Massoud in the Panjshir Valley. It had no involvement in the series of civil wars that followed Soviet withdrawal in 1989.

In 2001–2014, British combat forces served with NATO in Afghanistan when Tony Blair followed George Bush into that country in the wake of the attacks that destroyed the World Trade Center and damaged the Pentagon. The main base for the British was Camp Bastion, in the Helmand Province in the south. All but 180 trainers were scheduled to leave in late 2014.

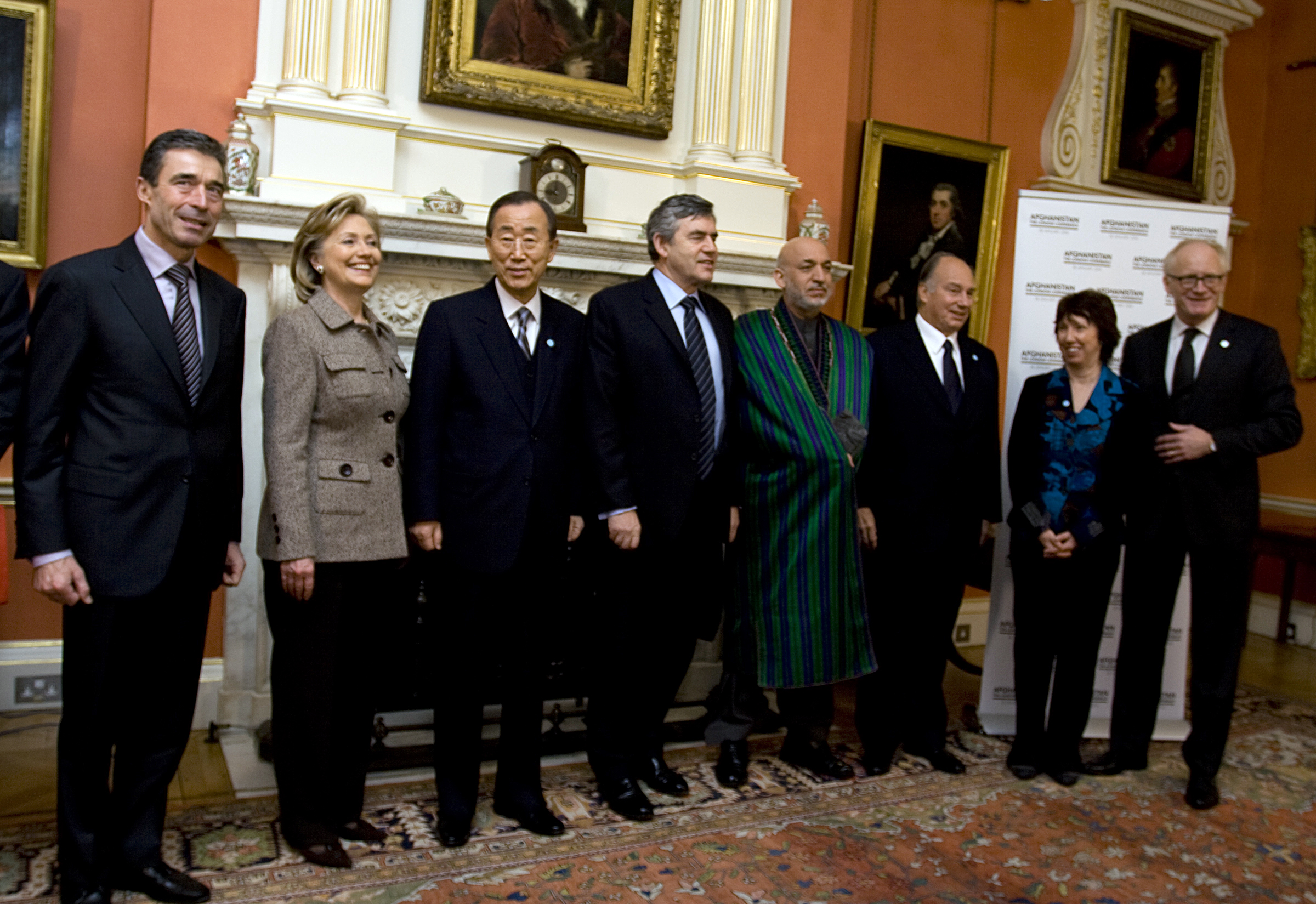
World leaders host Hamid Karzai at the London Conference on Afghanistan, 28 January 2010

On 28 January 2010, Lancaster House in London was the site of an International Conference on Afghanistan. It was at this event that the framework of the next decade of the Islamic Republic of Afghanistan was settled by the Afghan president Hamid Karzai and his successor Ashraf Ghani. As seen at right, Gordon Brown, Hillary Clinton, Catherine Ashton, Hermann van Rompuy and Anders Fogh Rasmussen amongst other Western leaders were in attendance.

During the fall of Kabul, on August 16, 2021, the U.K. sent 200 additional troops to Afghanistan, bringing the total number of U.K troops in the country to 900, in order to assist with evacuation.

The British government forced the Afghan embassy in London to close in 2024.

=== Afghan Response Route scandal ===
In July 2025, the UK government disclosed the existence of the Afghan Response Route, a secret resettlement scheme launched in response to a 2022 Ministry of Defence data breach that exposed the personal details of over 18,000 Afghans who had applied to UK relocation programmes such as ARAP. The breach, which was initially concealed under a rare superinjunction, put many of the affected individuals at risk of Taliban reprisals. The scheme ultimately brought approximately 6,900 Afghans and their family members to the UK between 2023 and 2025. The total cost of the programme was estimated at £850 million, and its existence was excluded from official immigration figures and parliamentary disclosures until the injunction was lifted following a High Court ruling.

== See also ==
- The Great Game, Russia and Britain manoeuvre for influence
- First Anglo-Afghan War (1839–1842)
- Second Anglo-Afghan War (1878–1881)
- Third Anglo-Afghan War (1919)
- Fourth Anglo-Afghan War (November 2001 – October 2014) part of the War in Afghanistan (2001–present)
- Anti-Afghan sentiment in the United Kingdom

== Sources ==
- Barthorp, Michael (2002) [1982]. Afghan Wars and the North-West Frontier 1839–1947. London: Cassell. ISBN 0-304-36294-8.
- Collett, Nigel (2007). The Butcher of Amritsar. Continuum International Publishing Group. ISBN 978-1-85285-575-8.
- Molesworth, George (1962). Afghanistan 1919—An Account of Operations in the Third Afghan War. New York: Asia Publishing House. OCLC 7233999.
- Wilkinson-Latham, Robert (1998) [1977]. North-West Frontier 1837–1947. Men-at-Arms Series # 72. London: Osprey Publishing. ISBN 0-85045-275-9.
