= Khost rebellion (1912) =

Anti-Barakzai revolt

Date	2 May (Note: 2 May 1912 is the start date used by Encyclopædia Britannica, but W. Hale and the Summary of the Administration of Lord Hardinge of Penhurst, November 1910 – March 1916 say that it started in March 1912.) – 14 August 1912 (Note: 14 August 1912 is the end date used by Encyclopædia Britannica, but the Historical Dictionary of Afghanistan states that the rebellion was suppressed in December. W. Hale says that peace was restored "by the end of July".) (3 months, 2 weeks and 6 days)
Location	Khost, Emirate of Afghanistan
Result	Government victory

Belligerents
Afghanistan	Rebel tribes: Mangal; Zadran; Ghilji

Commanders and leaders
Habibullah Khan; Mohammad Nadir Khan; Muhammad Akbar Khan; Mirzaman Khan; Sayyid Lal Shah	Jehandad Khan

Strength
4,000 regulars 18,000 tribesmen	Unknown

The Khost rebellion was a rebellion in Khost that took place in 1912 in the Emirate of Afghanistan, and was the only serious crisis during the reign of Habibullah Khan.

Its causes laid in the "rapacity and exactions" of Muhammad Akbar Khan, the local governor of the Khost district. The rebellion, which was led by Jehandad Khan, began on 2 May 1912, when Mangal and Jadran tribesmen in Khost, Afghanistan rose up, quickly overwhelmed various isolated garrisons, and besieged Muhammad Akbar at Matun. Later that month, they were joined by the Ghilzai. Understanding the danger posed by the revolt, Habibullah sent Muhammad Nadir Khan to quell the rebellion. Alongside regular infantry, Nadir was also aided by Tajik levies who were unlikely to show any sympathy to the rebels. In the British Raj, tribesmen of the Kurram District were restricted from entering Afghanistan to aid the revolt.

Muhammad Akbar eventually managed to break out of his besieged fort. By the end of May, Nadir had forced the rebels to sue for peace, and Jehandad Khan had fled to the British Raj, where he unsuccessfully lobbied for a British intervention. On 13 June, the rebellion was reported to be subsiding, and peace negotiations were going on in that same month. However, peace negotiations broke down, and in June 1912 fighting resumed. It ended on 14 August 1912, when the rebels surrendered after concessions were unexpectedly given by Afghan authorities, which included the replacement of Muhammad Akbar Khan by a new governor, Dost Muhammad. Habibullah's decision to show clemency to the rebels laid in a desire to conciliate enemies inherited from his predecessors, and the understanding that his acceptance of western ideas and encouragement of modern technical improvements had undermined his own popularity.

== See also ==
- Khost rebellion (1856–1857), prior rebellion in Khost
- Khost rebellion (1924–1925), subsequent rebellion in Khost
