= Dacom (disambiguation) =

Dacom or DACOM may refer to:

- Dacom, Inc., Fax and data company
- Deutsche-Afghanische Companie, German trading company
- LG Dacom, South Korean cellular carrier
