= Abd-al Karim =

Emir of Afghanistan

Emir (Southern Province of Afghanistan)
- Reign: July 1924 – 30 January 1925
- Born: 1897; British Raj
- Died: 18 February 1927 (aged 29–30); Rangoon, British Burma
- Spouse: Saltanat
- Issue: Abdur Razzaq
- Father: Mohammad Yaqub Khan
- Mother: A Herati slave consort

Abd-al Karim (1897–1927) was an Afghan emir who ruled only in the Southern Province from July 1924 to January 1925.

== Early life ==
Abd-al Karim was born in 1897. He was the youngest son of Mohammad Yaqub Khan, an ex-monarch of Afghanistan who was forced into exile to the British Raj in 1879, and his mother, a Herati consort, was a slave of his father. At some point in his life, he married his wife, Saltanat (a daughter of Ayub Khan (Emir of Afghanistan)), and in 1922, he had a child, Abdur Razzaq. On 4 March 1917 he escaped from Dehra Dun to tribal territory but was captured shortly thereafter by the British.

== Emir ==
In 1924, Abd-al Karim was informed that the Khost rebellion was going on in the Southern Province. "There is a rebellion now in Khost", the tribesmen said, "and it is an opportune time for you to regain the country which your father lost". In July, he crossed from British India into Afghanistan, where after 2 days of walking with the tribesmen, he reached a village called Nawakot. It was in that village that Abd-al Karim met the leader of the Zadran tribe, Burland Khan. (Note: This sentence, which is based on the account of Rhea Talley Stewart, contradicts other sources – namely, Ludwig Adamec and David Edwards state that the Zadran tribe was actually led by Babrak Khan at this time.) Soon after he arrived, all the countryside would learn of Abd-al Karim's return. Crowds arrived in Nawakot to pay him homage, and a proclamation was created in Persian which declared Abd-al Karim to be the new Emir, which was stamped with the thumbprints of men from various different tribes. After proclaiming to the rebels that he would govern justly with a council of 40 ulama, he assumed control of the rebellion.

In his memoir, Habibullāh Kalakāni, who fought as a soldier of Amanullah during the rebellion, states that Abd-al Karim failed to be an inspiration to the rebel forces. He writes that "He hoped that the name which he bore and the memory of his grandfather would cause the country to turn to him and to proclaim him as deliverer against one who sought to impose unpopular reforms. Abdul Karim was mistaken. No one evinced very much interest in him. He was politely received. His sword was accepted as an adjunct to the rebel forces, but he never became more than an individual."

After the defeat of the rebellion in January 1925 he evaded capture, and fled back into British India, where he was interned in Lahore and Benares.

== Exile and death ==
While in exile in British Burma, Karim converted to Christianity, much to the astonishment of the local Muslim community.

Abd-al Karim died in Rangoon in British Burma, in the year 1927. According to Louis Dupree, he was killed, possibly by an Afghan agent, while according to Ludwig W. Adamec, his murderer was an Afghan nationalist.

According to the account of Rhea Talley steward, Abd-al Karim committed suicide on 18 February, after repeatedly expressing fear of being assassinated by an Afghan agent. In one of his farewell letters, Abd-al Karim asked to be buried as a Christian, even though he died before his baptism. Instead, when the news of his death reached Karim's half-brothers in Dehra Dun, he was mourned with the Muslim Fatiha. Some of the people who attended Abd-al Karim's funeral had been veterans of his rebellion.
