= Prabhjot Kaur =

Punjabi author and poet

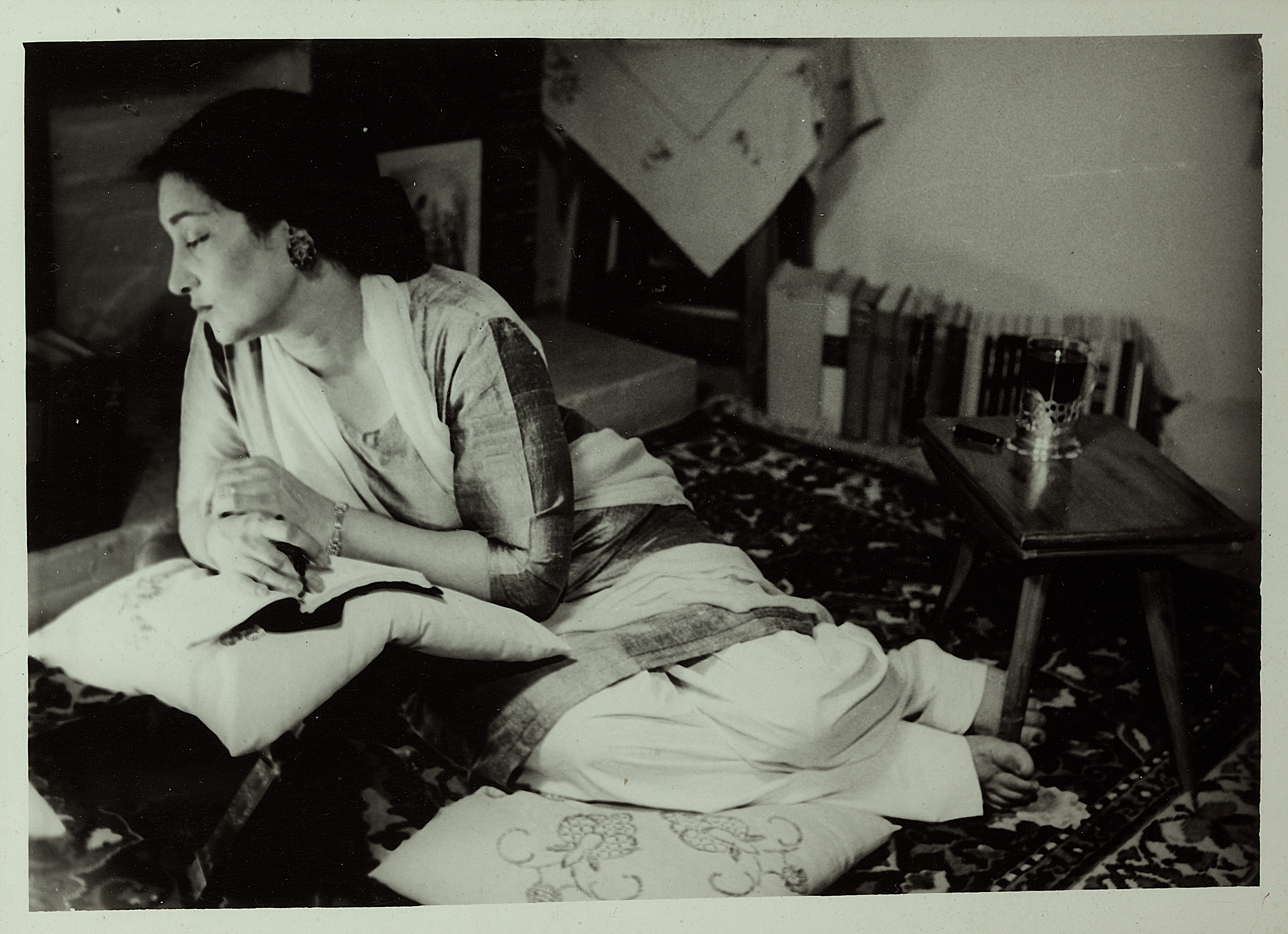
- Prabhjot Kaur in early 1960s
- Born: 6 July 1924
- Died: 24 November 2016 (aged 92)
- Occupation: Author

Prabhjot Kaur (6 July 1924 – 24 November 2016), was a Punjabi author and poet.

== Biography ==
She was born in 1924 in a small village called Langrial in Gujrat, British India.

Kaur married Narenderpal Singh, who was also a writer and novelist. She lived in Defence Colony, New Delhi. She had two daughters, Anupama & Nirupma. Nirupma was married to Harinder Singh, son of Hukam Singh, First speaker of Parliament. Anupama was married to former Indian Army Chief J.J.Singh.

== Books and poems ==
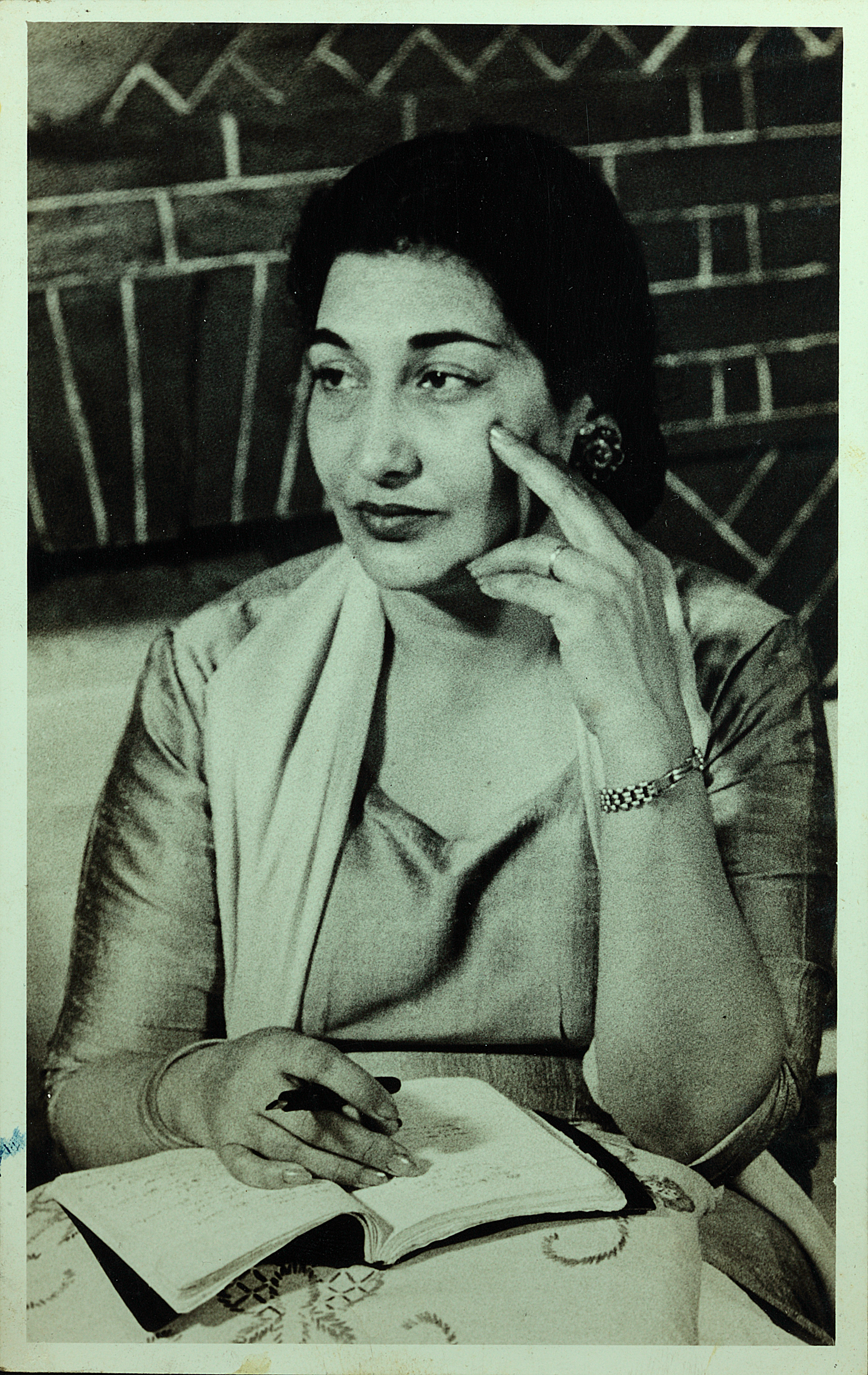
- Prabhjot Kaur at Delhi Cantt. in 1962
  Plateau
- Dreams die young
- Pabbī : Pañjābī kavitā-saṅkalana
- Zindagī de kujha pala
- Kiṇake
- Madhiāntara
- Candara yuga : kawitāwāṃ
- Khāṛī
- Kandhárí hawá
- Bolaṇa dī nahīṃ jā we aṛiā

== Awards and honours ==
- Kaur, along with her husband Narenderpal Singh, won the Sahitya Akademi Award in 1964 for her collection of poems, "Pabbi".
- Padma Shri award, 1967.
- "La Rose de France" award, 1968
- Poetry Society of America has decorated her with Distinguished Order of Poetry.
- Nominated to the Vidhan Parishad of Punjab.
- Member of UNESCO
