= Narenderpal Singh =

Indian novelist (1923–2003)

Narenderpal Singh or Narinder Pal Singh (17 October 1923 – c. May 2003) was an Indian novelist who wrote in Punjabi. He was awarded the Sahitya Akademi Award in 1976 for his book Baa Mulahaza Hoshiar by the Government of India.

== Life and career ==
Singh was born in Lyallpur, British India on 17 October 1923. He served in the armed forces from 1942, serving in West Asia during World War II. He later served as a military attache and was Military Secretary to the President of India from 1962–1966. He retired with the rank of Brigadier in 1972.

Singh was married to poet Prabhjot Kaur, who died in November 2016, at the age of 92. Singh suffered from osteoarthritis in later life. He died in 2003, at the age of 79.

== Books ==
- Trapped
- On the Crest of Time
- The Flaming Hills
- Mohan Singh
- Furrows in the Snow
- Light Stands Aside
- Crossroads
- Sūtaradhāra
- Ṭāpū
- Wālahu Nikkī

== Awards ==
He won the Sahitya Akademi Award in 1976 for his book Baa Mulahaza Hoshiar (Be prepared for the royal visit).

== See also ==
- List of Sahitya Akademi Award winners for Punjabi
