= Kulangar =

Kulangar/ Kolangar کلنگار, کلنګار
- village
- Location within Afghanistan
- Coordinates: 34°02′17″N 069°01′20″E
- Country: Afghanistan
- Province: Logar Province
- Rural District: Puli Alam District
- Time zone: UTC+4:30 (IRST)
  - Summer (DST): UTC+5:30 (IRDT)

Kulangār/ Kolangar (Dari: کلنگار, Pashto: کلنګار) is a village in Pul-i Alam District, Logar province, Afghanistan.

== Name ==
The folk etymology behind the name Kulangār is for it to having to do with a story about a crane (Persian: kulang, کلنگ). The more likely origin of the name however are the Dardic words kul meaning "tribe" and aṅgār meaning "fire", making up the meaning "fire tribe". This origin may be a relic of the Dardic languages native to the region in pre-Islamic times.

== The Shrine of Malik Sabz Ali ==
In Kulangar lies the shrine of Malik Sabz Ali ibn Malik Yusuf (died 1541 CE). The site is a popular place of pilgrimage, attracting visitors from around the province.
