= Alikhel =

Pashtun tribe in Afghanistan and Pakistan

Alikhel (Pashto: علي‌خېل) or Alikhil or Alikhail is a Pashtun tribe in Afghanistan, Pakistan, and India. Alikhel belongs to the tribe of the Panni confederation of Pashtuns. It is considered a "brother tribe" of the Sulaimankhel.

In 1924, the Alikhel joined in the Khost Rebellion initiated by the Mangal tribe.

According to the Naval Postgraduate School (2007), the Ali Khel sub-tribe includes the following branches:

  - Adu Khel
  - Bukhran Khel
  - Dawalak
  - Gaddi / Gaddai
  - Isaf
  - Kambar Khel
  - Khudzai (Khuduzai)
  - Mamozai
  - Manzar Khel
  - Maskai
  - Mush Khel
  - Saikach
  - Shahmurad Khel
  - Urba
  - Banjar / Banjari
  - Chaka
  - Gada Khel
  - Gargin
  - Isap Khel
  - Khozai
  - Maist
  - Mamun
  - Mardan Khel
  - Minzai
  - Nikab
  - Shah Alam Khel
  - Sulaimanzai
  - Uria Khel

== See also ==
- Ali Khil, Speni Oba, Malam Jaba, Swat, Pakistan
- Ali Khel, Orakzai Agency, Pakistan
- Ali Khel, Jalandhar, Punjab, India
- Ali Khel, a district in Ghazni, Afghanistan
- Ali Khel, Waziristan, a town in Federally Administered Tribal Areas, Pakistan
- Ali Khel, a town in Balochistan, Pakistan
- Ali Khel, Malakand, Swat KPK, Pakistan
- Ali Khel, Paktia, Afghanistan
- Ali Khel, district of Laghman, Afghanistan
- Ali Khel, Azakhel Bala, Nowshera of KPK province of Pakistan
- Ali Khel, Dushi District, Baghlan of Afghanistan
