= Jehandad Khan =

Emir of Afghanistan

Emir of Afghanistan (Khost only)
- In office early – late May 1912
- Preceded by: Habibullah Khan
- Succeeded by: Habibullah Khan

Personal details
- Died: 1914 Emirate of Afghanistan
- Children: Ghaus-ud-din Khan Abdul Samad Khan
- Tribe: Ghilzai

Military service
- Battles/wars: Khost rebellion (1912)

Jehandad Khan (died 1914) was an Afghan rebel emir who ruled only in Khost for a few weeks. He was born as a member of the Ghilzai tribe, and spent most of his life as a chieftain. After start of the Khost rebellion on 2 May 1912, he briefly laid claim to the Afghan throne in opposition to Habibullah Khan, but an offensive by Muhammad Nadir Khan forced him to flee to the British Raj by the end of the same month. When Jehandad arrived in India, he was given the option of immediately returning to Afghanistan or staying in India, and he chose the latter. He then appealed to the British authorities for an intervention in Afghanistan to aid the rebellion, but was unsuccessful. Later in 1912, Jehandad managed to return to Afghanistan, where he was apprehended, put on trial, sentenced to death and executed by a firing squad in 1914.

Regnal titles
Preceded by Habibullah Khan	Emir of Afghanistan; May 1912	Succeeded by Habibullah Khan
