= Fatima Khel Kalan =

- Town and union council
- Interactive map of Fatima Khel Kalan
- Country: Pakistan
- Region: Khyber Pakhtunkhwa
- District: Bannu District
- Time zone: UTC+5 (PST)

Fatima Khel Kalan is a town and union council of Bannu District in the Khyber Pakhtunkhwa of Pakistan. It is located at 32°59′21″N 70°36′49″E and has an altitude of 356 metres (1,168 ft).
