= William Kerr Fraser-Tytler =

British soldier and diplomat (1886–1963)

Lt-Col Sir William Kerr Fraser-Tytler KBE CMG MC (26 December 1886 – 23 August 1963) was a British soldier and diplomat. He was Envoy to Afghanistan from 1935 to 1941.

== Life ==
He was educated at Charterhouse and Christ Church, Oxford and graduated in 1909.

Commissioned into Lovat's Scouts 1 April 1908. Entered the Indian Army 1910 and posted to the 25th Cavalry Frontier Force in 1911. Served on the North West Frontier of India 1914-17 and then in East Africa 1917-18 where he won the Military Cross. He served during the 3rd Afghan War then went on deputation to England with the Indian Peace contingent from 22 June to 13 October 1919. After that he was appointed to the Foreign and Political Department.

Appointed Under-Secretary to the Government of India 1921-23; Secretary to H.M.'s Legation, Kabul, Afghanistan, 1923–24; served in Travancore, Southern India, and on the North West Frontier, 1925-28. Councillor, H.M.'s Legation, Kabul, 1928. North West Frontier, 1928-30; Councillor and Chargé d'Affaires, H.M.'s Legation, Kabul 1930-32; Deputy-Secretary, Government of India and Officiating Foreign Secretary, 1933. Appointed a Companion of the Order of St. Michael and St. George in June 1933. Officiating Private Secretary to the Viceroy, 1934. Appointed H.M. Minister H.M.'s Legation, Kabul, Afghanistan 1935-41. Appointed a Knight Commander of the Order of the British Empire in January 1939.

=== Bibliography ===
He is the author of Afghanistan: A Study in Political Developments in Central and Southern Asia, London, Oxford University Press, 1950, 348 p. (reprinted 1950, 1953, 1962). Malcolm Yapp wrote that Fraser-Tytler's work is 'well told and the analysis of processes vigorous and penetrating.'

Diplomatic posts
Preceded by Sir Richard Maconachie	Envoy Extraordinary and Minister Plenipotentiary to His Majesty the Amir of Afghanistan; 1935–1941	Succeeded by Sir Francis Wylie
