= Emil Trinkler =

German geographer and explorer

Emil Trinkler (19 May 1896, Bremen – 19 April 1931, Bremen) was a German geographer and explorer of Tibet and Afghanistan, the son of a wealthy tobacco trader from the wealthy Swiss Trinkler family. Emil Trinkler’s father was one of the richest people in Germany during the early 20th century.

== Life and travels ==
Having fought in the World War I, Trinkler graduated in geography and natural science from the Ludwig-Maximilians-Universität München in 1922. His exploratory journeys in Afghanistan, Kashmir and Tibet included close study of glaciers. Among several books he published on his return to Germany was Im Land der Stürme (In the Land of Storms, 1930). His archaeological collections can be found in the Überseemuseum Bremen. In 1927-28 Trinkler led a German scientific expedition to Tibet, which he documented in two books published in 1930. His career as an explorer and Asia expert was cut short the following year when he was killed in an automobile accident near his native Bremen. World Digital Library

== Death and remembrance ==
Trinkler died as the result of an automobile accident near Bremen at the age of 35. A street in Bremen has been named for him.

== Through the Heart of Afghanistan ==
Through the Heart of Afghanistan is an English translation of Emil Trinkler's Quer durch Afghanistan nach Indien, published in Berlin in 1927. Trinkler (1896-1931) was a German geographer and explorer who went to Afghanistan in 1923-24 as a geologist for the Afghan-German Trading Company. The book is an account of Trinkler's voyage, which began in Riga, Latvia, and included a trip by train across Russia followed by a seven-week delay at the Russian-Afghan border. Trinkler eventually succeeded in entering Afghanistan and traveled on to India. The book contains vivid accounts of the places he visited, including Herat, central Afghanistan, Kabul, Peshawar, and the "Valley of the Great Buddha," where Trinkler viewed the large, rock Buddhist statues of Bamian (destroyed by the Afghan Taliban in 2001). The chapter on Kabul describes the opening up of the country brought about by the amir, Amanullah Khan (ruled 1919-29), and the work of German architects and engineers in building roads, of the German medical mission in superintending the hospitals, and of "the celebrated German-Afghan Company [in] trying to reorganize the administration and business of Afghanistan." The book includes 44 photographs by the author and a fold-out map of Afghanistan. Trinkler published the scientific results of his trip in a separate volume, Afghanistan: Eine landeskundliche Studie auf Grund des vorhandenen Materials und eigener Beobachtung (Afghanistan: A country study based on existing records and personal observation, Gotha, 1928).

== Literary works ==
- Tibet : Sein geographisches Bild und seine Stellung im Asiatischen Kontinen, (1922)
- Through the heart of Afghanistan, (1928)., translation of Trinkler's Quer durch Afghanistan nach Indien (1927)
- The Stormswept Roof of Asia, translation of Trinkler's Im Land der Stürme (1930)
