= Afghan-German Trading Company =

German trading company

- Deutsche-Afghanische Companie
- Formation: 1923
- Dissolved: 1929
- Headquarters: Kabul
- Chief local representative: Kurt Wagner (1923 - 1924); Ebner (1924 - ?)

The Afghan-German Trading Company (DACOM; German: Deutsche-Afghanische Companie), originally known as the German and Oriental Trade House was a trading company which was established in 1923 by an association of German enterprises, which had its office in Kabul.

== History ==
The Niedermayer–Hentig Expedition, also known as the Kabul Mission, was a diplomatic mission to Afghanistan sent by the Central Powers in 1915–1916. The purpose was to encourage Afghanistan to declare full independence from the British Empire, enter World War I on the side of the Central Powers, and attack British India. One of the German officials involved in the expedition, Kurt Wagner, reached Herat and decided to stay there.

In summer 1923, DACOM was founded by three Germans, including Kurt Wagner of the Niedermayer–Hentig Expedition, geographer Emil Trinkler, and Gotthilf Blaich, a technical consultant. The company was originally called the German and Oriental Trade House (Deutsch-Orientalische Handelsgesellschaft), but the name was changed to DACOM a year later. DACOM operated under a provisional license until July 1925.

In 1924, Ebner succeeded Kurt Wagner as chief local representative of DACOM.

In February 1925, DACOM was reported as doing a "fair amount" of business, acting as brokers for silvers for a new currency, and to have placed orders in Germany for wireless sets, machinery, and electrical materials. At this time, Ebner found himself in conflict with the Afghan government which only permitted him to trade with persons selected by the government.

By 1926, the German trading company had become one of the most successful in the country, second only to the Russian enterprises, and later on, it surpassed even them.

On 15 April 1929, during the Afghan civil war of 1928-29, Habibullāh Kalakāni contacted Muhammad Musa Khan Qandahari, a director of DACOM, and 7 other Qandaharis, requesting them to assassinate Amanullah Khan (who was contesting the Afghan throne), promising them a large reward if they did so.

DACOM was forced out of business due to economic difficulties relating to the 1928-1929 Afghan civil war.
