= Alizai rebellion of 1923 =

1923 rebellion in southern Afghanistan

- A map of modern-day Helmand Province, where the fighting took place.
Date	June or July – December 1923 (Note: According to Survey of International Affairs, the rebellion started in summer 1923, and according to An Intimate War: An Oral History of the Helmand Conflict, 1978–2012, the rebellion lasted 6 months. Since all sources agree that the rebellion took place in 1923, the earliest possible start date is 22 June (the date of summer solstice in Afghanistan in 1923), while last possible start date is 1 July (6 months after any later date would put the end date in 1924).) (6 months)
Location	Zamindawar, Afghanistan
Result	Afghan government victory

Belligerents
Emirate of Afghanistan	Alizai rebels

Commanders and leaders
Amanullah Khan	Unknown

The Alizai rebellion of 1923 was a rebellion by the Alizai tribe in the region of Zamindawar, in modern-day Helmand Province of the Emirate of Afghanistan, which took place in 1923. The causes laid in opposition to the reforms of Amanullah Khan, namely in regards to conscription and taxation. The rebellion lasted 6 months, largely because none of the conscripted battalions in the south were willing to fight the Alizai. Ultimately, the rebellion was defeated with troops from Herat, who executed rebel leaders and deported groups of Zamindawaris to Afghan Turkestan.

== See also ==
- Khost rebellion (1924–1925), uprising in Afghanistan that begun in the subsequent year
