= Richard Roy Maconachie =

English naturalist and civil servant

Sir Richard Roy Maconachie, KBE, CIE (1885 - 18 January 1962) was an English civil servant in India, naturalist and BBC employee.

He studied at Tonbridge School in Kent, England and University College, Oxford before joining the Indian Civil Service in 1909. He was appointed a 2nd lieutenant in the Indian Army Reserve of Officers in 1917. In 1923, he played billiards with Amanullah Khan, then the Emir of Afghanistan.

He was British Minister in Kabul, Afghanistan from 1929 to 1935. During his time in Afghanistan, Maconachie assembled a collection of native birds that he later presented to the Natural History Museum at Tring in Tring, England (BMNH 1935-12-28). These bird skins became the basis of ornithologist Hugh Whistler's paper on the birds of Afghanistan in the Journal of the Bombay Natural History Society in 1944–45.

In 1936, he succeeded Charles Siepmann as head of Talks at the BBC. It was widely considered a "swing to the right".

He was appointed a Companion of the Order of the Indian Empire (CIE) in the 1926 New Year Honours, and a Knight Commander of the Order of the British Empire (KCB) in the 1931 Birthday Honours.

== Offices held ==
Diplomatic posts
Preceded by Sir Francis Humphrys	Envoy Extraordinary and Minister Plenipotentiary to His Majesty the Amir of Afghanistan; 1929–1935	Succeeded by Sir William Fraser-Tytler

== Literature ==
- Warr, F. E.: Manuscripts and Drawings in the ornithology and Rothschild libraries of The Natural History Museum at Tring, BOC 1996.
