= Ludwig W. Adamec =

American historian (1924–2019)

Ludwig W. Adamec (10 March 1924 – 1 January 2019) was an Austrian scholar on the Middle East and Afghanistan. He was a professor emeritus in the School of Middle East and North African Studies at the University of Arizona. He wrote and edited numerous books, including the republication of the monumental Historical and political gazetteer of Afghanistan, which had originally been compiled but was unpublished by the government in British India.

== Biography ==
Born in Vienna in 1924, his father died when Adamec was 5 years old. His mother died when he was 16 years old (in 1940). He did not like the Nazi ideology and described himself as a "swing kid". After numerous escapes from orphanages and attempts to cross border to Switzerland, or another non-Nazi country, he was arrested and placed in the Moringen concentration camp where he stayed until the end of the Second World War.

In 1950, he left Austria and after travels across Europe, Asia and Africa. He moved to the US in 1954, where he obtained a doctorate in Middle Eastern studies.

In 1967, he came to the University of Arizona as a scholar in Middle Eastern studies. He taught the history of Middle East and Sub-Saharan Africa from about 500 A.D. to present days, and also for some time taught Arabic and Persian languages at the university. In 1975, he established a Near Eastern Center at the university and headed the center for the subsequent 10 years.

In 1986–87 he headed the Afghanistan Branch at Voice of America.

On 1 January 2019, Adamec died in Tucson, Arizona, at the age of 95.

== List of publications ==
- Ludwig W. Adamec: The A to Z of Islam, 2nd Ed (2009), Orient Paperbacks, ISBN 978-81-709454-1-3
- Ludwig W. Adamec: Afghanistan, 1900–1923: A Diplomatic History, Berkeley: University of California Press, 1967.
- Ludwig W. Admec: Afghanistan's Foreign Affairs to the Mid-Twentieth Century: Relations with the USSR, Germany, and Britain, Tucson: University of Arizona Press, 1974.
- Ludwig W. Adamec and Frank A. Clements: Conflict in Afghanistan: An Encyclopedia, Santa Barbara: ABC-CLIO, 2003.
- Ludwig W. Adamec: Historical and political gazetteer of Afghanistan, 6 vols. Graz: Akad. Druck- und Verl.-Anst., 1972–1985.
- Ludwig W. Adamec: Historical dictionary of Afghan wars, revolutions, and insurgencies, Lanham: Rowman & Littlefield, 2nd. ed. 2005.
- Ludwig W. Adamec: Historical Dictionary of Afghanistan, Lanham: The Scarecrow Press, Inc. 3rd ed. 2003.
- Ludwig W. Adamec: Historical Dictionary of Islam, Scarecrow Press, 2nd ed. 2009.

=== Articles ===
- Anglo-Afghan Treaty of 1921 - Encyclopedia Iranica, Vol. II, Fasc. 1, pp. 36–37, originally published in 1985, updated in 2011
- Egypt: Relations with Afghanistan - Encyclopedia Iranica, Vol. VIII, Fasc. 3, pp. 266–267, originally published in 1998, updated in 2011
- Third Anglo-Afghan War - Encyclopedia Iranica, Vol. II, Fasc. 1, pp. 37–41, originally published in 1985, updated in 2011
