= Treaty of Gandamak =

1879 treaty ending the first phase of the Second Anglo-Afghan War

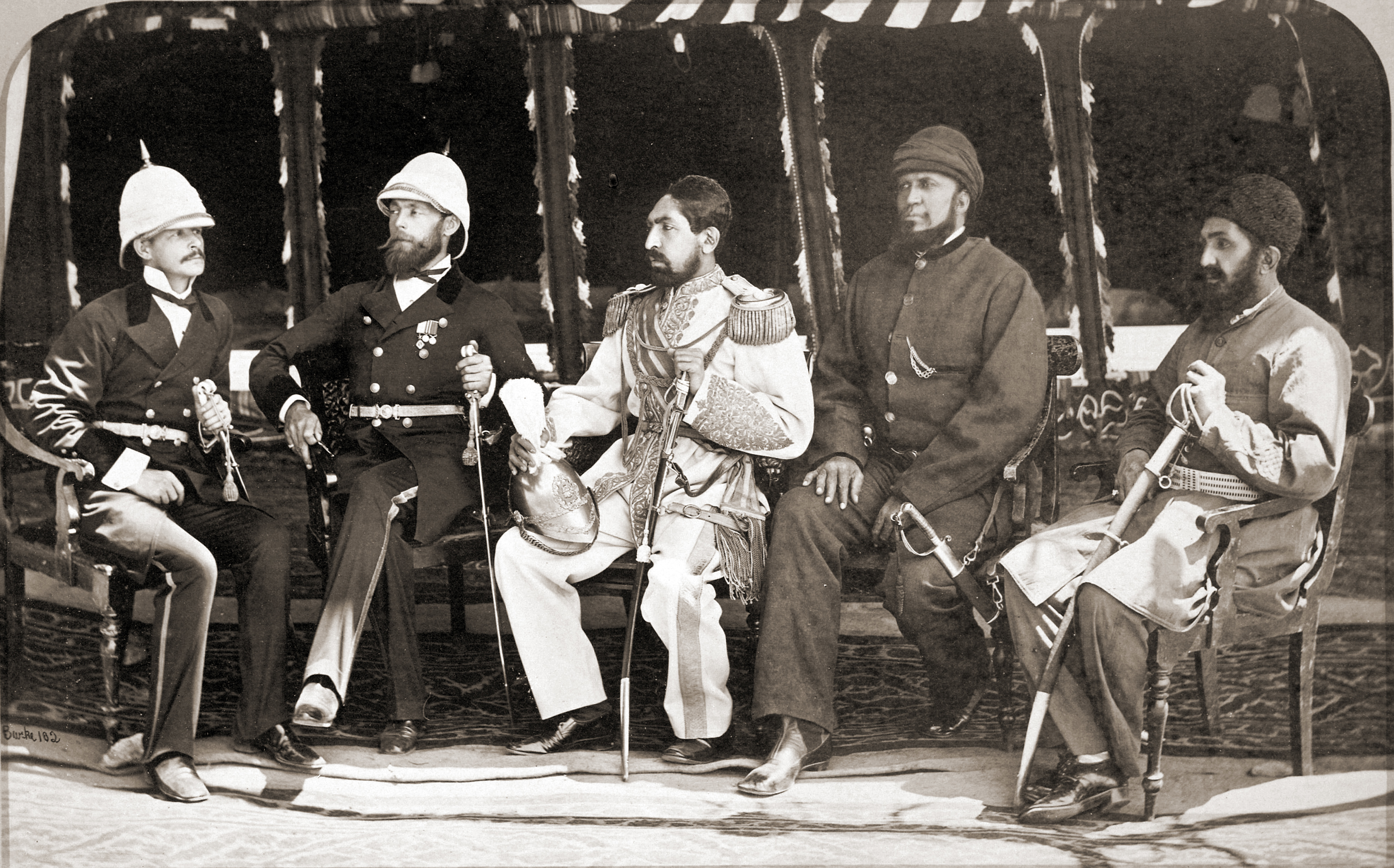
Mohammad Yaqub Khan of Afghanistan (in the middle) with Sir Louis Cavagnari (second from left), military administrator of the British Government of India, on 26 May 1879.

The Treaty of Gandamak (Note: Pashto: د گندمک تړون) officially ended the first phase of the Second Anglo-Afghan War. The Afghan emir Mohammad Yaqub Khan ceded various frontier areas as well as Afghanistan's control of its foreign affairs to the British Raj.

It was signed on 26 May 1879 by King Mohammad Yaqub Khan of Afghanistan and Sir Louis Cavagnari of the British Government of India at a British army camp near the village of Gandamak, about 70 miles (110 km) east of Kabul. The treaty was ratified by Lord Edward Robert Bulwer-Lytton, Viceroy of India, on 30 May 1879.

Most historical writings consider the Treaty of Gandamak as the prelude to the second phase of the Second Anglo-Afghan War, 1879–1880. As result of the British victory at the Battle of Kandahar in 1880 the treaty was reaffirmed and the British appointed Abdur Rahman, a British opponent, as Emir of Afghanistan. Later during Abdur Rahman's reign, he constantly opposed the British and forced them to concede and support him in his foreign policy and internal rule.

== Background ==
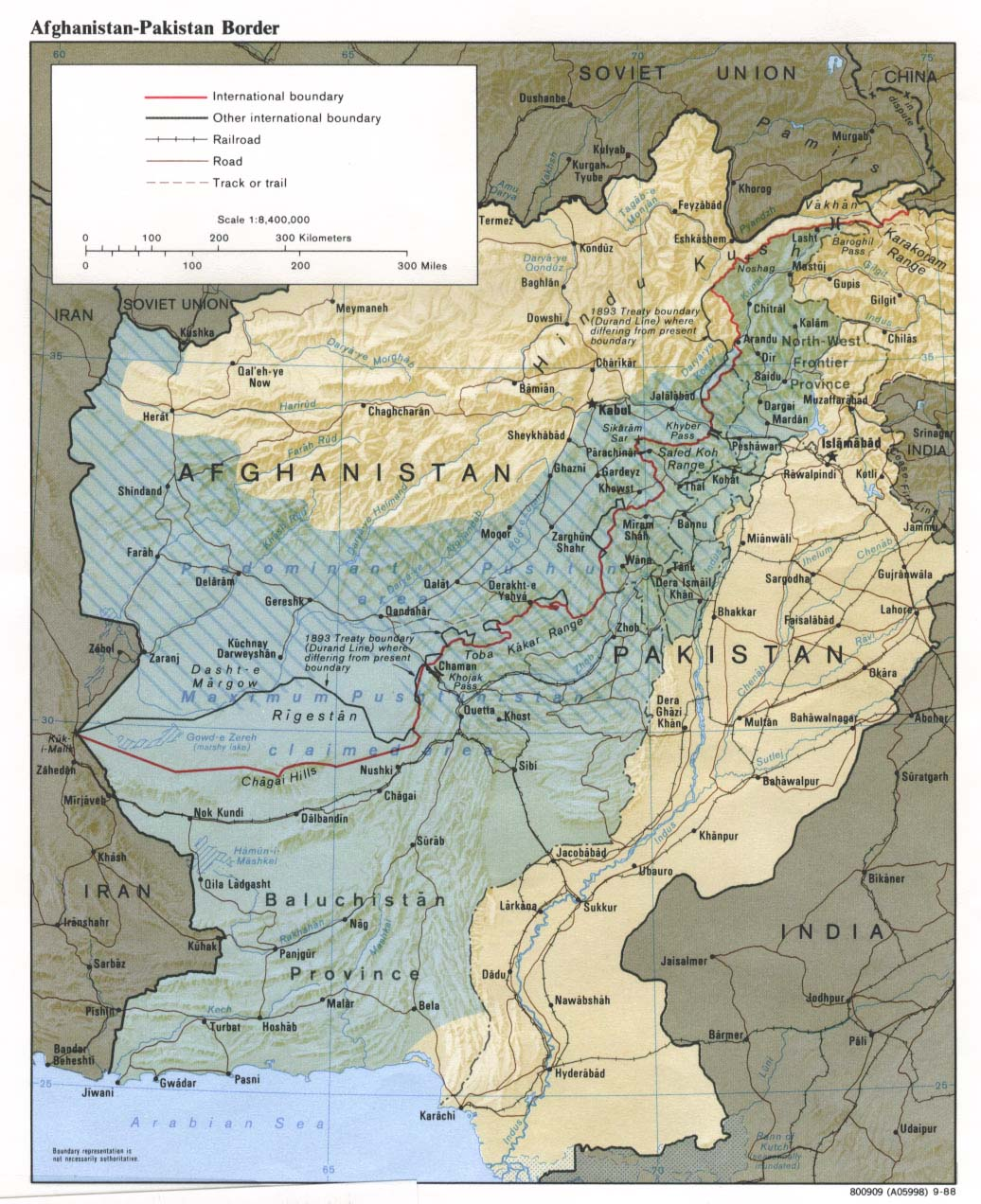
The Durand Line (in red and black (see map) above) forms the border between the Emirate of Afghanistan and the British Raj.

On 22 July 1878, a Russian delegation arrived in Kabul without the explicit invitation of the Afghan emir Sher Ali Khan. In early August 1878 to counteract the Russian initiative, the British Government of India informed Sher Ali that he must receive a special mission that included members of other European states "with all becoming honors."

The mission was denied entry into Afghanistan at a military post commanded by Ali Masjid in the Khyber pass on 21 September. In retaliation, the British Government of India issued an ultimatum that by 20 November 1878 the Afghan emir must apologize for the effrontery and provide a satisfactory explanation. Sher Ali's response of 19 November 1878, delayed by his own son and heir apparent's death on 17 August, did not reach the Viceroy of India until 30 November, and lacked an apology.

On 21 November the British Raj declared war on Afghanistan, occupied the Korram valley and the Paywar pass, and moved its armed forces via the Khyber Pass and Quetta towards Jalalabad and Qandahar, respectively. Unable to offer effective military resistance, on 23 December 1878, the Afghan emir left Kabul for Turkestan, intending to seek Russian aid for the defence of his domains. Sher Ali died on 21 February 1879 near Balkh and his son, Mohammad Yaqub Khan, declared himself Emir of Afghanistan. On 26 May 1879, after preliminary correspondence with Cavagnari prior to the British withdrawal from most occupied Afghan territories, Muhammad Yaqub's request for permission to visit the British military camp was accepted, and so he proceeded there to sign the Treaty of Gandamak, considered one of the most humiliating ever accepted by an Afghan ruler, essentially making the Afghan emir a feudatory of the British Crown.

== Settlements ==
"His Highness the Amir of Afghanistan and its depen-dencies engages, on the exchange of the ratifications of this Treaty, to publish a full and complete amnesty, absolving all his subjects from any responsibility for intercourse with the British forces during the war, and to guarantee and protect all persons of whatever degree from any punishment or molestation on that account. His Highness the Amir of Afghanistan and its depen-dencies agrees to conduct his relations with Foreign States in accordance with the advice and wishes of the British Government. His Highness the Amir will enter into no engagements with Foreign States, and will not take up arms against any Foreign State, except with the concurrence of the British Government. On these conditions the British Government will support the Amir against any foreign aggression with money, arms, or troops, to be employed in whatsoever manner the British Government may judge best for this purpose. Should British troops at any time enter Afghanistan for the purpose of repelling foreign aggression, they will return to their stations in British territory as soon as the object for which they entered has been accomplished." —First section of the treaty

Under the provisions of the treaty the Amir surrendered control over Afghan foreign relations policy and allowed for a British Mission, with European members, to reside in Kabul. Jurisdiction over the Korram and Pishin valleys, the Sibi district, and the Khyber pass were transferred to the British. The treaty provided for increased commercial contacts and the establishment of a telegraph line between Kabul and British India. Mohammad Yaqub Khan was to issue amnesty to all those who had collaborated with the British occupying forces.

The British Mission led by Cavagnari arrived in Kabul on 24 July 1879, but less than two months later Cavagnari and all members of his Mission were massacred when on 3 September 1879 a dissatisfied regiment of the Amir's army from Herat stormed the mission compound.

The massacre set the stage for another British invasion of Afghanistan and the expulsion of Mohammad Yaqub Khan to India. It culminated in the British appointment of Abdur Rahman (ruled 22 July 1880 – 1 October 1901), a patrilateral cousin of Yaqub, as Amir of Afghanistan. Abdur Rahman accepted the provisions of the Treaty of Gandamak - with the condition that the British abandon their objective of maintaining a British resident in Kabul which was accepted.

== Aftermath ==
Despite attempts from the British to dissuade Afghanistan from Russian influence, Abdur Rahman Khan adopted an autocratic government similar to the Tsars of Russia, inspired by Peter the Great from his time in exile in Turkestan. Alongside this, despite the British attempting to prop up Afghanistan as a key ally, Abdur Rahman Khan often acted against the British, with atrocities horrifying even Queen Victoria. Abdur Rahman also refused to give information regarding his troops, with his own autobiography criticizing British policy, while also violating the Lyall agreement by instead of allowing the British to oversee his diplomatic affairs, held them himself with numerous countries including Iran, the Ottoman Empire, and the German Empire. Abdur Rahman also wrote in pamphlets, encouraging Jihad against the British and the Russians, claiming both wished to end Afghanistan as a state. Senior British officials found it extremely difficult to further cooperate with Abdur Rahman Khan and Afghanistan due to the Turkestan atrocities, as well as his actions against the Hazaras. The British believed they had no other alternative but to support Abdur Rahman Khan, scoring a diplomatic victory for him.

== See also ==
- Anglo-Afghan Treaty of 1919
- European influence in Afghanistan
- Western imperialism in Asia

== Sources ==
- Aitchison, C. U. (1892). A Collection of Treaties, Engagements and Sanads Relating to India and Neighboring Countries. Vol. IX. Calcutta.
- Ghobar, M. Ghulam (1967). Afganestan dar masir-e tarikò. Kabul.
- Gregorian, V. (1969). The Emergence of Modern Afghanistan: Politics of Reform and Modernization, 1880-1946. Stanford.
- Hamilton, A. (1906). Afghanistan. London.
- Hanna, H. B. (1910). The Second Afghan War, 1878-79-80: Its Causes, Its Conduct, and Its Consequences. Vol. 3 vols. Westminster.
- Heathcote, T. A. (1980). The Afghan Wars, 1839-1919. London.
- Official War Office Historian (1908). "India Army Intelligence Branch: The Second Afghan War, 1878-80". London.
- Kakar, M. H. (1971). Afghanistan: A Study in International Political Developments, 1880-1896. Kabul.
- Singhal, D. P. (1982). India and Afghanistan: A Study in Diplomatic Relations, 1876-1907. New Delhi.
- M. E. Yapp (1980). Strategies of British India: Britain, Iran, and Afghanistan. Oxford.
