= Mangal (Pashtun tribe) =

Ethnic group

منگل

Languages
- Pashto

Religion
- Sunni Islam

Related ethnic groups
- Khattaks · Zadrans · Zazais · Banuchis · Wazir and other Karlani Pashtun tribes

The Mangal (Pashto: منګل) are a tribe of the Pashtun people residing in eastern Paktia and adjacent Khost provinces of Afghanistan, and in the town of Tari Mangal, district Kurram, Pirdil Khel, Fatima Khel and Surrani of Bannu Pakistan. Their land constitutes the northeastern part of the Loya Paktia (Greater Paktia) region. The Mangals descend from Karlani Pashtun lineage. Mangals have resisted the various militant groups in the region and other external infiltrators, nevertheless they have remained neutral in respect of recent conflicts. The majority of Mangals are spread across Afghanistan who among other Afghans have been attached to professions such as politicians, military commanders, teachers and scholars specializing in Pashto literature. The Mangal leaders are most recognized for settling tribal disputes and have established an unwritten code known as nerkh, which the Pashtun tribes still use as a tool to resolve conflict among each other. A small number of Mangals residing in the present day lakki marwat District around 1500 AD along with the Honi tribe. Most of these Mangals live as independent in lakki marwat (kpk) and in Kurma Pakistan which borders the Mangal province of Paktia in Afghanistan.

Mangal tribe is also found in Pakistan's Khyber-Pakhtunkhwa province mainly in area of Thall Valley and also in District Hangu and Orakzai Agency of FATA. A large group of Mangal's are living in the valley of kurram agency's areas such as Tari Mangal, Kutri Mangal, Gobazana, Haqdara, Gidu, Sursurang, Piwar tangi and Shalawzan Tangi. Mangal tribe also found in Qematay Mangal nearer to Tari Mangal on Afghanistan side. Mangals Of Tari Mangal and Mangals of Qematay Mangal are relatives of each other. These Mangals on both sides of the border between Pakistan and Afghanistan are called the saver of the border. Tari Mangal, Qematay, Kutri, Gidu and Shalawzan are popular for tourism as thousands of people from different parts of Pakistan have been visiting these zones on special occasions. Almost 70% to 75% Mangal are live in Afghanistan side and 20% to 25% live in Pakistan side.

== History ==
The Mangal Pashtuns partook in the Anglo-Afghan War of 1879, they attacked the train baggage of the invading British Armies at Kurram.

From 1924 to 1925, the Mangal fought in the Khost rebellion (1924–1925).

The Mangal tribal militia was one of the various militias assisted Mohammed Nadir Shah to topple the Tajik King, Habibullah Kalakani. Consequently, Nadir Khan owed much to the tribes of Paktia, these tribal leaders were granted vast war booty and power by the new administration. In fact, the entire greater Loya Paktia region was exempt from mandatory military service, which the rest of the nation (regardless of ethnicity, region, or family) endured.

The Mangal tribal militia was deployed in Northern Afghanistan shortly before Nadir Khan's assassination to oust an Uzbek Muslim resistance fighter, Ibrahimbeg Laqqai, who was using ethnic kin support in Northern Afghanistan against Soviets in his homeland across the Oxus river. Laqqai had been successfully battling Soviet troops, who had taken over his homeland of modern-day Uzbekistan, in what is now known as the Basmachi Movement. During Kalakani's short rule as king, Laqqai was given support in the Northern Tajik and Uzbek communities and thus he recruited locals to fight across the river against the Soviets. Mohammad Nader Khan worried by this, summoned the Mangal tribe, amongst others, armed them with Soviet-supplied weaponry and motivated them by promises of war booty, to being dispatched to the north. Within a few months, with Soviet support and systematic terror against Tajik and Uzbek locals, the Basmachi Movement were brutally crushed in Afghanistan and eventually in Central Asia and driven him back across the Amu river, where Ibrahimbeg Laqqai was subsequently captured and hanged by the Soviets.

The Mangals also played a notable role in the late 20th century history of Afghanistan. The son and grandsons of the Mangals who toppled Habibullah Kalakani were recruited in the Afghan Army and educated in Soviet Military Academies. Consequently, they came back as ideological Communists who eventually joined military corp of the KHALQ faction and overthrew the Monarchy

== Mangal Sub-tribes ==
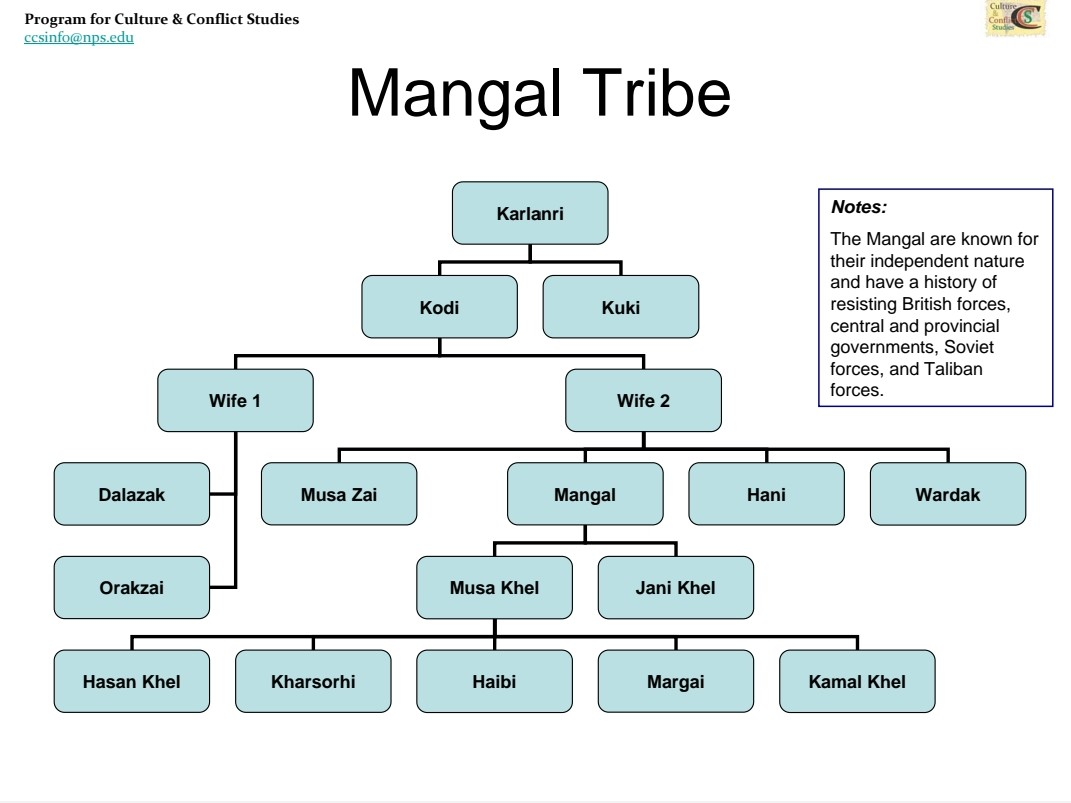
Mangal Family Tree

Messi Khil

1: Hasan khil

2: Khujuri

3: Haibi

4: Margai

5: Kamal Khil

6: Meral Khil

Jani Khil

1: Kamazi

2: Darman Khil

3: sulimen khil

4: Lama Khil

== See also ==
- Tari Mangal
- Loya Paktia
- Pirdil Khel, Bannu
- Fatima Khel, Bannu
- Surrani, Bannu
- Haji Aseel Khan Mangal

== Sources ==
- Henry Walter Bellew. An inquiry into the ethnography of Afghanistan
