= Khost rebellion (1856–1857) =

Anti-Taxation revolt

- Part of Campaigns of Dost Mohammad Khan
Date	1856–1857
Location	Khost
Result	Barakzai Afghan withdrawal: Rebellion subsidized

Belligerents
Emirate of Afghanistan	Khosti tribes Darwesh Khel Wazirs

Commanders and leaders
Ghulam Muhammad; Mohammad Hashim Khan	Unknown

Strength
Unknown	5,000–6,000

The Khost Rebellion of 1856–1857 was an armed uprising by the Khostwal Pashtun tribes, with the participation of the Darwesh Khel Wazirs, against the Emirate of Afghanistan. The rebellion was directed against state revenue demands, administrative abuses, and actions perceived as violations of Pashtun honor, particularly land confiscations and the abduction of local women.

== Background ==
During the mid-nineteenth century, the Muhammadzai rulers of Afghanistan sought to extend effective state control over the eastern frontier regions, including Khost. This policy involved the imposition of regular revenue payments, the appointment of state officials, and the construction of government forts. These measures conflicted with local tribal autonomy and were strongly resisted by the population.

In 1856, Na'ib Ghulam Muhammad Khan governed Khost on behalf of the Muhammadzai administration. His rule was widely regarded as oppressive, particularly due to revenue enforcement and the sequestration of lands whose owners had fled, reportedly to evade taxation.

== Rebellion ==
In early 1856, resistance escalated into open rebellion. In February, minor clashes occurred between government forces and tribal groups. By March, an estimated 5,000 to 6,000 Khostwals and Wazirs besieged the fort of Khost. Early reports reaching Kabul suggested that the primary aim of the siege was to eliminate the permanent physical presence of the Muhammadzai administration in the region.

Mediation was undertaken by Sahibzada Ziya al-Din, a religious figure respected in both Khost and Waziristan. Following negotiations, the Khost tribes declared themselves willing to resume revenue payments under three conditions:

1. Na'ib Ghulam Muhammad Khan would be removed from office.
2. Lands sequestered by the government would be returned to their original owners.
3. Government forts in Khost would be abandoned and their garrisons withdrawn.

These conditions were accepted by the son of Sardar Muhammad A‘zam Khan, who was operating in the area on behalf of the central government. Despite this concession, the rebellion continued.

== Escalation and expulsion of officials ==
In July 1856, government revenue officials were driven out of Khost, reportedly stripped of their possessions and weapons. Kabul subsequently ordered that no further revenue demands be pursued temporarily.

Resentment against Na'ib Ghulam Muhammad Khan persisted, however, and in August 1856 he was expelled from Khost by approximately 1,000 attackers. During subsequent negotiations, it emerged that opposition to his rule had been intensified by allegations that he had abducted three local women, an act regarded as a serious violation of tribal honor.

== Causes ==
The rebellion was motivated by more than opposition to taxation alone. Contemporary accounts indicate that the uprising represented a response to what the Khostwals perceived as a twofold assault on Pashtun honor interference with tribal land ownership and violations involving women. These actions were seen as incompatible with accepted norms of governance and social conduct in the region.

== Aftermath ==
The rebellion continued into early 1857 but gradually subsided following the withdrawal of government officials and the suspension of revenue collection. Although Muhammadzai authority was formally restored, effective state control over Khost remained limited, and the episode highlighted the difficulties faced by the Afghan state in enforcing centralized rule over autonomous tribal regions.
