= List of Afghan flags =

This is a list of flags associated with Afghanistan.

== National flag ==
Flag	Date	Use	Description
Islamic Emirate of Afghanistan (ruling government)
	15 August 2021 – present	National flag	The Arabic Shahada in black on a white field in the calligraphic Thuluth script.
	15 August 2021 – present	National flag	The Arabic Shahada and "Islamic Emirate of Afghanistan" in Pashto in black on a white field in the calligraphic Thuluth script.
Islamic Republic of Afghanistan (internationally-recognized former government)
	19 August 2013 – present	National flag	Three vertical bands of black, red, and green with the national emblem in white, centered on the red band and slightly overlapping the black and green bands.

== Standards of the head of state ==
Flag	Date	Use	Description
Former
	2004–2021	Standard of the President of Afghanistan under Ashraf Ghani and Hamid Karzai.	A black flag with a red circle with a white contour drawing of the national emblem in 2004 version.
	2004	Standard of the President of Afghanistan under Ashraf Ghani and Hamid Karzai.	A black flag with a red circle with a white contour drawing of the national emblem in 1990s version.
	1974–1978	Standard of the President of Afghanistan under Mohammad Daoud Khan.	A red flag with a black circle with a red drawing of the national emblem.
	1933–1973	Standard of the King of Afghanistan under Mohammad Zahir Shah (obverse and reverse).	National emblem on a red background on the obverse and royal tughra on the reverse.
	1931–1933	Standard of the King of Afghanistan under Mohammad Nadir Shah (obverse and reverse).	National emblem on a red background on the obverse and royal tughra on the reverse.
	1926–1929	Standard of the King of Afghanistan under Amanullah Khan (obverse and reverse).	Amanullah Khan's emblem on a red background on the obverse and royal tughra on the reverse. The emblem consists of two crossed swords, a headdress called kolah and a star, and all these elements were removed from the national emblem around the coronation of Amarullah as the first king of Afghanistan.

== Loya jirga/Majlis ==
Flag	Date	Use	Description
Former
	2003	Flag of the 2003 loya jirga.	White flag with emblem. In the green border there are three silhouettes of human heads, turned to the right and imitating the Afghan national colors. Above the profiles is the Arabic Shahada in black, while below is an open book. The profiles are surrounded by a wreath of wheat ears taken from the national emblem.

== Military flags ==
Flag	Date	Use	Description
Current
	2021–present	Flag of the Ministry of Defense of Afghanistan	White flag with the emblem of the Ministry of Defense.
Former
	?–2021	Flag of the Ministry of Defense of Afghanistan	Red flag with the emblem of the Ministry of Defense in a monochrome gold version.
	2004–2021	Flag of the 209th Corps	
	2004–2021	Flag of the 205th Corps	
	2004–2021	Flag of the 207th Corps	
	2011–2021	Flag of the ANA Special Operations Command	
	2015–2021	Flag of the Resolute Support Mission	A green flag with the official mission logo.
	2001–2014	Flags of the International Security Assistance Force	A green flag with the official mission logo.
	2001–2014	Flags of the International Security Assistance Force	A white flag with the official mission logo.

=== Army ===
Flag	Date	Use	Description
Current
	2021–present	Flag of the Afghan Army	
Former
	1987–1992	Flag of the Afghan Army	
	1974–1980	Flag of the Afghan Army	
	c. 1961—?	Flag of the Afghan Army	
	?–1973	Flag of the Afghan Army	
	1920s	Flag of the Afghan Army	
	?–1973	Flag of the royal guard	

=== Air Force ===
Flag	Date	Use	Description
Current
	2021–present	Flag of the Afghan Air Force	
Former
	?–2021	Flag of the Afghan Air Force	

== Law enforcement ==
=== Police ===
Flag	Date	Use	Description
Current
Link to file	2021–present	Flag of the Afghan National Police	Blue background with the police emblem on it.
Former
	2001–2021	Flag of the Afghan National Police	Blue background with the police emblem on it.

=== Customs Department ===
Flag	Date	Use	Description
Current
Link to file	c 2024–present	Flag of the Afghanistan Customs Department	
Former
	2021–c 2024	Flag of the Customs service of Afghanistan	
	?–2021	Flag of the Customs service of Afghanistan	

=== Supreme Audit Office ===
Flag	Date	Use	Description
	2020–present	Flag of the Supreme Audit Office of Afghanistan	

== Ministries ==
Flag	Date	Use	Description
Current
Link to file	2021–present	Flag of the Ministry of Agriculture, Irrigation and Livestock	
Link to file	?–present	Flag of the Ministry of Commerce and Industry	
Link to file	c 2024–present	Flag of the Ministry of Communications and Information Technology	
Link to file	?–present	Flag of the Afghanistan National Disaster Management Authority	
Link to file	?–present	Flag of the Afghan Ministry of Economy	
	2021–present	Flag of the Ministry of Education	
Link to file	?–present	Flag of the Afghan Ministry of Energy and Water	
Link to file	c 2021–present	Flag of the Ministry of Finance	
Link to file	?–present	Flag of the Ministry of Borders and Tribal Affairs	
Link to file	?–present	Flag of the Ministry of Hajj and Religious Affairs	
Link to file	?–present	Flag of the Ministry of Higher Education	
Link to file	?–present	Flag of the Ministry of Information and Culture	
Link to file	c 2021–present	Flag of the Ministry of Justice	
Link to file	?–present	Flag of the Ministry of Martyrs and Disabled Affairs	
Link to file	2021–present	Flag of the Ministry of Mines and Petroleum	
Link to file	2021–present	Flag of the Ministry for the Propagation of Virtue and the Prevention of Vice	
Link to file	2021–present	Flag of the Ministry of Public Health	
Link to file	?–present	Flag of the Ministry of Public Works	
Link to file	?–present	Flag of the Ministry of Refugee and Repatriation	
Link to file	?–present	Flag of the Ministry of Rural Rehabilitation and Development	
Link to file	?–present	Flag of the Ministry of Transport and Civil Aviation	
Link to file	?–present	Flag of the Ministry of Urban Development and Housing	
Former
	?–2021	Flag of the Ministry of Agriculture, Irrigation and Livestock	
Link to file	?–2024	Flag of the Ministry of Communications and Information Technology	
Link to file	?–2021	Flag of the Ministry of Justice	
	?–2021	Flag of the Ministry of Urban Development and Housing	

== Olympic Committee ==
Flag	Date	Use	Description
Current
	2021–present?	Flag of the National Olympic Committee of the Islamic Republic of Afghanistan	A white flag with the Republic's tricolor flag, the inscription "Afghanistan", and the Olympic rings.
Former
	2001–2021	Flag of the National Olympic Committee of the Islamic Republic of Afghanistan	A white flag with the Olympic rings and inscription "National Olympic Committee of Afghanistan".
	1930s	Flag of the National Olympic Committee of the Kingdom of Afghanistan	A flag of unknown colors used at the Berlin Olympics contains a kolah and Olympic rings.

== Historical flags ==
Flag	Date	Use	Description
National flags
	2004–2013	Flag of the Transitional Islamic State of Afghanistan	Main article: Flag of Afghanistan § Twenty-seventh flag (2004–2013)
	2002–2004	Flag of the Transitional Islamic State of Afghanistan	Main article: Flag of Afghanistan § Twenty-sixth flag (2002–2004)
	2001–2002	Flag of the Islamic State of Afghanistan	Main article: Flag of Afghanistan § Twenty-fourth flag (2001–2002)
	1997–2001	Flag of the Islamic Emirate of Afghanistan (variant)	Main article: Flag of Afghanistan § Twenty-third flag (1997–2001)
	1996–1997	Flag of the Islamic Emirate of Afghanistan	Main article: Flag of Afghanistan § Twenty-second flag (1996–1997)
	1992–2001	Flag of the Islamic State of Afghanistan	Main article: Flag of Afghanistan § Twenty-first flag (1992–2002)
	1992	Flag of the Islamic State of Afghanistan	Main article: Flag of Afghanistan § Twentieth flag (1992)
	1987–1992	Flag of the Republic of Afghanistan	Main article: Flag of Afghanistan § Nineteenth flag (1987–1992)
	1980–1987	Flag of the Democratic Republic of Afghanistan	Main article: Flag of Afghanistan § Eighteenth flag (1980–1987)
	1978–1980	Flag of the Democratic Republic of Afghanistan	Main article: Flag of Afghanistan § Seventeenth flag (1978–1980)
	1978	Flag of the Democratic Republic of Afghanistan	Main article: Flag of Afghanistan § Sixteenth flag (1978)
	1974–1978	Flag of the Republic of Afghanistan	Main article: Flag of Afghanistan § Fifteenth flag (1974–1978)
	1973–1974	Flag of the Republic of Afghanistan	Main article: Flag of Afghanistan § Fourteenth flag (1973–1974)
	1931–1973	Flag of the Kingdom of Afghanistan	Main article: Flag of Afghanistan § Thirteenth flag (1930–1973))
	1929–1931	Flag of the Kingdom of Afghanistan	Main article: Flag of Afghanistan § Twelfth flag (1929–1931)
	1929	Flag of the Kingdom of Afghanistan	Main article: Flag of Afghanistan § Eleventh flag (1929)
	1929	Flag of the Emirate of Afghanistan	Main article: Flag of Afghanistan § Tenth flag (1929–1931)
	1929–1931	Flag of the Emirate of Afghanistan, used in Herat	Main article: Flag of Afghanistan § Tenth flag (1929–1931)
	1929	Flag of the Kingdom of Afghanistan	Main article: Flag of Afghanistan § Ninth flag (1929)
	1929 and 1926–1928	Flag of the Kingdom of Afghanistan	Main article: Flag of Afghanistan § Fifth flag (1926–1928)
	1928–1929	Flag of the Kingdom of Afghanistan (possible appearance)	Main article: Flag of Afghanistan § Seventh flag (1928–1929))
	1928	Flag of the Kingdom of Afghanistan	Main article: Flag of Afghanistan § Sixth flag (1928)
	1921–1926/29	Flag of the Emirate of Afghanistan	Main article: Flag of Afghanistan § Fourth flag (1921–1926/29)
	1919–1921	Flag of the Emirate of Afghanistan	Main article: Flag of Afghanistan § Third flag (1919–1921/29)
	1901–1919	Flag of the Emirate of Afghanistan	Main article: Flag of Afghanistan § Second flag (1901–1919)
	1880–1901	Flag of the Emirate of Afghanistan	Main article: Flag of Afghanistan § Black Standard in central Asia and the first flag
	1709–1738	Flag of the Hotak dynasty	Main article: Flag of Afghanistan § Black Standard in central Asia and the first flag
	1818–1856	Flag of the Principality of Kandahar	
	1747–1801, 1803–1809, 1839–1842	Flag of the Durrani Empire	
	1801–1803, 1809–1818	Flag of the Durrani Empire	
	1818–1823	Flag of the Herat State	Main article: Flag of Afghanistan § Herat flag (1818–1842)
Subnational flags
	1996	Flag of the Islamic Emirate of Badakhshan	
	1991	Flag of the Islamic Emirate of Kunar	
Other
	c. 1842	Pashtun banner captured at Jellalabad	An example of a Pashtun tribal battle flag. A red triangular banner with the Shahada and a green border; woven red and yellow fringes were also present on the edges.
	c. 1839	Pashtun banner captured at Ghazni	An example of a Pashtun tribal battle flag. Written are the names of the first four caliphs placed opposite each other (Abu Bakr أَبُو بَكْرٍ, ‘Umar عُمَر, Uthman عُثْمَان, and Ali عَلِيّ).

== Political flags ==
=== Political parties flags ===
Flag	Date	Use	Description
Current
	2005–?	Flag of Hezbollah Afghanistan	Green field with yellow Arabic calligraphy arranged in an arc. The inscription "In the name of God, the Most Gracious, the Most Merciful". Under the arc is also the name of the organization written in white.
	2004–present	Flag of the Communist (Maoist) Party of Afghanistan	Red flag with a yellow star in the canton.
	2004–present	Flag of the People's Islamic Unity Party of Afghanistan	
Link to file	2003–present	Flag of the National United Party of Afghanistan	Party emblem on blue background.
	1997–present	Flag of the Watan Party of Afghanistan	Party emblem on blue background.
Link to file	1992–present	Flag of National Islamic Movement of Afghanistan	National flag from 1974–1978 with the party emblem instead of the national emblem
	1989–present	Flag of Hezbe Wahdat	Party emblem on blue background.
	1979–present	Flag of the National Islamic Front of Afghanistan	A black flag with a gold emblem in the canton. The emblem consists of crossed swords, a wreath of wheat, and the Takbir.
	1972–present	Flag of Jamiat-e Islami	Green flag with a white emblem.
	1976–present	Flag of Hezb-e Islami Gulbuddin	Green flag with a white emblem. The emblem contains many symbols of the national emblem, including an open Quran. There is also the Shahada under the emblem.
Former
	1975–1979	Flag of Hezbi Islami	Green flag with a white emblem. The emblem contains many symbols of the national emblem, including an open Quran.
	1965–1992	Flag of the People's Democratic Party of Afghanistan	Red flag with gold party emblem in the canton. The emblem consists of an ear of wheat superimposed on a gear wheel, symbolizing farmers and workers. Another variant of the party's flag briefly served as the national flag.
	1965–1992	Flag of the Democratic Youth Organisation of Afghanistan	A red flag with the emblem moved towards the mast. The emblem consisted of PDPA symbols, a clenched fist, schematic mountains, and a red star.

=== Rebel groups flags ===
This table does not include flags derived from rebels that became national flags. Such cases occurred once during the Saqqawists period in 1929 and twice in connection with the Taliban takeovers in 1996 and 2021.

Flag	Date	Use	Description
Current
	2021–present	Flag of the National Resistance Front	A variant of the 1990s flag used by Northern Alliance.
	2023–present	Flag of the Afghan United Front	A modified Daoud Republic-era eagle on a dark background.
	2026–present	Flag of the Homeland Corps Front	
	2022	Flag of the Southern Turkestan Movement	Red-blue-green tricolor with the white crescent moon and a star on a blue stripe. The star and crescent resembles the Kök Bayraq flag.
	2015–present	Flag used by the Islamic State – Khorasan Province and pro IS Islamic Movement of Uzbekistan factions	The flag consists of the Black Standard with white text of the first part of the Shahada emblazoned across the top and the second part of the shahada in the form of a depiction of the supposedly historical seal of Muhammad.
	2014	Flag of the Hazarajat Freedom Movement	Two-color white and blue flag divided at 1/3 of its length from the hoist with a wavy pattern.
	2006–present	Flag of Jamaat Ansarullah	
	1988–present	Flag of the Turkistan Islamic Party	White text of the Shahada above a white crescent moon and a star on a blue background. The star and crescent comes from the Kök Bayraq flag, while the Shahada symbolizes Islam.
	1979–present	Flag used by the Sacrifice Front (2013–present), Al-Qaeda (1988–present), Jamaat al-Dawah ila al-Quran wal-Sunnah (1986–present), Islamic Movement of Uzbekistan (1998–2015), Maktab al-Khidamat (1984–1988) and the Afghan mujahideen during the Soviet–Afghan War	The flag consists of the Black Standard with white text of the Shahada emblazoned across it in calligraphy style writing.
Link to file	1970s–present	Flag of the Afghanistan Liberation Organization	A red flag with three raised hands, holding a hammer, a sickle, and a gun respectively.
Former
	1916–1934	Flag of the Basmachi movement	Red and white horizontal stripes, on the hoist side there is an orange rectangle with a white crescent moon and five-pointed star.
	1979	Flag associated with the Herat uprising	A green flag with a white Takbir inscription.
Link to file	1987–1989	Flag of Hezbollah was used by several factions of Tehran Eight	
	1996–2026	Flag of Lashkar-e-Jhangvi	The flag is divided into two horizontal sections, where the upper section consists of six equal horizontal white and black stripes. The lower section is red and has a black and white Arabic inscription "We will destroy the kuffar". Below the writing is a stylized sword.

=== Other ===
Flag	Date	Use	Description
	2014	Proposed flag of Khorosan	Yellow-red-violet horizontal tricolor with the inscription "new Khorosan".

== Ethnic groups flags ==
Flag	Date	Use	Description
	2020–present	Flag of Hazaristan	Blue-white-yellow horizontal tricolor; the colors symbolizes the Hazara people's roots and origin, sky, their loyalty, long winter in Hazaristan, their future and development
	1947–present	Flag of Pashtunistan	
	?–present	Flag of Pashayi people	

== See also ==
- Flag of Afghanistan
- Emblem of Afghanistan
