= Former Salafist states in Afghanistan =

Former unrecognized states in Afghanistan

Various Salafist states appeared during the Soviet–Afghan War and in the following period of civil war, breaking away from the Democratic Republic of Afghanistan. The Salafist ideology was disseminated in Afghanistan by Saudi supporters of the Afghan resistance, who required ideological conformity from the Afghans in exchange for aid. These states would often come under attack not just from the Soviets and the DRA but also by other Mujahedeen factions who were opposed to Saudi influence such as Hezb-e Islami Gulbuddin.

== Salafist quasi-states ==
Several prominent men among the Salafist converts returned to Afghanistan and formed small localized states with fellow Afghan Salafists, often again with the aid of foreign backers.

- In Nuristan, Mawlawi Afzal formed the Islamic Revolutionary State of Nuristan
- In Kunar, Jamil al-Rahman, a former Hezb-e Islami Gulbuddin member, broke off from his party and formed the Islamic Emirate of Kunar ruled by his new organisation Jamaat al-Dawah ila al-Quran wal-Sunnah. The state was dismembered by forces of Gulbuddin Hekmatyar and the Afghan military.
- In Badakhshan, Mawlawi Shariqi formed a Islamic Emirate of Badakhshan

== Sources ==
- Ed Darack. Victory Point: Operations Red Wings and Whalers – The Marine Corps' Battle for Freedom in Afghanistan. Penguin Group, 2009. ISBN 0-425-22619-0, ISBN 978-0-425-22619-3.
- Olivier Roy, Carol Volk. The Failure of Political Islam. Harvard University Press, 1996. ISBN 0-674-29141-7, ISBN 978-0-674-29141-6.
