= Islamic emirate (disambiguation) =

An Islamic emirate is a form of government in the Islamic world in which an emirate is also an Islamic state governed by Sharia, often with theocratic elements.

States and groups called Islamic emirates:

- Afghanistan, currently an Islamic emirate
  - Taliban, the jihadist group which established the Islamic Emirate of Afghanistan
  - Government of Afghanistan, frequently referred to as "the Islamic Emirate"
  - Islamic Emirate of Afghanistan (1996–2001), The first Taliban government
- Islamic Emirate of Badakhshan
- Islamic Emirate of Kurdistan
- Islamic Emirate of Rafah
- Islamic Emirate of Kunar
- Caucasus Emirate
- Islamic Emirate of Yemen
- Islamic Emirate of Rafah
- Islamic Wilayah of Somalia, also known as the Islamic Emirate of Somalia

== See also ==
- Islamic republic
- Muslim world
- Caliphate
- Theocracy
- Sharia
