= Sabar Lal Melma =

Afghan Guantanamo detainee

- Born: 1962; Kunar
- Arrested: 2002-08; US Forces
- Released: 2007-08
- Died: September 3, 2011; Jalalabad
- Citizenship: Afghanistan
- Detained at: BTIF, Guantanamo
- ISN: 801
- Charge: extrajudicial detention
- Status: repatriated, killed
- Spouse: two wives
- Children: nine children

Sabar Lal Melma (1962 – 3 September 2011) was a citizen of Afghanistan who was held in extrajudicial detention in the United States Guantanamo Bay detainment camps, in Cuba. Sabar Lal Melma's Guantanamo Internment Serial Number was 801. American intelligence analysts estimate that Sabar Lal Melma was born in 1962, at Darya-e-Pech, Afghanistan.

According to Ray Riviera of the New York Times, Sabar's killing angered officials on the Afghanistan High Peace Council, a body appointed by Afghanistan President Hamid Karzai to address Taliban fighters. The Peace Council believed they had secured assurances that coalition forces would stop bothering Sabar Lal Melma, and they believed his killing would frighten other Taliban fighters from defecting. A spokesman for the NATO-led military coalition said that security forces had never "detained him or had him in custody" until the operation that resulted in his death.

== Combatant Status Review Tribunal ==
Combatant Status Review Tribunals were held in a trailer the size of a large RV. The captive sat on a plastic garden chair, with his hands and feet shackled to a bolt in the floor. Three chairs were reserved for members of the press, but only 37 of the 574 Tribunals were observed.

Initially the Bush administration asserted that they could withhold all the protections of the Geneva Conventions to captives from the war on terror. This policy was challenged before the Judicial branch. Critics argued that the USA could not evade its obligation to conduct a competent tribunal to determine whether captives are, or are not, entitled to the protections of prisoner of war (POW) status.

Subsequently the Department of Defense instituted the Combatant Status Review Tribunals. The Tribunals, however, were not authorized to determine whether the captives were lawful combatants—rather they were merely empowered to make a recommendation as to whether the captive had previously been correctly determined to match the Bush administration's definition of an enemy combatant.

Sabar Lal Melma chose to participate in his Combatant Status Review Tribunal.

=== Allegations ===
The allegations Sabar Lal Melma faced during his Tribunal were:

a. The detainee is associated with al Qaeda and the Taliban:
1. The detainee aided al Qaida members in their escape from coalition forces.
2. The detainee had bodyguards.
3. The detainee called for a jihad against the United States.
4. The detainee assisted in the escape of Usama Bin Laden from Tora Bora.
5. The detainee was one of Usama Bin Laden's commanders during the Soviet jihad.
6. The detainee collaborated with regional al Qaida leadership.

b. The detainee supported military operation against the United States and its coalition partners.
1. The detainee coordinated a rocket attack against United States forces.

== Administrative Review Board hearing ==
Detainees who were determined to have been properly classified as "enemy combatants" were scheduled to have their dossier reviewed at annual Administrative Review Board hearings. The Administrative Review Boards were not authorized to review whether a detainee qualified for POW status, and they were not authorized to review whether a detainee should have been classified as an "enemy combatant".

They were authorized to consider whether a detainee should continue to be detained by the United States, because they continued to pose a threat—or whether they could safely be repatriated to the custody of their home country, or whether they could be set free.

Sabar Lal Melma chose to participate in his Administrative Review Board hearing.

=== Factors for continued detention ===
- The detainee is a Brigadier General in the Afghan military. He is suspected of assisting al Qaeda members to escape from Tora Bora into Pakistan. He was a commander of 600 border security troops in Konar, Afghanistan.
- The detainee is a member of Jamiat-e-Dawa-el-al-Qurani Wasouna [sic] (JDQ).
- The detainee has met with Haji Rohullah, leader of Jamiat-e-Dawa-el-al Qurani Wasouna [sic], and Loya Jirga, representative for the Konar region, on numerous occasions.
- Jamiat-ul-Dawa-ul-Qurani [sic], an Islamic extremist group with ties to the Pakistani Inter-Service Intelligence Directorate, consisted of Afghan refugees from camps in the Peshawar area. This organization supported the continued war in Kashmir.
- The detainee’s military service includes being appointed the title of Brigadier General due to his experience fighting against the Soviet Union and the Taliban.
- During the fight against the Taliban, the detainee was Nasruldeen’s commander. Nasruldeen was allegedly responsible for attacks on government and coalition entities.
- The detainee knew Faquirullah. He knew Faquirullah was possibly involved with the Jam’ at Islami, was a high level commander for the Hezb-e Islami Gulbuddin (HIG), and a dedicated Mujahideen.
- HIG has long-established ties with Osama bin Laden. In the early 1990s, it ran several terrorist training camps in Afghanistan and pioneered sending mercenary fighters to other Islamic conflicts. It offered shelter to Osama bin Laden after the latter fled Sudan in 1996.
- The detainee met Ali (NFT) twice in the Konar region, and twice in Jalalabad, Afghanistan. The detainee confirmed Ali was a member of the Hezb-e Islami Khalis under Yunis Khalis.
- Around 15–16 November 2001, nine Arabs, two of whom were wounded, fled Tora Bora for Konar Province, Afghanistan. The detainee assigned one of his leaders to personally handle the security for the Arabs.
- The detainee arranged for the nine men to be transferred to his fort, where they awaited the arrival of Haji Rohullah. When he arrived, Rohullah provided the detainee with an unspecified amount of money and instructions to smuggle the Arabs in Pakistan. The Arabs’ weapons and the truck were given to the detainee as a reward.

=== Factors against continued detention ===
- The detainee denied having any knowledge of the attacks in the United States prior to their execution on September 11 and also denied having knowledge of any rumors or plans of future attacks on the United States.

== Repatriation ==
Sabar Lal Melma was repatriated on September 28, 2007, along with five other Afghans, a Libyan captive and a Yemeni captive.

The Center for Constitutional Rights reports that all of the Afghans repatriated to Afghanistan from April 2007 were sent to Afghan custody in the American-built and supervised wing of the Pul-e-Charkhi prison near Kabul.

== McClatchy interview ==
On June 15, 2008 the McClatchy News Service published articles based on interviews with 66 former Guantanamo captives. McClatchy reporters interviewed Sabar Lal. Sabar Lal said he had been an anti-Taliban fighter during their administration, that he suffered a gunshot wound during his opposition to the Taliban, and that he had helped oust the Taliban during the American invasion.

Lal reported being subjected to sleep deprivation in Bagram.

The McClatchy report quoted an Afghan official named Mohammed Roze, who acknowledged Lal had served as the commander of a border patrol, but that he nevertheless belonged in Guantanamo, because he had bombarded settlements full of civilians during regional disputes. The report quoted Mateullah Khan, the chief of police of Konar Province who asserted Sabar Lal had helped militants escape.

But the report also quoted Jonathan Horowitz, an investigator with a human rights group, who had secured access to Lal's confidential file. He said it contained practically no evidence to back up the allegations against him.

Sabar was killed by Afghan and NATO security forces in Kabul, Afghanistan on 9/3/11. As of September 4, 2011 Sabar could no longer be located on the McClatchy Guantanamo Inmate Database.

== Accounts of his death on Friday September 3 ==
NATO officials reported that an individual named Sabar Lal Melma was shot dead during a night raid on his home in Jalalabad on September 3, 2011. According to those officials, he emerged from his home carrying an AK-47. The officials went on to say Sabar had been organizing attacks and financing al Qaeda operations. However, in a CNN interview with Haji Sahib Rohullah Wakil, a tribal leader who had been captured with Sabar in 2002, Mr. Wakil asserted Lal Melma "chose a civilian life" after his release from Guantanamo.

Ray Riviera, writing in the New York Times on September 4, 2011, reported that Sabar's killing came just two days after coalition forces had promised the Afghanistan High Peace Council that they would quit harassing him. Riviera reported that Sabar had been apprehended by NATO forces as recently as one month earlier. However NATO forces denied either promising to stop harassing Sabar, or that they had recently taken him into custody. Riviera of the New York Times quoted Haji Deen Muhammad of the Peace Council about how the killing of Sabar would affect efforts to get members of the Taliban to defect.

"It really hurts the prestige of the Peace Council among the people of Afghanistan. More importantly, those Taliban members who were released through our process are going to have big concerns that this will happen to them."

In September 2011, the International Security Assistance Force (ISAF) issued a press release stating they had knowledge that Lal Melma was "in contact with several senior al Qaeda members throughout Kunar and Pakistan"
