= Mawlawi Afzal =

Mawlawi Mohammad Afzal (born c. 1925 – 2012) was a Panjpiri-educated Afghan clergyman of the Kam tribe from Barg-i-Matal, Nuristan Province. He studied in Deoband, and later at Akora, Pakistan, before teaching at a madrassa in Karachi, and then in his native village of Badmuk.

Following the Saur Revolution of 1978 in Afghanistan, Afzal established a Salafist mini-state in northern Nuristan, known as the Islamic Revolutionary State of Afghanistan, with consulates in Saudi Arabia and Pakistan. Though Nuristan was generally a mujahideen area, Afzal was among those leaders who were at least temporarily co-opted by the DRA communist government. In the 1980s, Afzal was among those Nuristani leaders who, after initially supporting him, expelled the southern Nuristan military leader Sarwar Nuristani, suspecting him of supporting the Communist government. With the arrival of the Taliban in the mid-1990s, Afzal aligned himself with that movement, and received their support.

== See also ==
- Former Salafist states in Afghanistan
