= Abdul Rahim Muslim Dost =

Afghan militant and founding member of ISIS-K (born 1960)

- عبد الرحیم مسلم دوست
- Born: 1960 (age 65–66); Jalalabad, Kingdom of Afghanistan
- Military career
- Allegiance: Ikhwan (1979–1980); JDQS (1986–1990s) (Afghanistan) Taliban (1990s–2014); ISIS–K (2014–late 2015); ISIS (late 2015–2016) (Afghanistan) Taliban (2016–present)
- Service number: 561 (Internment Serial Number)
- Conflicts: Grand Mosque Seizure; Soviet–Afghan War; War in Afghanistan; Taliban insurgency; Insurgency in Khyber Pakhtunkhwa

Abdul Rahim Muslim Dost (Urdu: عبد الرحیم مسلم دوست; born 1960) is an Afghan Salafi jihadist militant who served primarily with the Taliban, and later, as a founding member of ISIS–K. Dost's militancy began by age 19, when he left Afghanistan to join the Ikhwan, carrying out the Grand Mosque seizure in Mecca, Saudi Arabia before most of the group were captured and executed, though Dost escaped to Peshawar, Khyber Pakhtunkhwa, Pakistan. By 1986, he had returned to Afghanistan to fight in the Soviet–Afghan War as a member of Jamaat al-Dawah ila al-Quran wal-Sunnah, a Salafist forerunner to the Taliban. Following the Soviet withdrawal, he joined the Taliban as they ascended to power in the 1990s.

During the US invasion of Afghanistan in 2001, Dost was arrested and held in the US detention camp at Guantanamo Bay, Cuba, where he was noted for his poetic writings. In April 2005, he was released following a Combatant Status Review Tribunal, and returned to Peshawar, but was quickly recaptured by the Pakistani ISI, before ultimately being released in a prisoner exchange between Pakistani government and the Pakistani Taliban (TTP) in 2008.

From his release from Pakistani custody through 2014, he was active with the Taliban in the Afghanistan-Pakistan border region, until swearing allegiance to the Islamic State's Khorasan Province in 2014. In late 2015 he purportedly left ISIS–K and the life of militancy, publicly condemning the group's emir, Hafiz Saeed Khan, as "illiterate" for approving attacks on civilians, however he reportedly maintains his allegiance to the Islamic State and its leader Abu Bakr al-Baghdadi.

== History ==
In 1979, Dost was among those, led by Juhayman al-Otaybi, who were involved in the Grand Mosque seizure in Mecca, Saudi Arabia. He was arrested after the Saudi government stormed the Mosque, but was somehow freed and fled to Peshawar, Pakistan.

== 2001 capture by the United States ==
Muslim Dost and his brother were captured on November 17, 2001, and later released on 17 April 2005 with no charges held against him. His Guantanamo Internment Serial Number was 561.

The allegations against Muslim Dost, in his Combatant Status Review Tribunal, were that he was a member of the Jamaat al Dawa al Quran (JDQ) militant group, and served as a contact between that group and Al Qaeda. Muslim Dost acknowledged being a member of JDQ, but said he had joined long ago, during the Soviet invasion of Afghanistan.

Muslim Dost's brother who was also a journalist, and was also held in extrajudicial detention in Guantanamo, was also released by the Americans following his Tribunal. Their presence in Guantanamo was discussed in the press prior the Department of Defense released the official list of detainee identities.

Just as the heart beats in the darkness of the body, so I, despite this cage, continue to beat with life. Those who have no courage or honour consider themselves free, but they are slaves. I am flying on the wings of thought, and so, even in this cage, I know a greater freedom.

— Abdul Rahim Muslim Dost

He has been noted for his poetry while detained by the American government and the lengths he went to to record it, ranging from scratching with a spoon onto polystyrene teacups to using rubbery pens, and has received much esteem in this regard. His account on his stay at Guantanamo, The Broken Chains, is currently being translated into English.

=== Determined not to have been an enemy combatant ===
Abdul Rahim Muslim Dost was one of the 38 captives the Bush Presidency determined had not been enemy combatants after all. The Department of Defense refers to these men as No Longer Enemy Combatants.

Abdul Rahim Muslim Dost was freed on April 20, 2005, with sixteen other Afghans whose Tribunals had determined they were not enemy combatants. The Associated Press reported that their release ceremony was addressed by Afghan Chief Justice Fazl Hadi Shinwari. Carlotta Gall of The New York Times reported that the Chief Justice encouraged the men to regard their detention as something sent from God. The reports stated that the Chief Justice warned the cleared men that a candid description of their detention could damage the chances of other Afghan captives to be released.

Don't tell these people the stories of your time in prison because the government is trying to secure the release of others, and it may harm the release of your friends.

Abdul Rahim Muslim Dost was one of the three captives who chose to address the Press. Carlotta Gall described him as openly disagreeing with the Chief Justice as to whether any Afghans should have been sent to Guantanamo:

If we have the government, our government should bring the criminals here. They should be imprisoned here and should be punished here. Why were the Afghans given to the Americans?

We spent more than 3½ years there. If there is a government and a Supreme Court in Afghanistan, why did nobody ask about our situation? If we were guilty we ought to have been brought to stand trial here. Why should America be allowed to ask us questions and interrogate us?

Both reports quoted Chief Justice Fazil Hadi Shinwari distinguishing three categories of captives:

There are three kinds of prisoners in Guantanamo. There are those that have committed crimes and should be there, then there are people who were falsely denounced, and third there are those who are there because of the mistakes of the Americans.

=== Combatant Status Review Tribunal ===
Combatant Status Review Tribunals were held in a trailer the size of a large RV. The captive sat with his hands cuffed and feet shackled to a bolt in the floor.

Initially the Bush administration asserted that they could withhold all the protections of the Geneva Conventions to captives from the war on terror. This policy was challenged before the Judicial branch. Critics argued that the United States could not evade its obligation to conduct competent tribunals to determine whether captives are, or are not, entitled to the protections of prisoner of war status.

Subsequently, the Department of Defense instituted the Combatant Status Review Tribunals. The Tribunals, however, were not authorized to determine whether the captives were lawful combatants—rather they were merely empowered to make a recommendation as to whether the captive had previously been correctly determined to match the Bush administration's definition of an enemy combatant.

=== Summary of Evidence memo ===
A Summary of Evidence memo was prepared for Abdul Rahim Muslim Dost's Combatant Status Review Tribunal, on 29 September 2004.

The memo listed the following allegations against him:

The detainee is associated with forces that engaged in hostilities against the United States and its coalition partners.

1. The detainee voluntarily traveled to Afghanistan in August 2001.
2. The detainee was a member of Jamaat ud Dawa il al Quran al Sunnat [sic] (JDQ).
3. Jamyat-u-Dawa-al-Quarani [sic] (JDQ) conducted training with several types of weapons in the Abdullah Abu Masood camp.
4. The JDQ is a militant religious school which trains students in military camps as well as classrooms. The JDQ has a militant wing and an assassination wing.
5. The detainee reportedly was an Al Qaeda point of contact in Herat, Afghanistan.

=== Transcript ===
Muslim Dost chose to participate in his Combatant Status Review Tribunal. On March 3, 2006, in response to a court order from Jed Rakoff the Department of Defense published a sixteen-page summarized transcript from his Combatant Status Review Tribunal. According to Fox News, the US considered Muslim Dost "too old and sick to get back in the fight" and his intelligence value had been "maxed out".

== 2006 capture by Pakistan ==
On September 30, 2006, the Chinese news agency Xinhua reported that Muslim Dost had been arrested by Pakistani officials. The article quotes Muslim Dost's brother, who linked the arrest to criticisms of the Inter-Services Intelligence Directorate's role in the capture of Guantanamo detainees. Muslim Dost's brother said he was arrested while leaving his Mosque. Local Peshawar Police Superintendent Iftikhar Khan denied any knowledge of Muslim Dost's arrest, but acknowledged Inter-Services Intelligence officials may have executed a covert arrest. In 2008, Muslim Dost was released from detention as part of a prisoner swap between the Pakistani Government and the Pakistani Taliban, who had been holding Pakistan's ambassador to Afghanistan and others hostage.

== Affiliation with the Islamic State ==
In July 2014, Abdul Raheem Muslim Dost swore allegiance to the leader of ISIS, Abu Bakr al-Baghdadi, and began recruiting fighters and distributing propaganda for its Khorasan branch in the Nuristan and Kunar provinces of Afghanistan, parts of the Afghan-Pakistan tribal belt, and in some Afghan refugee camps in Peshawar. In a video released in 2014, Dost claimed to have had a vision about the reestablishment of the Caliphate, while in an interview with a journalist, Dost admitted being a supporter of the group, while denying reports he held an influential position in it.

In late 2015, Dost publicly disassociated himself from ISIS in Khorasan, condemning the group's leadership and killings in Afghanistan. He reportedly maintained his allegiance to Abu Bakr al-Baghdadi and his self-proclaimed Caliphate Islamic State.

== See also ==
- Poems From Guantánamo
