= Jamil al-Rahman =

Islamic scholar and mujahid (1939-1991)

Emir; Mawlawi; Jamil al-Rahman al-Afghani
- جمیل الرحمن الافغاني

1st Leader of the Islamic Emirate of Kunar
- In office 1991–1991
- Preceded by: Office established
- Succeeded by: Office abolished

Personal details
- Born: 1939 Ningalam, Kunar Province, Kingdom of Afghanistan
- Died: 30 August 1991 (aged 51-52)

Military service
- Allegiance: Islamic Emirate of Kunar
- Branch/service: Jamaat al Dawa al Quran
- Years of service: 1980–1991
- Battles/wars: Soviet–Afghan War; Afghan Civil War (1989–1992)

Religious life
- Religion: Islam
- Denomination: Sunni
- Jurisprudence: Independent
- Creed: Athari
- Movement: Ahl-i Hadith

Muslim leader
- Influenced by: Ibn Taymiyya, Muhammad ibn Abd al-Wahhab
- Influenced: Abd al-Aziz ibn Baz, Al-Albani, Muhammad ibn al-Uthaymin, Muqbil bin Hadi al-Wadi'i, Rabee al-Madkhali, Saleh Al-Fawzan, Abd al-Muhsin al-Abbad, Abd Allah al-Ubaylan, Saleh bin Abdul-Aziz Al ash-Sheikh

Mawlawi Muhammad Hussain also known as Jamil al-Rahman al-Afghani (1939–30 August 1991) was the founder and leader of Jamaat al-Dawah ila al-Quran wal-Sunnah, a Salafist organisation located in Kunar Province of Afghanistan. He was also the Emir of the short-lived Islamic Emirate of Kunar.

== Early life ==
Born in 1939 at Ningalam in the Pech valley, Kunar Province, he was a member of the Safi Pashtun tribe, and was educated at the Panjpir madrasah, a Salafi institution financed by Saudi Arabia.

=== Role in the mujahideen insurgency ===
During the 1970s, he joined the Islamist Muslim Youth movement led by Gulbuddin Hekmatyar. In 1978, as a member of Hekmatyar's Hezbi Islami, he journeyed between Kunar and Pakistan, organizing attacks against the Khalq regime, including the killing of a Khalqi schoolteacher. In 1979, after the insurgency had taken hold in Kunar, Jamil al-Rahman became the amir of Hezbi Islami in that province. In order to gain control of the insurgency, he worked to undermine independent mujahideen fronts. In the summer of 1979, he played a controversial role in the mutiny of Afghan Army troops at Asmar, with most of the parties involved blaming him for the failure of the uprising. The soldiers, who had intended to join the mujahideen, eventually dispersed, and their weapons were sold by Hezbi Islami in Pakistan.

=== Establishment of Jamaat al Dawa al Quran ===
In 1985 (or 1986–1987, depending on sources) he established his own movement known as the Jama'at al Da'wa ila al Qur'an wa-Sunna. This group, theologically close to the Jamiat Ahle Hadith, was known for its harsh treatment of civilians in government-controlled areas. Due to his personal background and the proximity of the Bajaur Agency where many Arab militants were active, Jamil al-Rahman was able to secure funding from Saudi Arabia (reportedly from King Fahd himself) and Kuwait, allowing him to operate independently. Many Arab volunteers, in particular Egyptians, joined his movement. They later established the Islamic Emirate of Kunar, before being overthrown by Gulbuddin Hekmatyar.

== Death ==
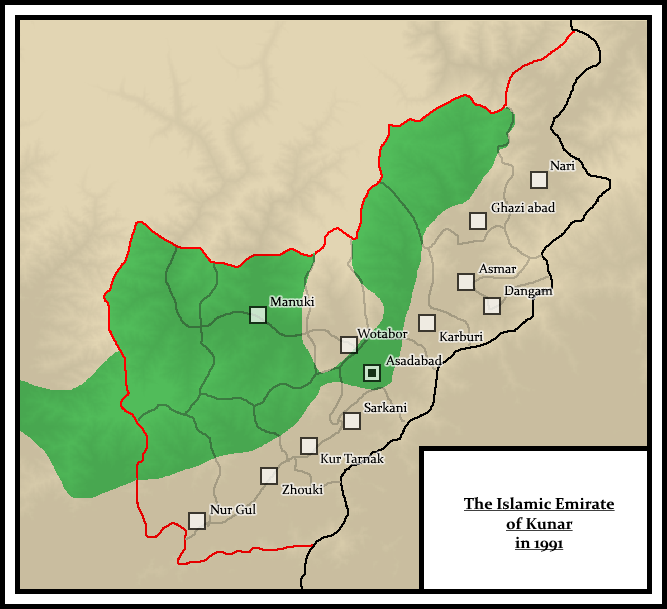
Map of the Islamic Emirate of Kunar in 1991

On August 30, 1991, a young Egyptian journalist named Abdullah Rumi affiliated with the Muslim Brotherhood came to al-Rahman’s home in Bajaur. Al-Rahman’s guards, believing he was part of the Arab-led peace council, did not search him. The young journalist went to al-Rahman’s side where he was seated, as though to ask him a question. He then drew a pistol and shot him three times. Rumi immediately committed suicide without explaining his act. Al-Rahman cried out "Allah is the greatest!" and fell dead.

=== Aftermath ===
Al-Rahman’s death shocked the Saudi royal family, Grand Mufti Bin Baz, and the broader Saudi religious establishment. In spite of his many enemies, al-Rahman’s murder reverberated throughout the Salafi mujahideen community, and his death and the subsequent dissolution of the Islamic Emirate of Kunar was major topic of discussion in Salafi mujahideen communities for years to come. Not long after al-Rahman’s assassination, the state that he founded disappeared.

== See also ==
- Former Salafist states in Afghanistan
