= Sahib Rohullah Wakil =

Afghan Guantanamo detainee

- Born: 1962 (age 63–64); Jalalabad, Afghanistan
- Detained at: Guantanamo
- ISN: 798
- Charge: No charge (held in extrajudicial detention)
- Status: Repatriated May 2, 2008

Hajji Sahib Rohullah Wakil is a citizen of Afghanistan who was held in extrajudicial detention in the United States Guantanamo Bay detention camps, in Cuba. His Guantanamo Internment Serial Number was 798. American intelligence analysts estimate he was born in 1962, in Jalalabad, Afghanistan. He has since been transferred from Guantanamo Bay to the American wing of the Pol-e-Charkhi prison in Kabul, Afghanistan. On November 18, 2019, the U.S. Department of the Treasury designated him for supporting activities of the ISIS branch in Afghanistan.

== Background ==
Sahib Rohullah Wakil, a leader of the Wakil tribe, and a member of Afghanistan's legislature, the Loya Jirga, was captured on Thursday August 22, 2002. According to the New York Times, the night before his capture Rohullah had attended a dinner to honor the newly appointed Governor, and had spoken about al Qaeda. According to the New York Times, Rohullah had acknowledged it was "possible" al Qaeda was regrouping, but that he had his doubts. The article quoted Rohullah: "I told them, 'If there are Al Qaeda, tell us and we'll take care of them. It has been three months, and they haven't caught any Al Qaeda."

== Combatant Status Review Tribunal ==
Combatant Status Review Tribunals were held in a 3 x 6 meter trailer. The captive sat with his hands cuffed and feet shackled to a bolt in the floor. Three chairs were reserved for members of the press, but only 37 of the 574 Tribunals were observed.

Initially, the Bush administration asserted that they could withhold all the protections of the Geneva Conventions to captives from the war on terror. This policy was challenged before the Judicial branch. Critics argued that the USA could not evade its obligation to conduct competent tribunals to determine whether captives are, or are not, entitled to the protections of prisoner of war status.

Subsequently, the Department of Defense instituted the Combatant Status Review Tribunals. The Tribunals, however, were not authorized to determine whether the captives were lawful combatants—rather they were merely empowered to make a recommendation as to whether the captive had previously been correctly determined to match the Bush administration's definition of an enemy combatant.

=== Summary of Evidence memo ===
A Summary of Evidence memo was prepared for Sahib Rohullah Wakil's Combatant Status Review Tribunal, on 25 October 2004. The memo listed the following allegations against him:

The detainee is associated with the Taliban and al Qaida forces;

1. The detainee is an Afghanistan citizen who is a high-ranking member of Jama' AT UL Dawa AL Qurani (JDQ).
2. Jama' AT UL Dawa AL Qurani (JDQ) is an Islamic extremist group operating in Pakistan, which received funds from Non-Governmental Organizations located throughout the Middle East.
3. The detainee received a permit from a Pakistani government official that allowed vehicle convoys to transport food and blankets between the Pakistan and Afghanistan borders in 2001.
4. The detainee helped al Qaida members escape into Pakistan.

=== Transcript ===
Wakil chose to participate in his Combatant Status Review Tribunal. On March 3, 2006, in response to a court order from Jed Rakoff the Department of Defense published a summarized transcript from his Combatant Status Review Tribunal.

=== Administrative Review Board ===
Detainees whose Combatant Status Review Tribunal labeled them "enemy combatants" were scheduled for annual Administrative Review Board hearings. These hearings were designed to assess the threat a detainee might pose if released or transferred, and whether there were other factors that warranted his continued detention.

Wakil chose to participate in his Administrative Review Board hearing.

The following primary factors favor continued detention

a. Commitment

1. The detainee is a member of the Jamaat al Dawa al Quran [sic].
2. The detainee was actively involved in two Jamaat al Dawa al Quran training camps.
3. The detainee attended a meeting with a Foreign Government Agency to develop a plan to conduct double agent operations against the United States.
4. A Foreign Government Agency provided the detainee money to hire a group of men to fire a rocket from the Marawara [sic] region of Konar in a U.S. compound near Asadabad.
5. In December 2001, small groups of Arabs escaped from the Tora Bora and were initially resettled to the Konar Province village of Marah Warah [sic]. The detainee moved the Arabs for their safety.
6. The detainee paid to have a radio antenna installed to facilitate the Arab's communication.
7. The detainee was responsible for members of the Hezb-e-Islami Gulbuddin having access to a cache of light and heavy weapons in the Kamdesh district area.

b. Training

1. The detainee knows how to use an AK-47, pistols and grenades.

c. Connections/Associations

1. The detainee provided another man with money and instructions to smuggle the Arabs into Pakistan.
2. The detainee is a member of an alliance between the Taliban, Hezb-e-Islami Gulbuddin, and Wahhabi to coordinate efforts to drive U.S. Forces from Afghanistan.
3. The detainee received weapons and supplies from al Qaida through the Nawa Pass.

d. Other Relevant Data

1. The detainee stated that the Jamaat al Dawa al Quran is a small organization interested in helping the Afghan people rebuild their lives. The original purpose of the Jamaat al Dawa al Quran was to repel the Russians from Afghanistan.
2. The detainee stated that he no longer fights and the Jamaat al Dawa al Quran does not represent his beliefs in any manner.
3. The detainee traveled to the United Arab Emirates ten times from 1996 to 2002.

The following primary factors favor release or transfer

a. The detainee fought jihad against the Russians and fought against the Taliban and al Qaida at Tora Bora. b. The detainee supported the Northern Alliance in their efforts to defeat the Taliban, al Qaida, and Usama Bin Laden. c. In 1997 or 1998, the detainee traveled to Mazar–e-Sharif [sic] to visit with Massoud. d. The detainee traveled twice to Tajikistan in 1998 in connection with Masood and the Northern Alliance. e. The detainee traveled to Cyprus three times in 1999 to attend international conferences organized by influential expatriate Afghans to increase resistance to the Taliban. f. The detainee states that he never worked with the Arabs or against the Americans.

== Repatriation ==
On April 30, 2008, nine Guantanamo captives were repatriated. The identity of the three Sudanese captives, and the sole Moroccan were made public on the day of their repatriation. The identity of the five Afghans did not immediately become public.

By May 5, 2008, it had become public that a captive named "Haji Rohullah" had been repatriated. Peter M. Ryan, an attorney who had represented many Guantanamo captives, wrote that Rohullah had merely been transferred from US custody to Afghan custody `

On July 14, 2008 Ryan filed a "Motion to sever petition of Haji Rohullah Wakil" from Civil Action No. 05-cv-1124.

The Center for Constitutional Rights reports that all of the Afghans repatriated to Afghanistan from April 2007 were sent to Afghan custody in the American-built and supervised wing of the Pul-e-Charkhi prison near Kabul.

== Pentagon suspect that he had "returned to the fight" ==
On May 20, 2009, the New York Times, citing an unreleased Pentagon document, reported that Department of Defense officials claimed Haji Sahib Rohullah Wakil was one of 74 former Guantanatmo captives who were suspected of "re-engagement in terrorism." Wakil was suspected of re-engagement with terrorism because he was suspected of "an association with terrorist groups."

== July 2009 McClatchy profile ==
Following the publication of claims in May 2009 that Wakil had ""associations with terrorist groups" Nancy A. Youssef, of the McClatchy News Service conducted an investigation into the credibility of these claims. On July 8, 2009, she reported that Wakil was a trusted advisor of the Hamid Karzai administration. She quoted comments from Mirwise Yaseeni, a candidate in the upcoming Afghan presidential elections:

How could he be a terrorist? He is never far off the government's radar. His family is here. I have never known him to do anything criminal.

Wakil says that, following the leaked anonymous allegations, he is worried he may be detained without charge a second time, and that he carries a dossier of documents that establish his innocence. Youssef suggested the doubts Wakil's case cast on the credibility of the DoD claims erodes the credibility of the DoD's claims against other former captives.
