= Islamic Emirate of Kunar =

Former unrecognized state in Afghanistan

Islamic Emirate of Kunar د کونړ اسلامي امارت
- 1989–1991
- Flag

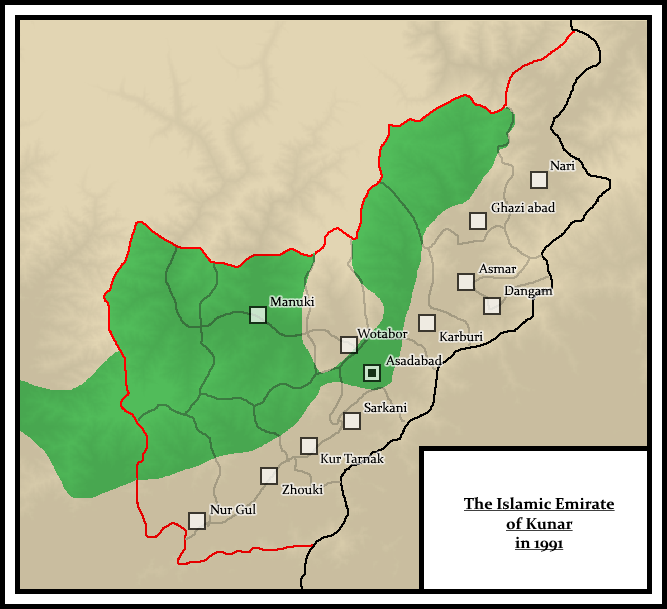
- The Islamic Emirate of Kunar (green) in Kunar Province in 1991
- Status: Unrecognized independent state
- Capital and largest city: Asadabad
- Official languages: Pashto
- Religion: Salafi Sunni Islam
- Demonym: Kunari
- Government: Emirate
- Emir
  - 1989–1991: Jamil al-Rahman
- History
  - Established: 1989
  - Disestablished: 20 April 1991
- Currency: Afghan afghani (de facto)
- Today part of: Afghanistan

The Islamic Emirate of Kunar (Pashto: د کونړ اسلامي امارت) was a short-lived unrecognized quasi-state in Kunar Province, Afghanistan, which was led by Jamil al-Rahman and established by his group, Jamaat al-Dawah ila al-Quran wal-Sunnah. The Islamic Emirate of Kunar was the first modern Islamic state, and it had captured the attention of many Salafis from Arab nations, who ended up either sending money or coming to Afghanistan to join them.

== History ==
After the withdrawal of Soviet troops in 1988, Kunar Province fell entirely under mujahideen control. In the recently captured areas, armed groups committed many atrocities against the civilian population, and fought each other for supremacy over the province. Kunar, which had already suffered heavily during repeated Soviet offensives, was devastated by these clashes. Jamil al-Rahman and his Jamaat al-Dawah ila al-Quran wal-Sunnah forces, at the time made up of mostly Arab volunteers, also with support from many rich Saudi and Kuwaiti businessmen, managed to overpower all their rivals, until the only other remaining force in Kunar was Hezb-e Islami Gulbuddin, led by Gulbuddin Hekmatyar. In March 1990, the two groups agreed to form a joint Shura, but differences quickly reappeared, in particular over the question of the Gulf War. While Hekmatyar took an anti-American, anti-Saudi monarchy stance, Jamil al-Rahman chose to support his Saudi and Kuwaiti patrons.

In January 1991, Jamil al-Rahman proclaimed the creation of the Islamic Emirate of Kunar, which included the northwestern countryside of Kunar Province, including the city of Asadabad, as well as the eastern part of Laghman Province, and the northern part of Nangarhar Province. In addition to the Arabs, there were also Pashtuns among the jihadists. Salafi scholars from Saudi Arabia generally considered the Islamic Emirate of Kunar the only true Islamic state. Burhanuddin Rabbani attempted to convince the Saudis that the Islamic Emirate of Kunar was illegitimate, although he was ignored.

Jamil al-Rahman appointed ministers of Defense, Interior, Foreign Affairs, Justice, Information, Finance and Education. In accordance with his Salafi creed, Jamil al-Rahman tried to eradicate Afghan traditions which he considered un-Islamic, such as the use of flags over the graves of martyrs fallen in Jihad, and the building of monuments over the tombs of Pirs. In the spring of 1991 fighting resumed between Jamaat al Dawa al Quran and Hezb-e Islami Gulbuddin, which lost most of its bases in Kunar. This prompted Gulbuddin Hekmatyar to launch a counterattack with several hundred men, with the support of other mujahideen factions.

On April 20, 1991, an explosion on Jamil al-Rahman's Asadabad headquarters, apparently the result of a Scud missile strike, killed many of Jamil al-Rahman's followers and he was overthrown by Hekmatyar. Local witnesses reported that the Salafists were massacred by Hekmatyar's men. Jamil al-Rahman was forced to flee to Pakistan.

== See also ==
- Islamic Emirate of Badakhshan
- Islamic Emirate of Afghanistan (1996–2001)
- Islamic Emirate of Kurdistan
- Islamic Wilayat of Somalia
- Islamic Emirate of Yemen
- Islamic Emirate of Rafah
- Islamic Revolutionary State of Afghanistan
- List of jihadist states

== Sources ==
- Abubakar Siddique (2014) The Pashtun Question: The Unresolved Key to the Future of Pakistan and Afghanistan, Hurst: London. ISBN 978-1-84904-499-8.
- Dorronsoro, G. (2005) Revolution Unending. Afghanistan: 1979 to the present, Hurst: London. ISBN 1-85065-703-3.
