= Emblem of Afghanistan =

National emblem of the Islamic Emirate of Afghanistan
- Armiger: Islamic Emirate of Afghanistan
- Adopted: 15 August 2021; 5 years ago
- Motto: لا إله إلا الله محمد رسول الله "There is no god but God; Muhammad is the messenger of God." (Shahada)

The national emblem of Afghanistan is a national symbol of Afghanistan's government. Since 1901 it has often been featured on the flag of Afghanistan.

The current emblem features an open Quran on a rehal at the top with a rising sun behind it. Below is a stylised Mosque containing a minbar and a mihrab. An inscription of the Shahada in Arabic is positioned directly below the mosque.

Underneath the Shahada, the emblem contains the date 1415,1,15 in the Hijri Calendar (Friday, June 24, 1994) to correspond with the Taliban's establishment. This is followed by a ribbon inscribed with the Pashto name of the state, Da Afghanistan Islami Emarat. The central image is encircled by sheaves of wheat, which rest on a cogwheel. At the very bottom, two crossed sabres serve as the emblem's foundation.

== Historical emblems ==
Emirate of Afghanistan (1901–1919)

Emirate of Afghanistan (1919–1926)

Kingdom of Afghanistan (1926–1928)

Kingdom of Afghanistan (1928–1929)

Emirate of Afghanistan (1929)

Ali Ahmad Khan alternative government in emirate of Afghanistan (1929)

Kingdom of Afghanistan (1931–1973)

Republic of Afghanistan (1973–1974)

Republic of Afghanistan (1974–1978)

Democratic Republic of Afghanistan (1978–1980)

Democratic Republic of Afghanistan (1980–1987)

Republic of Afghanistan (1987–1992)

Islamic State of Afghanistan (1992–2002)

Islamic Emirate of Afghanistan (1996–2001)

Transitional Islamic State of Afghanistan (2002–2004)

Islamic Republic of Afghanistan (2004–2021)
(compare black variant)

Islamic Emirate of Afghanistan (2021–present)

=== Year numbers ===
Different years are shown in some emblems, as shown below. (Another year can be seen in the emblem of 1974–1978.)

Hijri		CE	Event	Emblems
۱۲۹۸	1298 solar	1919–1920	independence (Third Anglo-Afghan War)	2004–2021
١٣٤٨	1348 lunar	1929–1930	coronation of Nadir Shah (Civil War 1928–1929)	1931–1973, 1992–2002, 2002–2004
١٣٥٢	1352 solar	1973–1974	establishment of the Republic of Afghanistan (1973 coup d'état)	1974–1978
١٤١٥	1415 lunar	1994–1995	rise of the Taliban (Civil War 1992–1996)	1996–2001, 2021–present

== See also ==
- Flag of Afghanistan
