= Islamic Revolutionary State of Afghanistan =

Former unrecognized state in Afghanistan

Islamic Revolutionary State of Afghanistan دولت انقلابی اسلامی افغانستان
- 1980s–1990s
- Map of Nuristan Province in Afghanistan, of which the Islamic Revolutionary State of Afghanistan controlled a small region
- Status: Unrecognized independent state
- Capital and largest city: Bashgal Valley
- Religion: Salafi Sunni Islam
- Government: Unitary Islamic state
- Head of State
  - 1980s: Mawlawi Afzal
- History
  - Established: 1980s
  - Disestablished: 1990s
- Currency: Afghan afghani (de facto)
- Today part of: Afghanistan

The Islamic Revolutionary State of Afghanistan (Dari: دولت انقلابی اسلامی افغانستان, Pashto: د افغانستان اسلامي انقلابي حکومت), also known as the Islamic Revolutionary State of Nuristan, (Dari: دولت انقلابی اسلامی نورستان, Pashto: د نورستان اسلامي انقلابي حکومت) was a small Salafist Islamic state located in the north of Bashgal Valley, Nuristan Province. It was founded by Mawlawi Afzal during the nationwide Afghan mujahideen insurgency against the Soviet-backed Democratic Republic of Afghanistan and established consulates in Saudi Arabia and Pakistan. The state was absorbed by the Islamic Emirate of Afghanistan after Mawlawi Afzal allied with the Taliban.

== See also ==
- Islamic Emirate of Badakhshan
- Islamic Emirate of Afghanistan (1996–2001)
- Islamic Emirate of Kunar
