= Flag of Afghanistan =

Islamic Emirate of Afghanistan
- Use: National flag and ensign
- Proportion: 1:2
- Adopted: 27 October 1997; 29 years ago (originally); 15 August 2021; 5 years ago (reinstatement)
- Design: The Shahada in black on a white field in the calligraphic Thuluth script
- Variant flag
- Use: National flag and ensign
- Proportion: 1:2
- Design: The Shahada in black on a white field, underneath which is "Islamic Emirate of Afghanistan" in Pashto, both written in calligraphic script

The national flag (Note: Pashto: د افغانستان بیرغ, Dari: بیرق افغانستان; lit. 'Afghan flag'.) of the Islamic Emirate of Afghanistan was adopted on 15 August 2021, with the Taliban's victory in the 2001–2021 war. It features a white field with a black Shahada, the Islamic declaration of belief, inscribed. Since the 20th century, Afghanistan has changed its national flag several times. During this period, the national flag had mostly black, red, and green colours.

In contrast, the tricolour flag of the internationally recognized Islamic Republic of Afghanistan, still in use internationally, consists of three vertical stripes in black, red and green, with the national emblem at the centre in white. This emblem is encircled by sheaves of wheat and encompasses several elements: a Shahada, a Takbir, rays of the sun, a mosque with a mihrab and minbar, two miniature Afghan flags, the year 1298 in the Solar Hijri calendar (corresponding to 1919 in the Gregorian calendar), and the name of the nation. A version of this tricolour flag, introduced by King Amanullah Khan in July 1928, similarly featured three vertical stripes and an emblem within wheat sheaves.

== Symbolism of the flag of the Islamic Emirate of Afghanistan ==
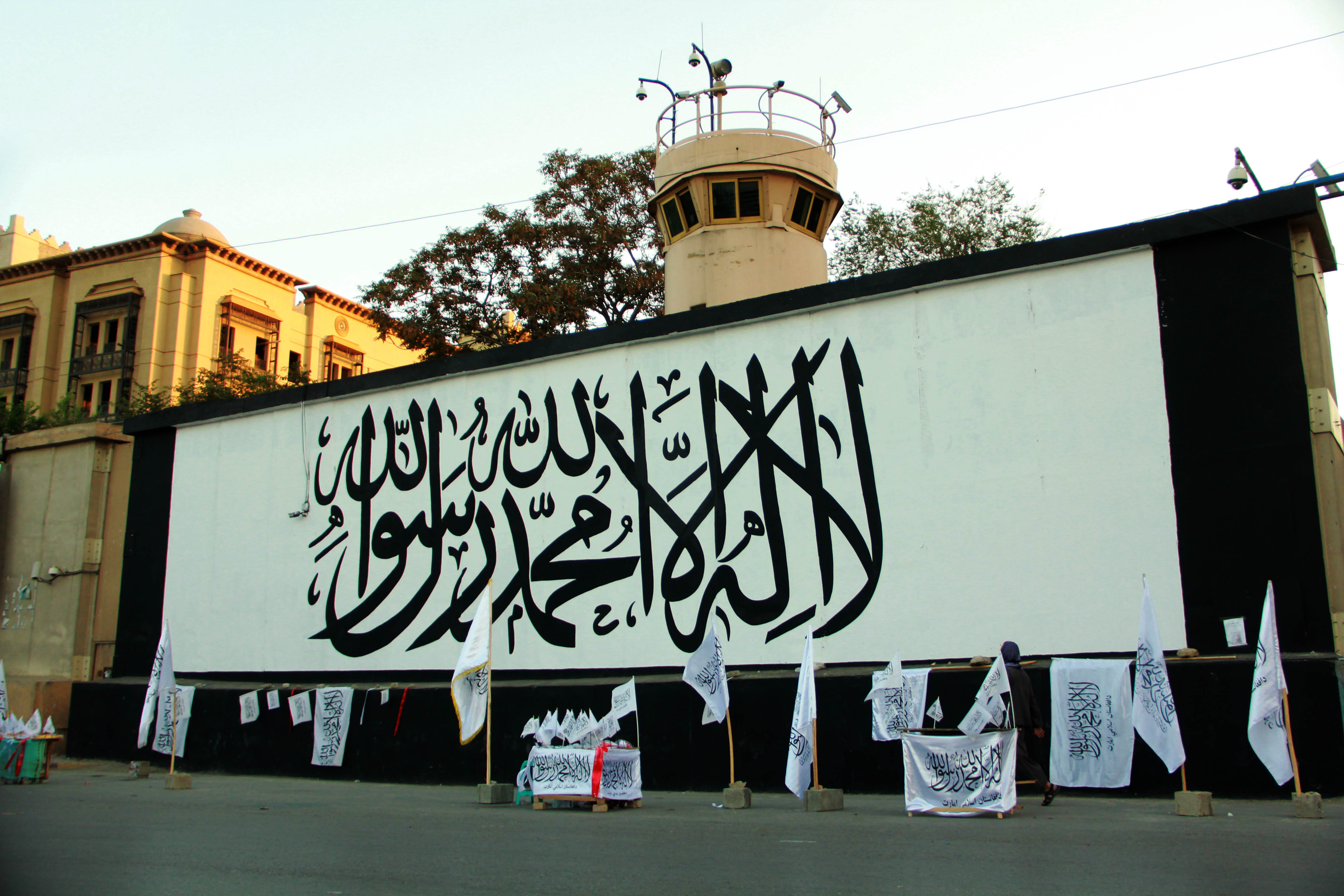
Display of the flag of the Taliban.

The current flag of the Islamic Emirate of Afghanistan is a plain white flag with the words of the shahada in black in the center. The white color stands for "the (Islamic Movement of Taliban's) purity of faith and government"; the flag incorporated the shahada, the Islamic declaration of faith, after 1997.

The current Afghan flag was likely inspired by the historic Umayyad caliphate, which began the Muslim conquest of the Indian subcontinent and Islam entered Afghanistan with the Umayyad invasion, begun in 663–665 A.D. as a prelude to the Muslim conquest of Transoxiana from 673 to 751 A.D.

== Islamic Republic tricolor ==
Islamic Republic of Afghanistan
- Use: National flag and ensign
- Proportion: 2:3
- Adopted: August 19, 2013; 13 years ago
- Design: Three vertical bands of black, red and green with the National Emblem in white centered on the red band and then slightly overlapping the black and green bands.
- Variant flag containing a colored emblem

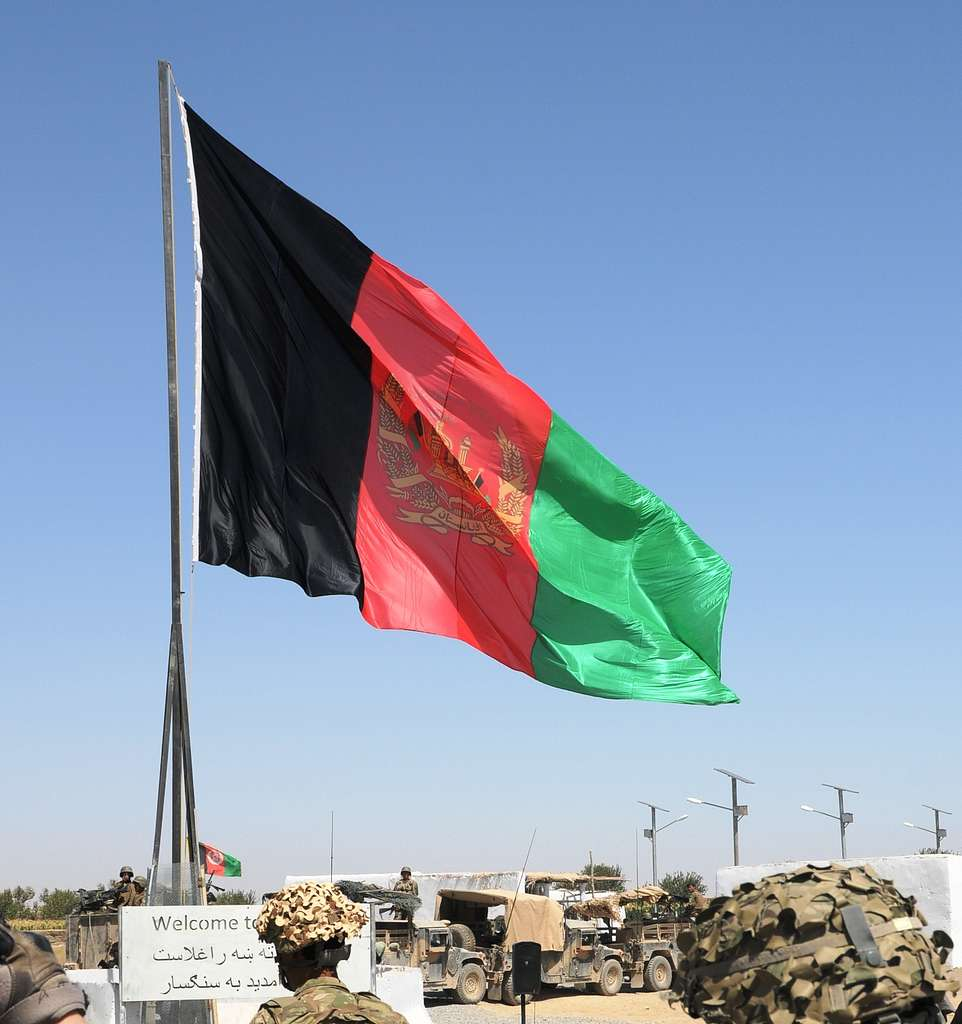
The Islamic Republic tricolor flies above a military base in 2011.

The national flag of the Islamic Republic of Afghanistan set out in the 2004 Constitution consists of a vertical tricolor with the classical national emblem in the center. The latest version was adopted on August 19, 2013, but many similar tricolor designs had been in use throughout most of the 20th century, starting in 1928.

Due to the limited diplomatic recognition of the Taliban government, this tricolor remains in use at the United Nations, by many diplomatic missions of Afghanistan, despite the overthrow of the Islamic Republic in 2021. It is still used to represent Afghanistan at the Olympic Games and other international sporting events. It is also used by the Afghan diaspora and republican insurgents, and is considered a symbol of resistance within the country.

During the Afghan Independence Day rallies in Jalalabad and other cities on 18 and 19 August 2021, the Taliban killed three people and injured over a dozen others for removing Taliban flags and displaying the tricolor Afghan flags. The Taliban has issued a decree requiring the use of the Islamic Emirate's flag in all official settings and outlawing the tricolor.

=== History of Afghanistan's tricolor flags ===
The inspiration of the Afghan tricolor in 1928

German flag, in 1919—1933

Afghan flag from 1928

The black color represents its troubled 19th century history as a protected state, the red color represents the blood of those who fought for independence (specifically, the Anglo-Afghan Treaty of 1919), and the green represents hope and prosperity for the future. Some have alternatively interpreted the black to represent history, the red to represent progress, and the green to represent either agricultural prosperity or Islam.

The tricolor was supposedly inspired by the Afghan King Amanullah Khan when visiting Europe with his wife in 1928. The original horizontal tricolor design was based on that of the Weimar Republic-era flag of Germany.

Almost every Afghan tricolor flag since 1928 has had the Emblem of Afghanistan in the center. Almost every emblem has had a mosque in it, which first appeared in 1901, and wheat, first appearing in 1928.

The last tricolor flag took its current form in 2002 with modifications later on in 2004 and 2013, with some variants containing differing coloured emblems.

Following the restoration of the Islamic Emirate of Afghanistan after the Fall of Kabul in 2021, protests took place in Jalalabad and other cities, where protesters were seen waving Afghan tricolor flags protesting its removal in defiance of Taliban rule, due to the reinstatement of the white Shahada flag and the abolishment of the former black, red and green tricolor flag.

The tricolor flag was used by the Afghan delegation at the 2020 Summer Paralympics between 25 August and 5 September 2021, as well as at the 2021 Cricket T20 World Cup between 26 October and 4 November 2021, both after the fall of Kabul.

== Historical flags ==
=== Black Standard in Central Asia ===
Black flag

Black Standard is one of the flags flown by the Islamic prophet Muhammad according to Muslim tradition. It was historically used by Abu Muslim in his uprising leading to the Abbasid Revolution in 747 and is therefore associated with the Abbasid Caliphate in particular. The revolution began with a rebellion in Khorasan. After this event, in the world of Islam, black banners were strongly associated with Khorasan and the East in general.

The next dynasty associated with the use of the Black Banner was the Hotak dynasty in the early 18th century, following Mirwais Hotak's Sunni rebellion against the Twelver Shi'i Safavid dynasty. The flags of the Hotak dynasty are remembered as solid black, but sometimes there were also white shahada inscriptions.

=== Durrani Kingdom Flag (1747–1801, 1803–1809, and 1839–1842) ===
c. 1747–1801, 1803–1809, and 1839–1842

=== Herat flag (1818–1842) ===
c. 1818–1842

The Hotak dynasty was overthrown by Persian King, Nader Shah. Following his assassination in 1747, Ahmad Shah Durrani rose to power in Kandahar. He rapidly expanded into neighboring countries such as the Mughal Empire, Afsharids, and others. Ahmad Shah became the first Amir of modern Afghanistan (ruled 1747–1772). After the Durranis were deposed from power and forced to exile in Herat after the assassination of Fateh Khan Barakzai, the flag was implemented during the reign of Kamran Shah Durrani in the Emirate of Herat.

=== Principality of Kandahar (1818–1856) ===
c. 1818–1856

Used by the Principality of Kandahar from 1818 to 1856.

=== Emirate of Kabul (1823–1839) ===
c. 1823–1839

First flag of the Emirate of Kabul which would later become the Emirate of Afghanistan.

=== Second flag (1843–1879) ===
c. 1843–1880

=== Third flag (1880–1892) ===
c. 1843–1879

=== Fourth flag (1892–1897) ===
c. 1892–1897

Used during the reign of Emir Abdur Rahman Khan.

=== Fourth flag (1901–1919) ===
1897–1919

State flag and royal banner introduced in 1897. Its use was limited to the king, the army and some state services (e.g. customs). Overlaid on a black field was a white emblem with a schematic drawing of a mosque, inside of which could be seen the mihrâb, a niche for prayer facing Mecca, and the minbar (pulpit). The mosque rested on crossed arms and weather vanes and was crowned with a royal headdress (Kolah namadi), all encased in a garland of leaves.

=== Fifth flag (1919–1921/29) ===
1919–1921/29

First flag flown under the rule of Emir Amanullah. He expanded his father and grandfather's flag by removing the cannons and replacing the wreath with rays emanating from the seal in the form of an octagram. This new style of seal was common in the Ottoman Empire.

=== Sixth flag (1921–1926/29) ===
1921–1926/29

An oval replaced the circle inscribing the mosque in 1921. In 1926, Amanullah was proclaimed King and changed the national flag by modernizing the arms.

=== Seventh flag (1926–1928) ===
1926–1928
Royal flag of Amanullah Khan (pre 1926–1929)

Royal flag of Amanullah Khan (reverse)

After being crowned the first king of Afghanistan, Amanullah Khan replaced the star with a wreath, which, depending on the version, consisted of olive and oak leaves. The swords and kolah were removed from the emblem, and the mosque was redrawn to be more complex. Despite these changes, during Amanullah Khan's trip to Europe in 1928, he was greeted with flags with the star. In addition to changing the national flag, the king also introduced a personal flag, which contained elements removed from the emblem on a red background on the obverse and royal tughra on the reverse.

=== Eighth flag (1928) ===
1928

Next flag flown under King Amanullah, introduced around June 1928. The Black Banner was replaced by the tricolor for the first time. Consisting of black, red and green respectively, symbolizing the past (previous flags), bloodshed for independence (Third Anglo-Afghan War) and hope for the future, it was probably influenced by the king's visit to Europe, and especially the Weimar Republic (which at the time had a black-red-gold flag) in 1927/8.

=== Ninth flag (1928–1929) ===
1928–1929 (possible variant)

1928–1929 (possible variant)

1928–1929 (possible variant)

Fifth flag flown under the rule of Amanullah, introduced about a month after the last change. It was the first vertical-tricolored flag which would be used throughout most of the remainder of the 20th century. The emblem was completely changed in the style of socialist heraldry, removing religious, military and royal references. The new emblem shows the sun rising over two snow-capped mountains, representing a new beginning for the kingdom. This emblem also contained heaps of wheat, an icon that would be present on all future emblems of Afghanistan throughout different regimes. Notably, only the Soviet emblem had wheat at the time, and would in the future appear on many communist states' flags. The flag is known only through abbreviated descriptions; the chromatics of the central emblem are uncertain, as is the presence of the star. This short-lived innovative emblem did not appear on the currency. The symbol of the sun rising over the mountains appears later in the 1940s on the flag of Pashtunistan.

=== Tenth flag (1929) ===
1929

In January 1929, in opposition to Amrullah's reformist rule, the Saqqawists approached Kabul. The king abdicated, leaving power to his brother. During the 3 days of his reign, Inayatullah Khan reportedly hoisted old flags with a solid black background.

=== Eleventh flag (1929) ===
1929

Flag used for several months in 1929 in areas not under Saqqawist control. During Amanullah's struggle to regain power the tricolor flag was restored however, in the center was the old radial emblem – with some modifications – in an elliptical version.

=== Twelfth flag (1929–1931) ===
1929

Herat flag 1929–1931

Saqqawist forces under Habibullāh Kalakāni established government of Emirate of Afghanistan on 17 January 1929. Flag flown under the brief rule of Habibullah Kalakani – a red, black and white vertical tricolor, like the ones used by the Mongols during their occupation of Afghanistan in the 13th century. Saqqawist Emirate of Afghanistan controlled only part of Afghanistan, mainly around Kabul and a wide north–south strip along the border with British India, present-day Pakistan. The exception was the city of Herat, which was conquered in an uprising and held long after the fall of the Emirate and Kalakani's death. The insurgents in Herat used a modified Saqqawi flag with a crescent moon.

=== Thirteenth flag (1929) ===
1929

Transitional flag used by Ali Ahmad Khan's short-lived rival government in Jalalabad, in opposition to the Kalakani rebellion.

=== Fourteenth flag (1929–1931) ===
1929 – 27 March 1931

Direct development of the ninth flag under Mohammad Nadir Shah which retained the emblem in the star.

=== Fifteenth flag (1931–1973) ===
27 March 1931 – 16 July 1973
Royal standard of the King of Afghanistan (1931–1973)

Reverse of Mohammad Nadir Shah's royal standard (1931–1933)

Reverse of Mohammad Zahir Shah's royal standard (1933–1973)

A modified variant of the fifth flag's wheat emblem replaced the octagram. The year ١٣٤٨ (1348 of the lunar Islamic calendar, or 1929 AD of the Gregorian calendar; the year Mohammed Nadir Shah's dynasty began) in Persian numerals and a ribbon bearing the inscription افغانستان were added below the depiction of the mosque. New royal flags were also introduced based on the 1926 design, which included the national emblem on a red background and a royal tughra on the reverse. This flag has the longest use of any in modern Afghanistan, being used until the 1973 Afghan coup d'état which overthrew King Mohammad Zahir Shah. It was officially confirmed in the constitution of October 1964.

=== Sixteenth flag (1973–1974) ===
17 July 1973 – 8 May 1974

First flag flown for the Republic of Afghanistan, proclaimed after the 1973 Afghan coup d'état by the king's cousin, Army General Mohammad Daoud Khan, who became the first president. It is identical to the previous flag, except that the year ١٣٤٨ (1348) was removed due to the abolition of the monarchy; this was likely not followed because of the poverty of the country, the low level of public construction and the family links between Daoud and deposed King Zahir Shah.

=== Seventeenth flag (1974–1978) ===
9 May 1974 – 26 April 1978

Vertical variant
Standard of the president of Afghanistan (1974–1978)

Second flag flown for the Republic of Afghanistan. The same colors were used, but the meanings reinterpreted: black for the obscure past, red for blood shed for independence, and green for prosperity from agriculture. In the canton is a new seal, with a golden eagle with spread wings, a pulpit (minbar) on the eagle's chest (for a mosque), wheat surrounding the eagle, and the sun's rays above the eagle (for the new republic). The cartouche bears the name of the country and the date of the revolution according to the local solar calendar, 26 changash 1352, or 17 July 1973. President Daoud also changed the flag of the head of state by replacing it with a new emblem, and the flag became double-sided.

=== Eighteenth flag (1978) ===
27 April 1978 – 18 October 1978

When the republic's president Mohammad Daoud Khan was killed in a coup, the new regime under the People's Democratic Party of Afghanistan (PDPA) established a communist state. For a brief period of time, during the transition, the same flag design was kept, but no seal. A similar flag was used by the Junbish-e Milli party which controlled autonomous northern Afghanistan from 1992 to 1998.

=== Nineteenth flag (1978–1980) ===
19 October 1978 – 21 April 1980

A radical change, this flag used a red field with a yellow seal in the canton, a common design for socialist states in the 20th century. In fact, the design was very similar to the flag of the neighboring Soviet Union. It consisted of the PDPA's Khalq (Pashto: خلق, lit. 'masses' or 'people') faction's emblem with wheat, a star at the top (representing the five ethnic groups of the nation), the term 'Khalq' in Nastaliq script in the center, and a subtitle reading 'Saur Revolution ١٣٥٧' (1357 SH in the Persian calendar and 1978 in Gregorian calendar) and the full name of the state. All religious references are gone.

=== Twentieth flag (1980–1987) ===
22 April 1980 – 29 November 1987

Under the Fundamental Principles program of the new leadership under Babrak Karmal, the traditional black, red and green tricolor was re-established, representing the past, blood shed for independence, and the Islamic faith, respectively. A new seal was designed, with a rising sun (a reference to the former name, Khorasan, meaning "Land of the Rising Sun"), a pulpit and a book, ribbons with the national colors, a cogwheel for industry, and a red star for communism. The seal's ribbons and wheat has similarities to the then-East German and Romanian seals.

=== Twenty-first flag (1987–1992) ===
30 November 1987 – 26 April 1992

30 November 1987 – 26 April 1992

The flag was changed as part of Mohammad Najibullah's National Reconciliation constitution changes. Same as the previous flag, except that in the national seal, the cogwheel is moved from the top to the bottom, the red star and the book are removed, and the green field curved to resemble the horizon.

=== Twenty-second flag (1992) ===
27 April 1992 − 6 December 1992

27 April 1992 − 6 December 1992

This flag was used as a provisional flag after the fall of the Najibullah pro-Soviet regime. It appeared in many variants of which two are shown here. The upper stripe contains the Takbir, whereas the center stripe (now white, with the red entirely removed from the flag) contains the Shahada.

=== Twenty-third flag (1992–2002) ===
7 December 1992 – 27 September 1996; 27 September 1996 – 27 January 2002 (Northern Alliance)

Alternate orientation

The new Islamic government under Rabbani featured a flag change. The color scheme is similar to several Middle Eastern Muslim nations' flags. Elements from the times of the monarchy returned to the emblem, but with the addition of the Shahada and drawn completely differently swords representing the mujahideen's victory. It now shows the year ١۲۹٨ (1298), the solar Islamic calendar equivalent of AD 1919 of the Gregorian Calendar, the year of full independence. On the bottom part of the emblem was written "دا افغانستان اسلامی دولت", Islamic State of Afghanistan. The rays of the rising sun have survived on the emblem. This pattern was used longer in areas that the Taliban did not control after winning the Battle for Kabul, i.e. the north of the country. In 2021, the flag returned among the flags of the National Resistance Front of Afghanistan.

=== Twenty-fourth flag (1996–1997) ===
27 September 1996 – 26 October 1997

A plain white banner was used by the Taliban. In the Islamic tradition, the white banner is attributed to the Umayyad dynasty, which was overthrown by the Abbasids associated with black banners.

During this period, the Afghan flag was one of only two national flags in the world to have one colour and no design, the other being the all-green national flag of Libya.

=== Twenty-fifth flag (1997–2001) ===
26 October 1997 – 13 November 2001

In 1997, the Taliban introduced the Arabic Shahada in black on a white flag as the national flag of the Islamic Emirate of Afghanistan.

=== Twenty-sixth flag (2001–2002) ===
13 November 2001 – 27 January 2002

This flag was used by President Rabbani along with the national flag after the fall of the Taliban government. Same as the 1992 flag, but with a blue Shahada.

=== Twenty-seventh flag (2002) ===
28 January 2002 – 27 June 2002

After the fall of the Taliban, the traditional black, red and green colors were restored and in a vertical pattern, just as the ones flown from 1928 to 1974. The center emblem is the classical emblem of Afghanistan – it is a similar version as used in the 1992 flag, but with the swords removed.

=== Twenty-eighth flag (2002–2004) ===
27 June 2002 – 9 October 2004

The Loya Jirga of spring 2002 voted the Afghan national flag with some changes including the coat of arms being gold instead of white, the year now dating "1380" under the mosque instead of "1348". In June 2002, Afghanistan officially changed its national flag from a white coat of arms in the center of the flag to a gold coat of arms which symbolizes the colour of a wheat wreath.

=== Twenty-ninth flag (2004–2021) ===
August 19, 2013 – 15 August 2021 (Note: Remains in use in some contexts, mostly outside Afghanistan. See § Islamic Republic tricolor.)

9 October 2004 – 15 August 2021

9 October 2004 – 19 August 2013
Standard of the president of Afghanistan (2004–2013)

Standard of the president of Afghanistan (2013–2021)

The 2004 constitution adopted under Hamid Karzai's presidency adopts an emblem more akin to the last emblem from the reign of the kingdom. The flag was used in many variants by the Islamic State of Afghanistan, and after its collapse is one of the flags of the anti-Taliban opposition. In 2004, the flag of the head of state was introduced again, this time in opposite colors than the flag from the time of Daud. However, a newer emblem appeared only in 2013, when Karzai was replaced by Ashraf Ghani.

=== Thirtieth flag (2021–present) ===
15 August 2021 – present

15 August 2021 – present

15 August 2021 – present (with Pashto subtext)

In 2021, the Taliban re-introduced the flag of the Islamic Emirate. As with the first adoption of the Taliban flag, many variants appeared this time, among others, Shahada on a white flag with "Islamic Emirate of Afghanistan" in Pashto written below the Arabic Shahada; a Dari Persian version of the flag has also been observed in the northern regions of Afghanistan.

== Unicode ==
The flag of Afghanistan is represented as the Unicode emoji sequence U+1F1E6 🇦 REGIONAL INDICATOR SYMBOL LETTER A and U+1F1EB 🇫 REGIONAL INDICATOR SYMBOL LETTER F, making "🇦🇫". Emoji platforms continue to represent it with the § Islamic Republic tricolor.

== See also ==
- List of Afghan flags
- Afghan rebel flags
- Emblem of Afghanistan
- Flags of Asia
