= Islamic Emirate of Badakhshan =

Former unrecognized state in Afghanistan

Islamic Emirate of Badakhshan امارت اسلامی بدخشان
- 1996
- Flag

- Map of Badakhshan Province in Afghanistan, of which the Islamic Emirate of Badakhshan controlled a small region
- Status: Unrecognized independent state
- Capital and largest city: Badakhshan, Afghanistan
- Religion: Salafi Sunni Islam
- Demonym: Badakhshani
- Government: Unitary Islamic emirate
- Emir
  - 1996: Mawlawi Shariqi
- History
  - Established: 1996
  - Disestablished: 1996
- Currency: Afghan afghani (de facto)
- Today part of: Afghanistan

The Islamic Emirate of Badakhshan was an unrecognized Islamic state ruled by Sharia law in modern day Badakhshan Province, Afghanistan.

== History ==
The area was controlled by forces loyal to the Tajik leaders Burhanuddin Rabbani and Ahmad Shah Massoud during the 1990's, who were the de facto national government until 1996. Badakhshan was the only province which did not fall under Taliban control from 1996 to 2001. During the ongoing Afghan Civil War, an ethnic Tajik, Mawlawi Shariqi, established a non-Taliban Islamic Emirate by the Islamic Revolutionary State of Afghanistan in neighboring Nuristan. The Islamic Emirate of Badakhshan was a Salafi Tajik state which was ruled by Sharia. It was established around the same time that the Islamic Emirate of Kunar and the IRSA were established, although "none of these states were able to grow by incorporating other areas and all three collapsed quickly".

Mawlawi Shariqi was assassinated and the Islamic Emirate of Badakhshan was captured in 1996 by Northern Alliance forces led by Ahmad Shah Massoud.

== See also ==
- Emirate of Badakhshan
- Islamic Emirate of Kunar
- Islamic Revolutionary State of Afghanistan
- List of jihadist states
