= Islamic state =

Government based on Islamic law

An Islamic state has a form of government based on sharia. As a term, it has been used to describe various historical polities and theories of governance in the Islamic world. As a translation of the Arabic term dawlah islāmiyyah (Arabic: دولة إسلامية) it refers to a modern notion associated with political Islam (Islamism). Notable historical examples include the first Islamic state in Medina, established by the prophet Muhammad, and the Arab caliphates which continued under his successors, such as the Rashidun and Umayyads.

The concept of the modern Islamic state has been articulated and promoted by ideologues such as Rashid Rida, Mullah Omar, Abul A'la Maududi, Ruhollah Khomeini, Israr Ahmed, Sayyid Qutb, Taqi al-Din al-Nabhani and Hassan al-Banna. Implementation of Islamic law plays an important role in modern theories of the Islamic state, as it did in classical Islamic political theories. However, most of the modern theories also make use of notions that did not exist before the modern era.

Today, many Islamic countries have incorporated Islamic law, wholly or in part, into their legal systems. Certain Muslim states have declared Islam to be their state religion in their constitutions, but do not apply Islamic law in their courts. Islamic states that are not Islamic monarchies are mostly Islamic republics.

== Historical Islamic states ==
Majid Khadduri gives six stages of history for the Islamic state:

1. City-state (622–632)
2. Imperial (632–c. 750)
3. Universal (c. 750–c. 900)
4. Decentralization (c. 900–c. 1500)
5. Fragmentation (c. 1500–1918)
6. Nation states (1918–present)

=== Early Islamic governments ===
The first Islamic state was the political entity established by Muhammad in Medina in 622 CE under the Constitution of Medina. It represented the political unity of the Muslim Ummah (nation). It was subsequently transformed into the caliphate by Muhammad's disciples, who were known as the Rightly Guided (Rashidun) Caliphs (632–661 CE). The Islamic State significantly expanded under the Umayyad Caliphate (661–750) and consequently the Abbasid Caliphate (750–1258).

=== Essence of Islamic governments ===
The essence or guiding principles of an Islamic government or Islamic state is the concept of al-Shura. Several scholars have different understandings or thoughts with regard to the concept al-Shura. However, some Muslim scholars are of the opinion that Islamic al-Shura should consist of the following:

- Meeting or consultation that follows the teachings of Islam.
- Consultation following the guidelines of the Quran and the Sunnah.
- There is a leader elected among them to head the meeting.
- The discussion should be based on mushawarah and mudhakarah.
- All members are given fair opportunity to voice out their opinions.
- The issue should be of maslahah ammah or public interest.
- The voices of the majority are accepted, provided it does not violate the teachings of the Quran or Sunnah.

Muhammad himself respected the decision of the shura members. He is the champion of the notion of al-Shura, and this was illustrated in one of the many historical events, such as in the Battle of Khandaq (Battle of the Trench), where Muhammad was faced with two decisions, i.e. to fight the invading non-Muslim Arab armies outside of Medina or wait until they enter the city. After consultation with the sahabah (companions), it was suggested by Salman al-Farsi that it would be better if the Muslims fought the non-Muslim Arabs within Medina by building a big ditch on the northern periphery of Medina to prevent the enemies from entering Medina. This idea was later supported by the majority of the sahabah, and thereafter Muhammad also approved it.

Muhammad placed great emphasis on agreement about the decision of the shura because the majority opinion (by the sahabah) is better than a decision made by one individual.

=== Revival and abolition of the Ottoman Caliphate ===
The Ottoman Sultan, Selim I (1512–1520) reclaimed the title of caliph which had been in dispute and asserted by a diversity of rulers and shadow caliphs in the centuries of the Abbasid-Mamluk Caliphate since the Mongols' sacking of Baghdad and the killing of the last Abbasid Caliph in Baghdad, Iraq 1258.

The Ottoman Caliphate as an office of the Ottoman Empire was abolished under Mustafa Kemal Atatürk in 1924 as part of Atatürk's Reforms. This move was most vigorously protested in India, as Mahatma Gandhi and Indian Muslims united behind the symbolism of the Ottoman Caliph in the Khilafat Movement which sought to reinstate the caliph deposed by Atatürk. The movement leveraged the Ottoman resistance against political pressure from Britain to abolish the caliphate, connecting it with Indian nationalism and the movement for independence from British rule. However, the Khilafat found little support from the Muslims of the Middle East themselves who preferred to be independent nation states rather than being under the Ottoman Turkish rule. In the Indian sub-continent, although Gandhi tried to co-opt the Khilafat as a national movement, it soon degenerated into a jihad against non-Muslims, also known as Moplah riots, with thousands being killed in the Malabar region of Kerala.

== Modern Islamic state ==
=== Development of the notion of dawla ===
The Arabic word dawla comes from the root d-w-l, meaning "to turn, come around in a cyclical fashion". In the Quran, it is used to refer to the nature of human fortunes, alternating between victory and defeat (3:140). This use led Arab writers to apply the word to succession of dynasties, particularly to the overthrow of the Umayyads of Damascus by the Abbasids. The first Abbasid caliphs themselves spoke of "our dawla" in the sense of "our turn/time of success". As Abbasids maintained their power, the dynastic sense of dawla became conflated with their dynastic rule, and in later times al-Dawla was used across the Islamic world as a honorific title for rulers and high officials.

Like their Christian contemporaries, pre-modern Muslims did not generally conceive of the state as an abstract entity distinct from the individual or group who held political power. The word dawla and its derivatives began to acquire modern connotations in the Ottoman Empire and Iran in the 16th and 17th centuries in the course of diplomatic and commercial exchanges with Europe. During the 19th century, the Arabic dawla and Turkish devlet took on all the aspects of the modern notion of state, while the Persian davlat can mean either state or government.

=== Development of the Modern Conception of an Islamic State ===
According to Pakistani scholar of Islamic history Qamaruddin Khan, the term Islamic state "was never used in the theory or practice of Muslim political science, before the twentieth century". Sohail H. Hashmi characterizes dawla Islamiyya as a neologism found in contemporary Islamist writings. Islamic theories of the modern notion of state first emerged as a reaction to the abolition of the Ottoman caliphate in 1924. It was also in this context that the famous dictum that Islam is both a religion and a state (al-Islam din wa dawla) was first popularized.

The modern conception of an Islamic state was first articulated by the Syrian-Egyptian Islamic theologian Muḥammad Rashīd Riḍā (1865–1935). Rashid Rida condemned the 1922 abolition of the Ottoman sultanate, which reduced the khilafa into a purely spiritual authority soon after World War I. In his book al-Khilafa aw al-Imama al-Uzma (The Caliphate or the Supreme Imamate), published in 1922, Rida asserted that the caliphate should have the combined powers of both spiritual and temporal authority. He called for the establishment of an Islamic state led by Arabs, functioning as a khilāfat ḍurūrah (caliphate of necessity) that upholds Sharia and defends its Muslim and non-Muslim subjects.

Another important modern conceptualization of the Islamic state is attributed to Abul A'la Maududi (1903–1979), a Pakistani Muslim theologian who founded the political party Jamaat-e-Islami Pakistan and inspired other Islamic revolutionaries such as Ayatollah Ruhollah Khomeini. Abul A'la Maududi's early political career was significantly influenced by anti-colonial agitation in India, especially after the tumultuous abolition of the Ottoman Caliphate in 1924 stoked anti-British sentiment.

The Islamic state was perceived as a third way between the rival political systems of democracy and socialism, which was also noted by Islamic modernism. Maududi's seminal writings on Islamic economics argued as early as 1941 against free-market capitalism and state intervention in the economy, similar to Mohammad Baqir al-Sadr's 1961 Our Economics. Maududi envisioned the ideal Islamic state as combining the democratic principles of electoral politics with the socialist principles of concern for people with low incomes.

== Muslim world today ==

Today, many Muslim countries have incorporated—albeit to varying degrees—Islamic law into their legal systems. Certain Muslim states have declared Islam to be their state religion in their constitutions, but do not apply Islamic law in their courts. Islamic states that are not monarchies are usually called Islamic republics, such as the Islamic republics of Iran, Pakistan, and Mauritania. Pakistan adopted the title under the constitution of 1956; Mauritania adopted it on 28 November 1958; and Iran adopted it after the 1979 Revolution that overthrew the Pahlavi dynasty. The Iranian form of government is known as a Guardianship of the Islamic Jurists. Afghanistan was run as an Islamic state (Islamic State of Afghanistan) in the post-communist era after 1992; it was a de facto Islamic totalitarian state under the Taliban (Islamic Emirate of Afghanistan) in areas controlled by the group from 1996 to its 2001 overthrow. The country was known as the Islamic Republic of Afghanistan between 2004 and 15 August 2021, when a Taliban offensive resulted in a return to Islamic totalitarianism.

Pan-Islamism is a form of Internationalism and anti-nationalism within political Islam which advocates the unification of the Muslim world under a single Islamic state, often described as a caliphate or ummah. The most famous, powerful and aggressive modern pan-Islamic group that pursues the objective of unifying the Muslim world and establishing a worldwide caliphate is the Wahhabi/Salafi jihadist movement Islamic State of Iraq and the Levant.

The Libyan interim Constitutional Declaration as of 3 August 2011 declared Islam to be the official religion of Libya.

=== Brunei ===
Brunei is an absolute Islamic monarchy. With the constitution in 1959, Islam became the official religion of the country.

=== Iran ===
Leading up to the Iranian Revolution of 1979, many of the highest-ranking clergy in Shia Islam held to the standard doctrine of the Imamate, which allows political rule only by Muhammad or one of his true successors. They were opposed to creating an Islamic state (see Ayatollah Ha'eri Yazdi (Khomeini's own teacher), Ayatollah Borujerdi, Grand Ayatollah Shariatmadari, and Grand Ayatollah Abu al-Qasim al-Khoei). Contemporary theologians who were once part of the Iranian Revolution also became disenchanted and critical of the unity of religion and state in the Islamic Republic of Iran, are advocating secularization of the state to preserve the purity of the Islamic faith (see Abdolkarim Soroush and Mohsen Kadivar).

Per Supreme leader, Islamic state is the 3rd phase of Iranian Islamic Republic program and is in and of itself part of New Islamic Civilization.

=== Saudi Arabia ===
Saudi Arabia is an Islamic absolute monarchy. The Basic Law of Saudi Arabia contains many characteristics of what might be called a constitution in other countries. However, the Qur'an and the Sunnah is declared to be the official constitution of the country which is governed on the basis of Islamic law (Shari'a). The Allegiance Council is responsible to determine the new King and the new Crown Prince. All citizens of full age have a right to attend, meet, and petition the king directly through the traditional tribal meeting known as the majlis.

=== Yemen ===
The Constitution of Yemen declares that Islam is the state religion, and that Shari'a (Islamic law) is the source of all legislation.

=== Mauritania ===
The Islamic Republic of Mauritania is a country in the Maghreb region of western North Africa. Mauritania was declared an independent state as the Islamic Republic of Mauritania, on November 28, 1960. The Constitutional Charter of 1985 declares Islam as the state religion and sharia the law of the land.

=== Libya ===
As of today, Libya observes Sharia law within its criminal justice system,decriminalizing some Gaddafi-era crimes. These include theft and robbery (Law /1972), adultery (Law 1973/70), unfounded accusations of fornication (Law 1974/52), and the consumption of alcoholic beverages (Law 1974).

=== Pakistan ===
Pakistan was created as a separate state for Indian Muslims in British India in 1947, and followed the parliamentary form of democracy. In 1949, the first Constituent Assembly of Pakistan passed the Objectives Resolution which envisaged an official role for Islam as the state religion to make sure any future law should not violate its basic teachings. On the whole, the state retained most of the laws that were inherited from the British legal code that had been enforced by the British Raj since the 19th century. In 1956, the elected parliament formally adopted the name Islamic Republic of Pakistan, declaring Islam as the official religion.

=== Afghanistan ===
After the fall of Democratic Republic of Afghanistan (Soviet occupation), Afghanistan has gone through several attempts to set up an Islamic state:

- Islamic State of Afghanistan (1992–2002)
- Islamic Emirate of Afghanistan (1996–2001)
- Transitional Islamic State of Afghanistan (2002–2004)
- Islamic Republic of Afghanistan (2004–2021)
- Islamic Emirate of Afghanistan (2021–present)

=== Syria ===
Syria was previously ruled by its Ba'athist regime from 1963 until 2024, when the regime collapsed. Following the fall of the Assad regime, the Islamist Hay'at Tahrir al-Sham (HTS) established a transitional government in 2025, which is expected to govern for five years under a temporary constitution. Under the constitution, the religion of the President of Syria is Islam, and Islamic jurisprudence is the principal source of legislation. In his first interview as president, on 9 February 2025, Syrian President Ahmed al-Sharaa told The Economist that, in response to a question about whether Sharia could be implemented, "that decision rests with the experts. If they approve it, my duty is to enforce it; if they reject it, my duty is to uphold their decision as well."

== See also ==
- Syed Farid al-Attas
- Central Waqf Council
- Christian state
- Former Salafist states in Afghanistan
- Guardianship of the Islamic Jurist
- Halachic state – Jewish state governed by rabbinical law (halakha)
- Hizb ut-Tahrir
- Islamic Emirate of Afghanistan
- Islamic Revolutionary State of Afghanistan
- Islamic State
- Islamic State of Azawad – a former short-lived unrecognised state declared unilaterally in 2012 by the National Movement for the Liberation of Azawad
- Islamic State of Indonesia – (Negara Islam Indonesia or Darul Islam), Islamist group in Indonesia that aims for the establishment of an Islamic state of Indonesia (an unrecognised state)
- Theocracy § Islamic theocracies
