= Jamaat al-Dawah ila al-Quran wal-Sunnah =

Islamist militant organisation

- جماعة الدعوة الى القرآن والسنة
- Other name: "The Salafi Group" "Salafi Taliban"
- Founder: Jamil al-Rahman
- Dates active: c. 1986 – 2010
- Allegiance: Islamic Emirate of Kunar (1991); Islamic Emirate of Afghanistan (since 2010)
- Active regions: Kunar, Afghanistan
- Ideology: Salafi Jihadism
- Part of: Taliban (since 2010)
- Wars: the War in Afghanistan (1978–present) and the Global War on Terrorism

Jamaat al-Dawah ila al-Quran wal-Sunnah (Arabic: جماعة الدعوة إلى القرآن والسنة, lit. 'Group for the proselytization (Dawah) to the Quran and the ways of the prophet (Sunnah)'), abbreviated as JDQS, also known as The Salafi Group, was a militant Islamist organisation operating in eastern Afghanistan.

== Background ==
Founded around 1986 during the Soviet–Afghan War by Jamil al-Rahman as a splinter from the larger Hezbi Islami faction, Jamaat al Dawa al Quran was a Salafi organisation that hosted many Arab volunteers and received funding from sympathetic Saudi and Kuwaiti businessmen. The group was able to establish the Islamic Emirate of Kunar, an Islamist mini-state in Kunar Province in 1991, but it quickly dissolved after attacks by Hezbi Islami and al-Rahman's assassination in 1991, however JDQ continued to operate.

Following the 2001 US-led invasion of Afghanistan, one faction of JDQ registered as a political party and took part in the 2005 Afghan parliamentary elections. Alleged arbitrary arrests and cultural insensitivity by coalition forces, along with loss of influence in the local Kunar administration, led to JDQ members joining the local insurgency as the Salafi Taliban.

By the later part of the decade, JDQ began taking part in the insurgency against NATO and Afghan security forces in Korangal Valley. In 2010, the group pledged allegiance to Mullah Omar, leader of the Taliban. Taliban spokesman Zabiullah Mujahid released a statement announcing that JDQ was now a part of the Taliban. The group no longer exists as JDQ but merged completely into the Afghan Taliban.

JDQ was involved in the September 2010 kidnapping of British aid worker Linda Norgrove, who was accidentally killed by US forces during a rescue attempt.

== Designation as a terrorist organization ==
Countries and organizations below have officially listed the group as a terrorist organization.

Country	Date	References
United States	25 May 2016	

== Combatant Status Review Tribunal ==
Having an affiliation with the organisation was raised by the Combatant Status Review Tribunal during the hearings of several detainees at Guantanamo Bay detention camp.

isn	names	notes
561	Abdul Rahim Muslimdost	Three of the allegations Muslimdost faced during his Tribunal were: The detainee was a member of Jamaat ud Dawa il al Quran al Sunnat [sic] (JDQ).; Jamyat-u-Dawa-al-Quarani [sic] (JDQ) conducted training with several types of weapons in the Abdullah Abu Masood camp.; The JDQ is a militant religious school which trains students in military camps as well as classrooms. The JDQ has a militant wing and an assassination wing.; Muslimdost acknowledged being a member of the JDQ—fifteen years earlier, during the struggle to oust Afghanistan's Soviet invaders.; Muslimdost said the JDQ had a military wing, and practiced assassination.; Muslimdost said the JDQ had run training camps, and had tried to assassinate him.
798	Sahib Rohullah Wakil	Two of the allegations Rohullah faced during his Tribunal were: The detainee is an Afghanistan citizen who is a high-ranking member of Jama' AT UL Dawa AL Qurani [sic] (JDQ).; Jama' AT UL Dawa AL Qurani [sic] (JDQ) is an Islamic extremist group operating in Pakistan, which received funds from non-governmental organisations located throughout the Middle East.; Rohullah testified that the JDQ was not an extremist group, and had not had a military wing since 1991.; Rohullah testified that all the JDQ's operations since the ouster of the communists have been humanitarian.; Rohullah testified that the JDQ had been supported by the Northern Alliance.
	Sabar Lal Melma	Three of the allegations Sabar Lal Melma faced during his Administrative Review Board hearing were: The detainee is a member of Jamiat-e-Dawa-el-al-Qurani Wasouna [sic] (JDQ).; The detainee has met with Haji Rohullah, leader of Jamiat-e-Dawa-el-al Qurani Wasouna [sic], and Loya Jirga, representative for the Konar region, on numerous occasions.; Jamiat-ul-Dawa-ul-Qurani [sic], an Islamic extremist group with ties to the Pakistani Inter-Service Intelligence Directorate, consisted of Afghan refugees from camps in the Peshawar area. This organisation supported the continued war in Kashmir.

== Training Camp ==
Counter-terrorism analysts, and the United Nations, assert that the Jamaat al Dawa al Quran maintained JDQ training camps, or built its bases on former Lashkar-e-Taiba training camps. According to American counter-terrorism analysts, some Guantanamo captives' continued detention was justified by staying at, or other association with, a JDQ training camp.

Allegations used to justify the continued detention of Amir Yakoub Mohammed Al Amir Mahmoud stated he attended, and lived near, a JDQ training camp. The training camp he was alleged to have attended was outside of Assad-Abad, where he trained on "AK-47s, M16s, RPGs, 82-mm mortar and an old piece of Soviet artillery." He was alleged to have lived at the camp for a year, following the Soviets' defeat during the Soviet occupation of Afghanistan, where he "worked with Abu Ekhlas Al-Masri."
