= Kolah namadi =

Traditional Iranian head covering

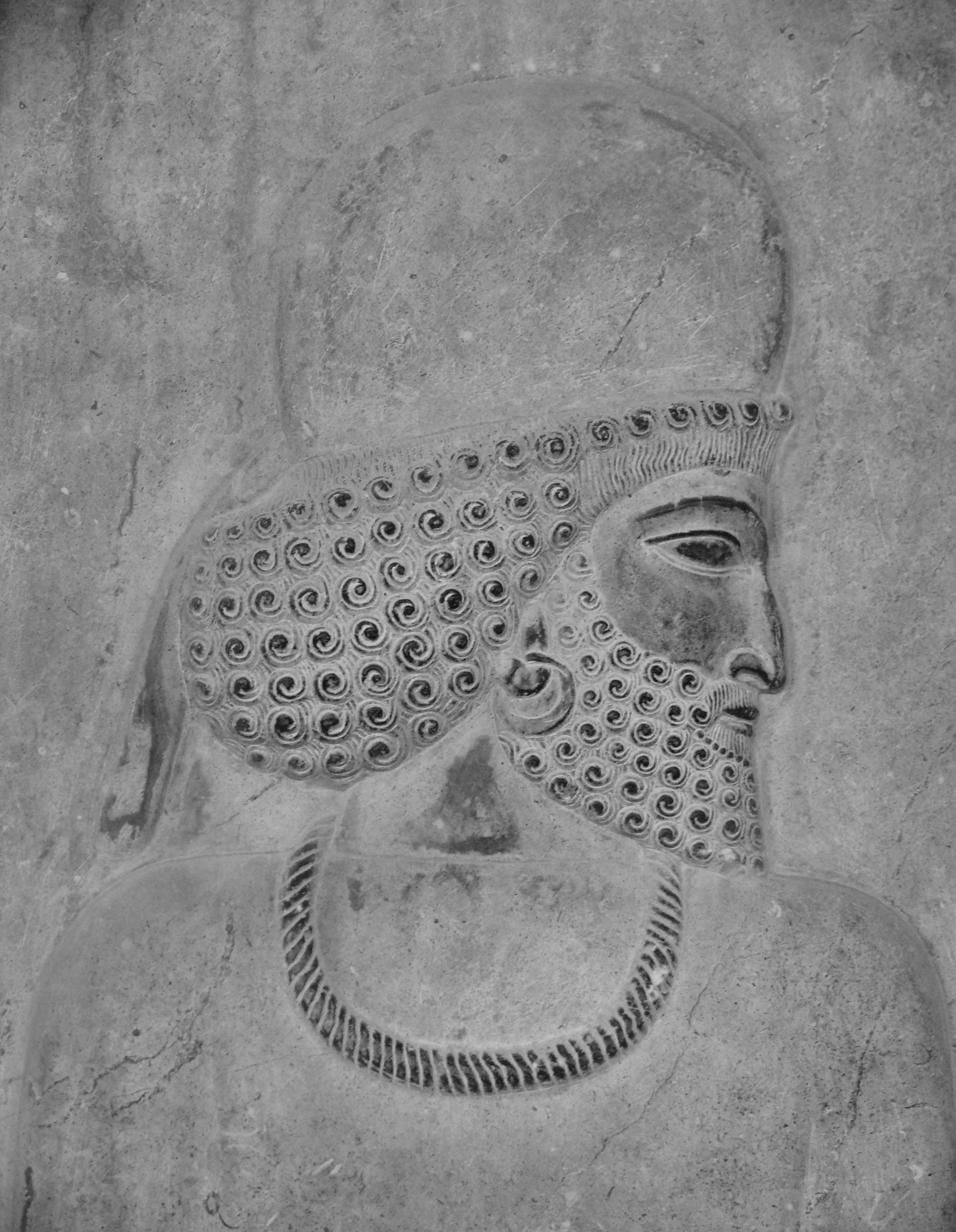
Image of a Mede depicted in Persepolis wearing kolah namadi

Kolah namadi (Persian: کلاه نمدی, kolāh namadī, pronounced: /koːˈlɒːh næmæˈdiː/) is a traditional Iranian wool felt hat worn by men in parts of Iran. They come in a variety of colors and shapes depending on the region in Iran or the clan that wears it. Today they are worn mostly for ceremonial purposes.

== Etymology ==
Kolāh is the Persian word for hat, whereas namad is the compressed wool that the hat is made from. Together, kolāh namadī means a hat made of namad (compressed wool).

== Process of production ==
Kolah namadi is a felt hat made out of wool. The hat is made out of sheep, camel or goat hair wool and compressed using heat and water. The wool is mixed with a binding material such as starch, oil, grease, eggs or soap and then given its form using a mold. The hat is shaped into the style specific to the people of the region.

The headwear of every Iranian man, from the shah to the lowest of subjects, was made of a black material, forming a black hat approximately one and a half feet tall, and dark gray in color with a shiny glow like black beetle shells. This material was made from the skin of a specific species of black goat and was considered the thinnest and finest of its kind in the eastern lands. The best and finest type of this hat material was made from the skin of a lamb, and the younger the lamb, the better the quality. The skin of a year-old lamb was used to make hats for ordinary people, while the skin of a newborn lamb was used for the shah's hat. This soft material was also used in delicate crafts. The only distinguishing feature of the Iranian headwear is the scarf that is wrapped around the round hat, and this feature is exclusive to kings, nobility, and high-ranking officials. For years, Kashmir had sent its shawls to Iran to promote these golden-embroidered scarves used by Iran's elite.

The variety in the shape and size of kolah in the Qajar period

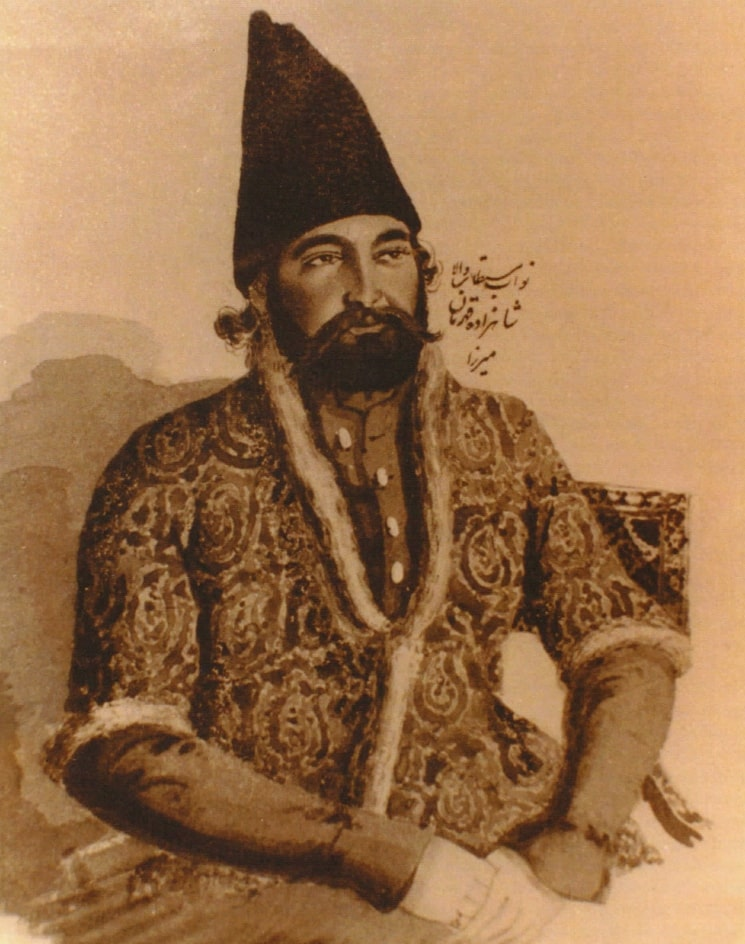

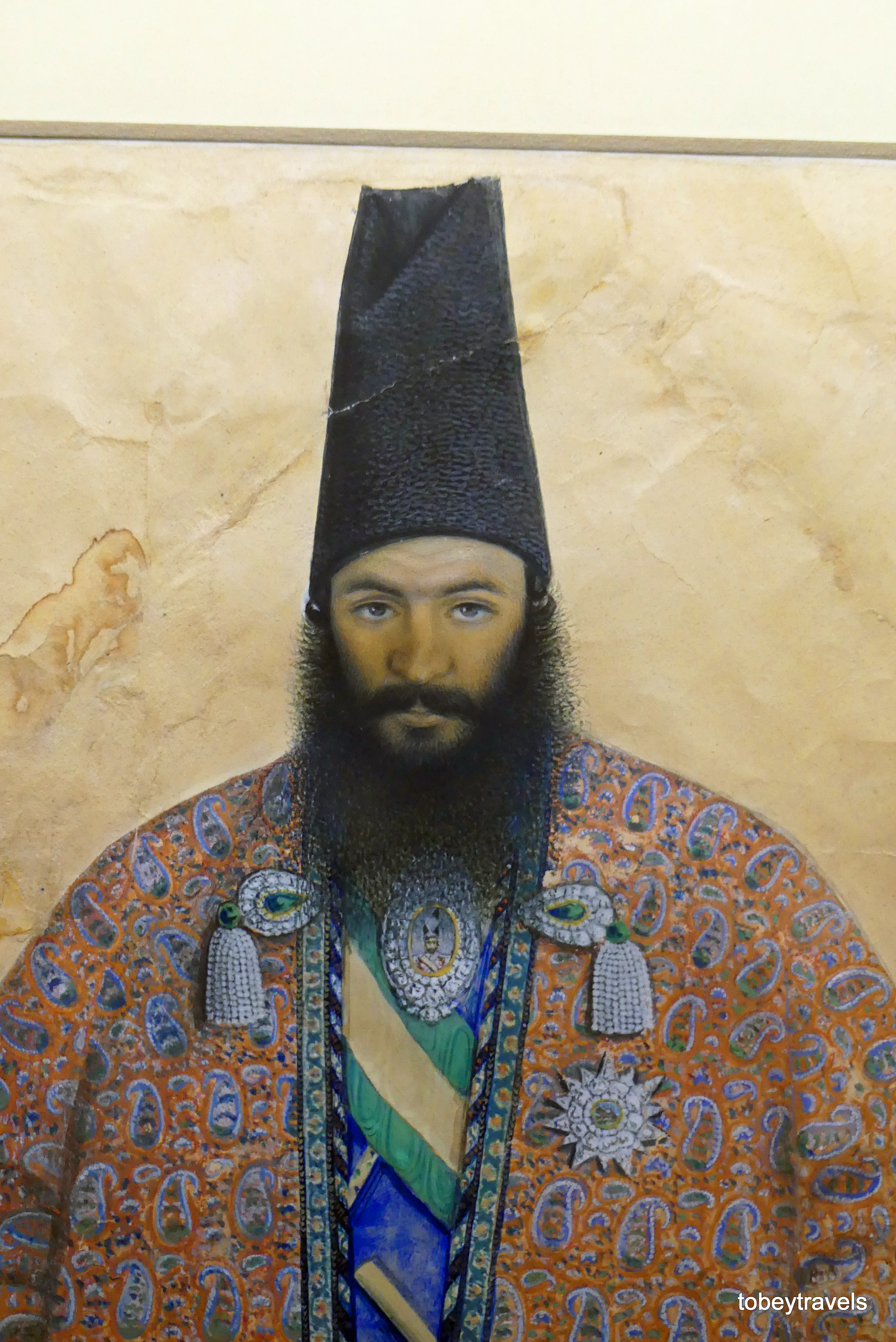

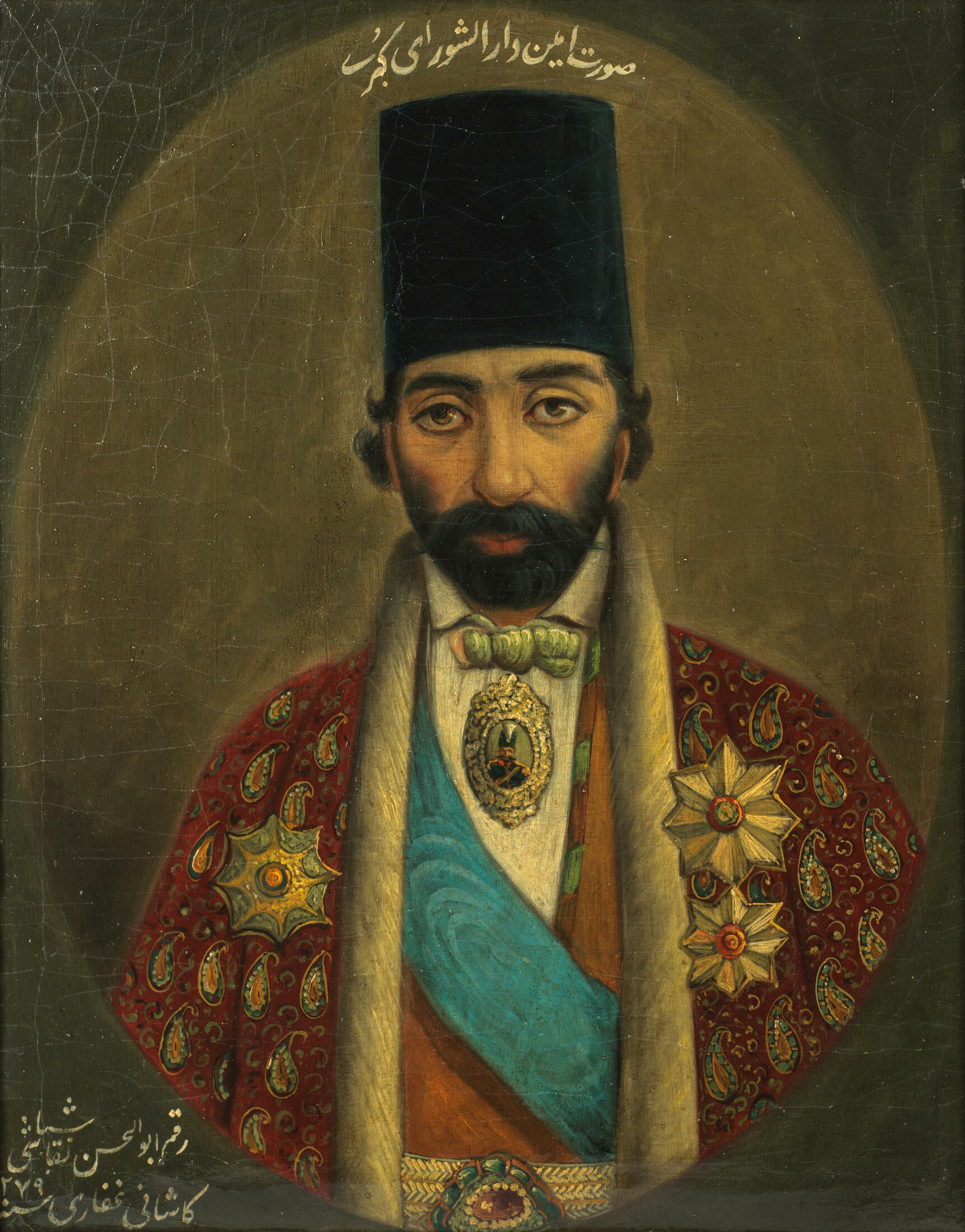

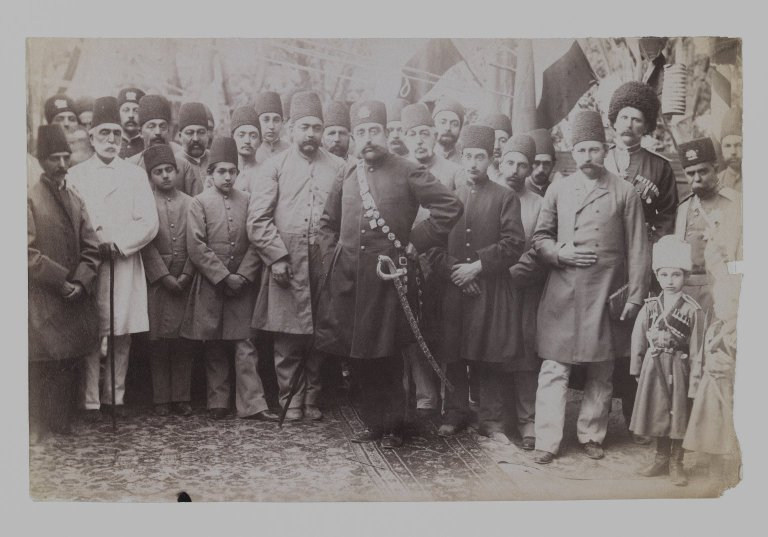

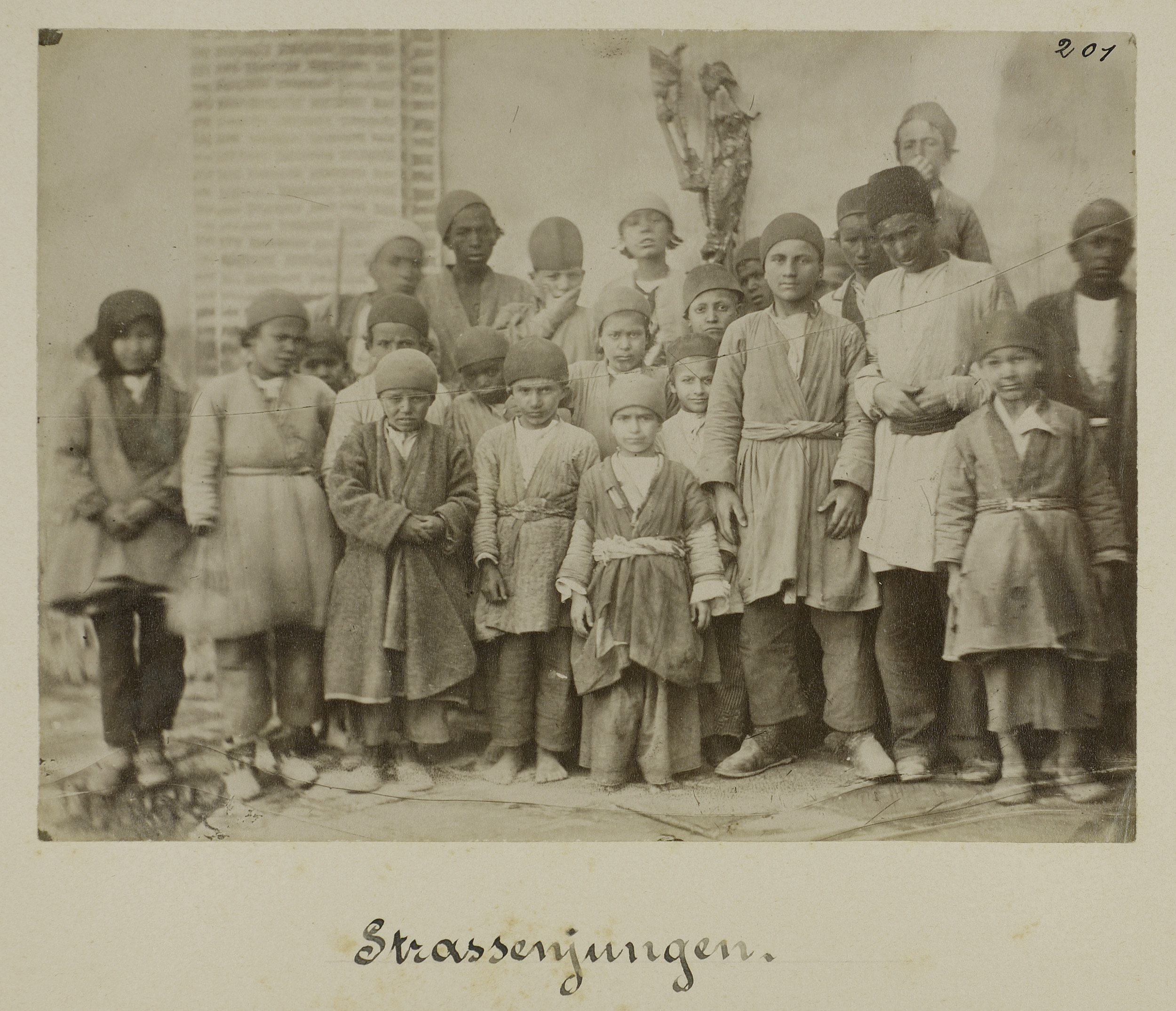

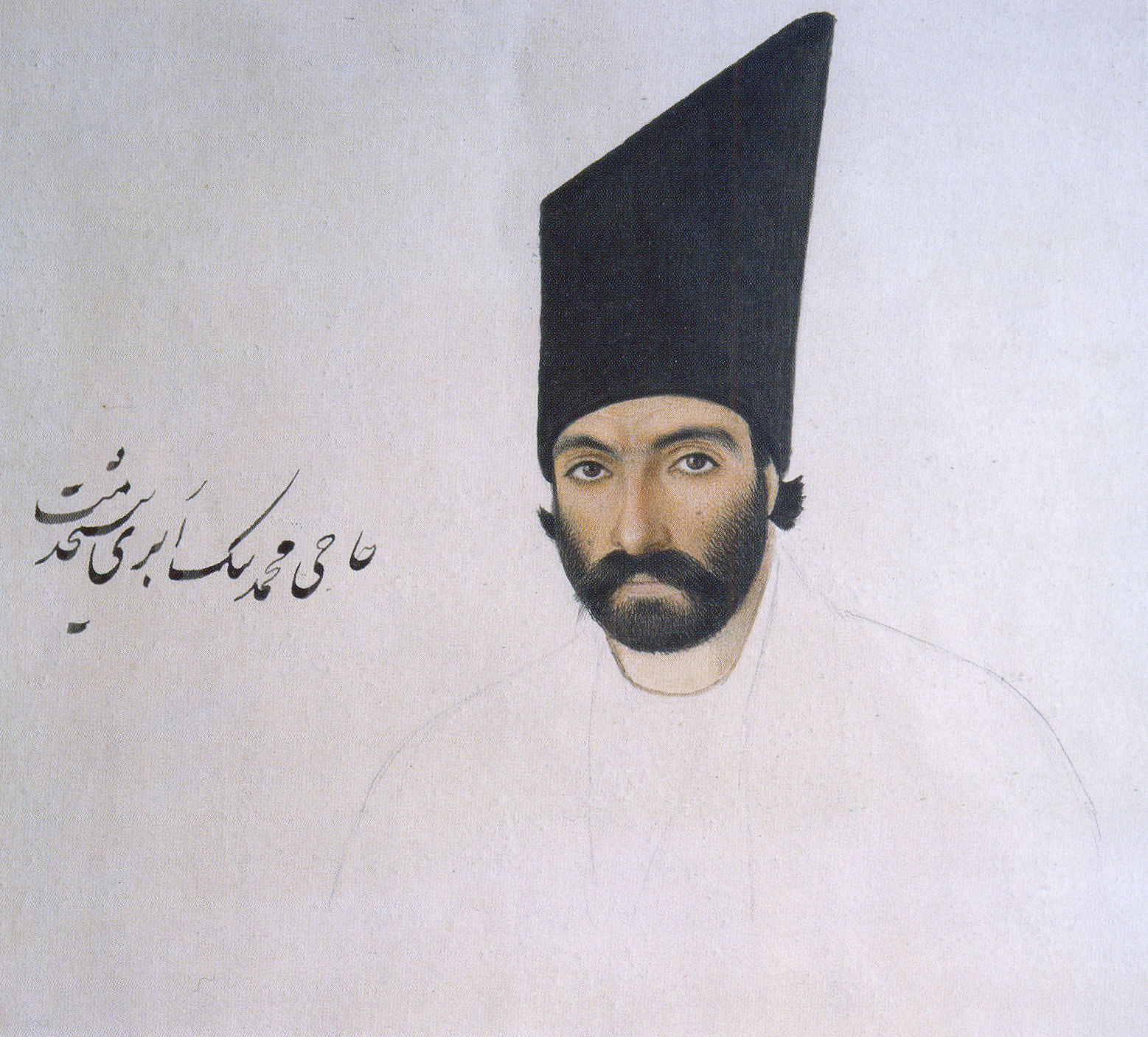

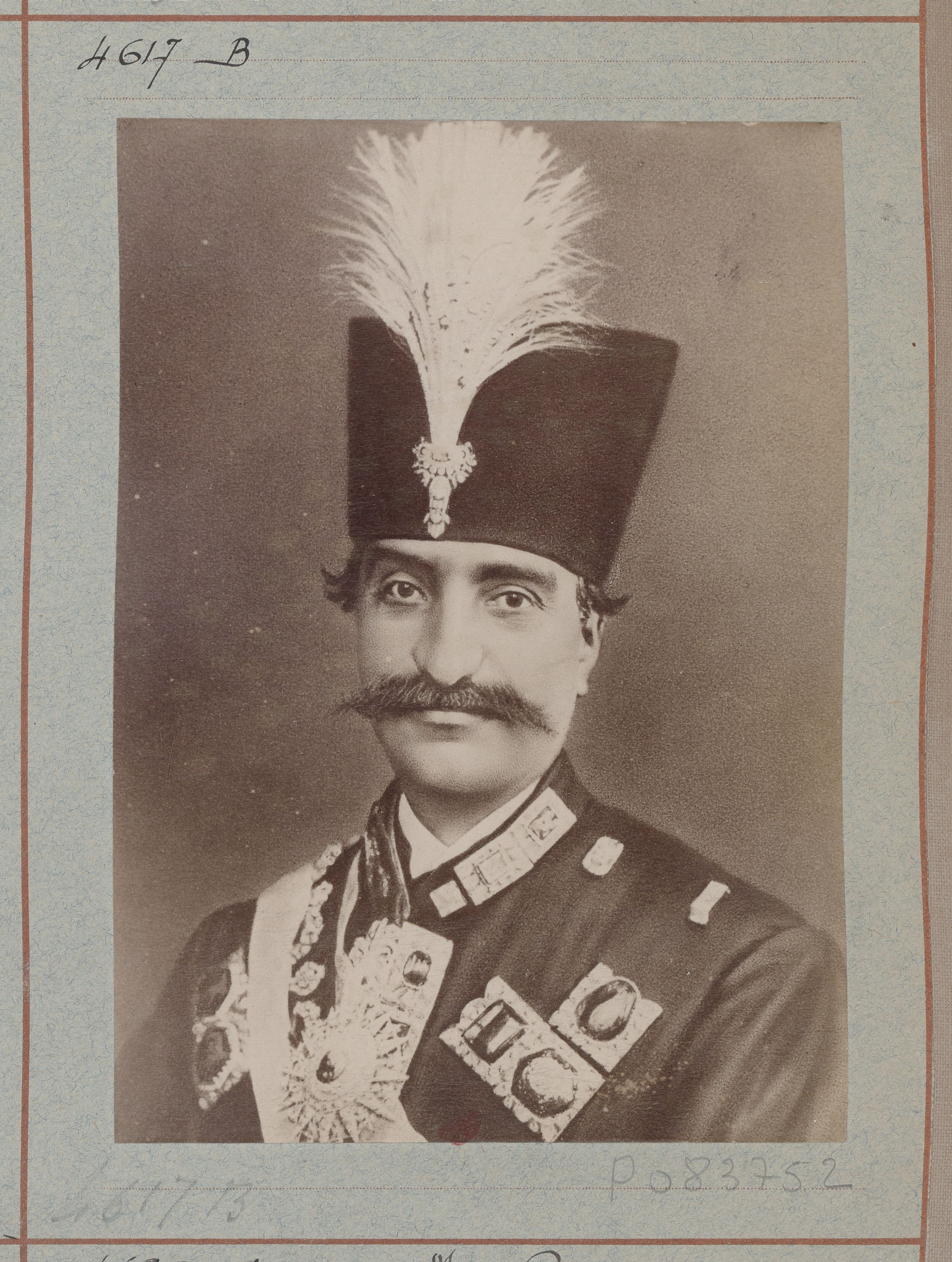

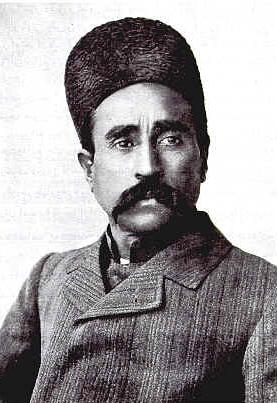

== History ==
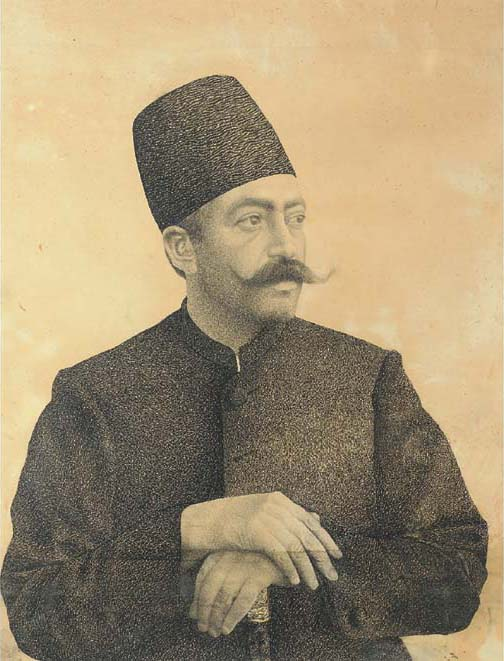
Drawing of Zahir al-Dawla, an impression of late Qajar kolah

The technique of felting was originally devised in Central Asia in the 5th to 3rd century B.C. Historically, wearing a hat was a symbol of honour and pride among Iranian men. Reliefs dating back to ancient Persia illustrate kolah namadi and were regular features of Persian and Greek art. In the early twentieth century, Iranian gangs of men used to wear kolāh namadī as an essential part of their identity and pride.

Namadi hats appear with particular frequency in Qajar art and imagery. This sudden spike in comparison to earlier dominance of turbans as the primary form of headgear can be attributed to the standardization of clothing under the Qajars. According to archaeologist and historian Maryam Ma’ani, Agha Mohammad Khan Qajar implemented a dress code intended to foster national unity and minimize visible class and ethnic distinctions—requiring men to wear a jobbeh, a kolah, and a sash, with variations in fabric quality reflecting social rank.

The kolah of the nobility and the wealthy was made from 'bukhara' fur, selected from the back of lambs. For individuals with higher incomes, this kolah was crafted from the pelts of local lambs, particularly those from Shiraz and Qom, priced between two and five tomans. Iranians also wore an 'araqchin' beneath the kolah, which women—especially those from Isfahan—embroidered with various designs.

== In popular culture ==
Kolah namadi is regularly featured in Iranian historical films. A 1966 romance film was also given the title Kolah Namadi (The Felt-Hatted Man)

== See also ==
- List of hat styles
- Fashion in Iran
