= Surrender at Datta Khel =

- Surrender at Datta Khel (Pakistan)
- Type: Capitulation
- Context: Conclusion of the Afghan tribal revolts of 1944–1947
- Location: Datta Khel, British India
- Effective: 11 January 1947
- Negotiators: Mazrak Zadran (surrendered); Sayyid Akbar (surrendered); (British Raj) "Political agent"
- Parties: Zadran tribe (surrendered); British Raj

On 11 January 1947, rebel leader Mazrak Zadran surrendered himself to British authorities at Datta Khel, concluding the Afghan tribal revolts of 1944–1947.

The tribal revolts began in February 1944 under Mazrak Zadran, chief of the Zadran tribe, whose followers inflicted defeats on the Afghan government in the early months of the war. Despite government efforts to contain the rebellion and offers of amnesty, Mazrak rejected peace terms and continued cross-border operations from British Waziristan while seeking support from the Faqir of Ipi. British authorities, wary of instability near India, aided Kabul with arms. Although most rebels surrendered after the government victory at Kunar Khas in late 1945, Mazrak and a small group of rebels held out into 1946.

On 11 January 1947, Mazrak entered Datta Khel in British-controlled Waziristan and surrendered to the political agent of North Waziristan, accompanied by at least two brothers, Sayyid Akbar Babrak and Sher Muhd Khan. The Government of India offered asylum on specified conditions, including monthly stipends for Mazrak, his family, and followers, and strict limits on travel and correspondence. In return, the British pledged not to hand him to Kabul. Mazrak accepted, ending his years-long insurgency. Afghanistan welcomed Mazrak's capitulation, noting it would allow withdrawal of expensive garrison forces that had been deployed in the southern province since 1944. Mazrak and Sayyid Akbar initially lived under supervision at Miranshah before being transferred to Abbottabad and confined under Regulation III of 1818 by May 1947.

== Background ==
The Afghan tribal revolts of 1944–1947 erupted in February 1944, with Mazrak Zadran, chief of the Zadran tribe, launching the original revolt. Throughout February and March 1944, the rebels repeatedly inflicted military defeats on the government, and by spring the rebels numbered 180,000. Throughout spring 1944, the government managed to localize the uprising, and offered Mazrak amnesty for him and his warriors, compensation for the damages inflicted by government troops, as well as a guarantee that he would remain the leader of his tribe. Mazrak refused, saying:

The current government deserves no trust, and its verbal assurances, intended to deceive the people, will achieve nothing. [...] (It) is treacherous, without honor or conscience, robbing its own people and completely indifferent to their suffering.

— Mazrak Zadran

Mazrak's strategy relied on cross-border operations to bolster his forces with tribal recruits from British Waziristan, and seeking support from the Faqir of Ipi. Seeking to preserve the pro-British government in Kabul, Britain collaborated with Afghanistan to defeat the rebels through aerial bombardment. In 1945, British support expanded to include arms and ammunition shipments.

In September 1945, Mohammad Daoud Khan managed to defeat rebel forces in the Siege of Kunar Khas, which Gerald Crichton, the British Charge de 'affairs in Kabul, described as the “turning point” of the tribal revolts. The Safi rebels, demoralized and deprived of loot, gradually dispersed, and by late October 1945 most had surrendered to General Daoud Khan. The settlement granted amnesty, eased conscription, and ended grain requisitions. However, a minority of rebels, including Mazrak, rejected the settlement.

In July 1946, Giles Squire, the British envoy in Kabul, wrote: "In the Southern Province the efforts of Mazrak and Sultan Ahmad to stir up trouble has been ineffective, largely because the tribesmen of Waziristan have been occupied with local affairs and because the Faqir of Ipi, in order to concentrate the greatest possible strength in opposition to the Government of India, has deprecated any diversion of forces against Afghanistan."

On 23 November 1946, Mohammed Dauod Khan gave the remaining Safi peace terms, which included the return of rifles and small arms ammunition captured from government troops, the surrender of Shahswar, Said Muhd, Salim Khan and Allahdadd Khan, the sale of grain to the government at reasonable rates, and the despatch of Safi youths to Kabul for education. Accordingly, the Safi surrendered in November 1946.

Also in November 1946, Sultan Ahmed, Mazrak's "principal colleague", surrendered to British authorities and was returned to Balochistan in custody. It was around this time that Mazrak was reported to be "tired of the unequal struggle" and only undecided as to whom he should to surrender to.

== Surrender ==
On 11 January 1947, Mazrak Zadran arrived at Datta Khel in British India, where he offered his surrender to the political agent of the North Waziristan agency. The political agent provided terms of surrender (see #Terms); Mazrak agreed. Mazrak was joined in this surrender by at least two of his brothers, Sayyid Akbar Babrak and Sher Muhd Khan.

=== Terms ===
The Government of India offer you asylum on the following terms:

- (1) You will be given a residential house to live in a place where the climate is moderate throughout the year; such as Abbottabad or its vicinity.
- (2) You will be allowed the following allowances by the Government of India:
  - (i) Rs. 200 p. m. for yourself.
  - (ii) Rs. 75 p. m. for each of your wives. (Note: Having multiple wives in common in the Muslim world; see Polygyny in Islam.)
  - (iii) Rs. 30 to Rs. 50 p. m. for each of your children according to age, and
  - (iv) Rs. 30 p. m. for each of your followers upto a maximum number of ten.
- (3) While in India you will not leave the district in which you settle, without the permission of the Government of India.
- (4) While in India you will not communicate with the Afghan Government or with any person in Afghanistan without the permission of the Government of India and will not carry on any intrigue against the Afghan Government.

Provided you agree to the above terms the Government of India will give you an assurance that you will not be handed over to the Afghan Government.

—

== Aftermath ==
The surrender at Datta Khel marked the end of the Afghan tribal revolts of 1944–1947. The Afghan Ministry of Defence stated that this would relieve them of much anxiety and enable them to withdraw two infantry brigades of the Kabul garrison from the Southern Province which had to be stationed there since 1944 at great expense to the Government. The cost of maintaining additional troops in Gardez, Matun and Urgun was very high as they could not be fed from local resources and everything had to be transported from Kabul by motor transport over indifferent roads.

Said Akbar had surrendered on Ithar as no terms had been communicated to him before his surrender. Subsequently, however, terms similar to those accepted by his brother were offered to him which he accepted.

Mazrak and Said Akbar lived with their families at Miranshah for several months, until the Government of India decided to move them to Abbottabad and to confine them under Regulation III of 1818. Consequently, the brothers arrived at Abbottabad and under two different warrants of the Governor-General in Council dated the 12 May 1947, were committed to the custody of the Deputy Commissioner, Hazara.

Said Akbar soon quarrelled with Mazrak and asked for separate accommodation for himself and his family. Government agreed to this and provided him another house, house No. 3259 in Kehil, Abbottabad. Because of the change of residence the previous warrant had to be cancelled and on 26 February 1948, a fresh warrant was issued by the Central Government placing him under personal restraint at the new house. This warrant was operative at the time of the incident.
