= Siege of Kunar Khas =

Coordinates: 34.6382°N 70.8675°E

- Part of the Afghan tribal revolts of 1944–1947
- Siege of Kunar Khas (Afghanistan)
| Date | Late August – 8 September 1945 |
| Location | Kunar Khas, Eastern Province, Afghanistan |
| Result | Afghan government victory |
| Territorial changes | Siege broken; Afghan government retains control of Kunar Khas |

Belligerents
| Afghanistan | Rebel tribes; Safi; Mohmand |

Commanders and leaders
| Garrison: (Kingdom of Afghanistan) Unknown; Relief force: (Kingdom of Afghanistan) Mohammad Daoud Khan | Unknown |

Units involved
| Royal Afghan Army; Afghan Air Force | |

Strength
| Garrison: 400; Relief force: Unknown | 1,500–2,000 |

The Siege of Kunar Khas was a military engagement during the Afghan tribal revolts of 1944–1947.

Before the onset of World War II, the Afghan government established military posts on the east bank of the Kunar river, which the Mohmand tribe had never approved of. In 1944, Afghan tribal revolts erupted, and by the end of July 1945 the rebels were on the offensive. It was in this context that the Mohmands saw a good opportunity to finally liquidate the garrison at Kunar Khas.

The siege began in late August 1945, with a mixed lashkar of roughly 1,500–2,000 Safi and Mohmand tribesmen surrounding a garrison of about 400 loyalist troops on the east bank of the Kunar River. Cut off from communication and supply, and with the river unbridged, government forces found themselves in a precarious position. Ramadan helped limit wider tribal mobilization, but the threat of a cascading insurgency across the Eastern Province and beyond pushed Kabul into urgent appeals for British Indian assistance.

British pressure on Mohmand tribes across the Durand Line and Indian air demonstrations hindered further rebel reinforcements, while Afghanistan secured tribal neutrality through a mix of threats and payments. An airlift kept the besieged troops supplied. Ultimately, on 8 September 1945, General Mohammad Daoud Khan exploited low river levels to ford troops across the Kunar and break the siege on the eve of Eid al-Fitr, dispersing the rebel force.

Gerald Crichton, the British Charge de 'affairs in Kabul, described the loyalist victory at Kunar Khas as the "turning point" of the tribal revolts. The Safi rebels, demoralized and deprived of loot, gradually dispersed, and by late October 1945, most had surrendered to General Daoud Khan. The settlement granted amnesty, eased conscription, and ended grain requisitions. However, a minority of rebels rejected the settlement, and the tribal revolts subsisted until January 1947.

== Background ==
Before the onset of World War II, the Afghan government established military posts on the east bank of the Kunar river, which the Mohmand tribe had never approved of. In 1944, Afghan tribal revolts erupted, and by the end of July 1945 the rebels were on the offensive. It was in this context that the Mohmands saw a good opportunity to finally liquidate the Afghan garrison at Kunar Khas.

== Siege ==
=== Start date ===
Historical accounts agree that the siege began in August 1945, though there is some discrepancy regarding the chronology:

- In a report dated 1 February 1946, Gerald Crichton, British Charge de 'affairs in Kabul, writes that the siege was broken on 8 September 1945 after 17 days of siege, implying that the siege began on 22 August 1945.
- In contrast. Alexander Lancaster (the British Military Attaché at Kabul, reporting on 15 November 1945) writes that the siege lasted 14 days, though he does not provide specific start or end dates. If Crichton's end date of 8 September is correct, this would imply the siege began on 25 August.
- Ben Acheson, writing in 2023, simply states that the siege began in August 1945.

=== Siege begins ===
Engaged on both banks of an unbridged river and with all their communications either cut or threatened by the enemy, the Afghan forces were soon in a most unhappy plight. Fortunately for them, the operations coincided with the fasting month of Ramadan, a factor which contributed to keeping many potential rebels at home, but even so, their position in places was critical. The crisis came to a head towards the end of August with the close investment of a garrison of 400 men at Kunar Khas on the east bank of the river by a mixed lashkar of some 1,500–2,000 tribesmen. The immediate danger was that Afghan troops, here or elsewhere in the valley, might suffer a major reverse. In that event, the resultant loss of Afghan military prestige and the prospect of loot might well have caused the neighbouring tribes, both British and Afghan, hitherto standing aside, to throw their full weight on the side of the insurgents, a development which would almost certainly have resulted in complete military disaster in the Kunar and the collapse of Government control in the Eastern Province.

Such a situation could not have failed to have had serious reactions elsewhere in the country, notably in the Southern Province, the powder magazine of Afghanistan, where Mazrak, the rebellious Zadran leader, with the assistance of Sultan Ahmad, the latest of a series of pretenders to the Afghan throne to appear on this part of the border, was endeavouring to raise the tribes against the Government. With their military resources stretched to the utmost between the Eastern and Southern Provinces, the operational value of their small air force impaired by a shortage of bombs, and the general population critical and discontented by the shortage of commodities and high prices, the prospect confronting the Afghan Government was anything but pleasant. It was, in fact, in the opinion of qualified observers, about the most dangerous situation in which the government had been placed since the Ghilzai rebellion of 1938. The key to safety or disaster clearly lay in the Kunar Valley. If the Afghan forces there could regain the initiative and drive off the insurgents investing their posts before the end of Ramadan added to the enemy's strength, there seemed a fair chance that confidence would be restored and the rot arrested. The Afghan Government were not slow to appreciate this once the full implications of their unpleasant situation were revealed, and if their alarm was at times considerable it has to be admitted that they never lost grip and, indeed, faced their troubles bravely and with energy.

=== Afghan government appeals for British intervention ===
At an early stage they had appealed to the Government of British India to restrain the Mohmands living east of the Durand Line from joining in the hostilities. This raised awkward issues, for the Durand Line in this area, since it was drawn in 1893, has never been accepted by the rulers of Afghanistan. The line of tribal responsibility as between the Indian and Afghan Governments is consequently indeterminate. There are, in fact, two boundaries, both undemarcated, one the Durand Line and the other the Presumptive Border, the latter intended to show the eastern and southern boundary of certain villages collectively known as the Bohai Dag which the Government of India in 1896 offered to concede to the Afghans in settlement of the dispute, an offer which had not been accepted as of 1945. The area between these two lines, usually referred to as the "Presumptive Area," was thus a sort of no-man's land under no defined control.

The nuisance value of this unsatisfactory situation has always been appreciated and often exploited by the inhabitants of the area; more often than not to the disadvantage of the Government of India. On this occasion it recoiled on the Afghan Government. At first, deliberately forgetful or ignorant of the position stated above, and misled by wildly inaccurate reports from the battle area, the Afghan Government made a great show of indignation at the invasion of Afghanistan by hordes of "British" [sic] tribesmen, and demands were made on the legation for transmission to the Government of India for immediate punitive action, including air bombing, on the British side of the line. But this phase was short-lived. Acting on instructions, the British Chargé d'Affaires explained the political position of the Presumptive area, with the aid of maps, to the Prime Minister and made it clear that, while the Government of India admitted no direct responsibility, they would do their best to restrain the Mohmands as a measure of self-protection to a friendly neighbour, and if compelled to take action, would make it clear to the tribes that they were acting with the concurrence of the Afghan Government.

This demarche was accepted without demur, and the Government of India thereupon ordered the Mohmands of the Bohai Dag, on pain of punishment, to cease all hostile activities against the Afghan Government and to withdraw their tribesmen from the Kunar valley. Simultaneously, air demonstrations in strength were made over the area and warning leaflets dropped. There can be no doubt that these measures, by keeping large numbers of Mohmands east of the Durand Line at home and by securing the withdrawal of most of those already with the lashkar, considerably eased the situation in the Kunar. At the same time, as further evidence of their goodwill and desire to help, the Government of India accelerated the emergent supply of military equipment and munitions to the Afghan Government and the sight of this war material passing westward through the Khyber Pass in impressive convoys at a critical time also tended to steady the tribes. For all these friendly acts of the Government of India the Afghan Prime Minister was subsequently to express the profound gratitude of his Government.

=== Airlift ===
Meanwhile, the Afghans themselves had not been idle. By a combination of threat and lavish bribery they secured the neutrality of the larger tribes in the Eastern Province and largely succeeded in insulating the trouble in the Kunar. Their poor and ill-found troops, never famous for fighting to the last man and cartridge, hung on to their positions in the valley with unexpected tenacity, being precariously supplied from the air in the later stages.

At one point during this airlift, a pilot crash-landed in rebel territory in the Mazar or Pech Daras, where Safi tribesmen knifed him in the back and cut his throat from ear to ear. A number of villagers found him unconscious near his aircraft and tended to his wounds, allowing for his survival. He was soon back in Kabul.

The small Afghan air force, reinvigorated by a fresh supply of bombs from India and undeterred by the fate of their pilot, bombed and machine-gunned the enemy with unflagging zeal, if not with much accuracy or effect. Communications were kept just open somehow, the lack of bridges across the Kunar being compensated for by the use of improvised rafts, often with fatal results to the passengers. The Afghan air force supplied the garrison with food and small arms ammunition, which, in light of it being cut off from land supply, was decisive in helping the garrison endure the siege.

=== Breaking the siege ===
On the night of 8 September, the eve of Eid al-Fitr, when all good Muslims may reasonably expect to be allowed to relax and rejoice after the rigours of Ramadan, General Mohammad Daoud Khan, with probably just this consideration in mind, took advantage of the low state of the river to ford it with a considerable body of troops and assaulted the lashkar surrounding Kunar Khas. This enterprise, though falling clearly within the mischief of the Dirty Trick Act by tribal standards, met with success. The garrison, after weeks of close siege and near starvation, was relieved and the lashkar driven off and scattered.

== Aftermath ==
Gerald Crichton, the British Chargé d'affaires in Kabul, described the rebel defeat at Kunar Khas as the "turning point" of the tribal revolts. Defeated in the field, deprived of the prospect of immediate loot and with their homes threatened by air action on both sides of the border, the tribesmen lost heart and gradually melted away. Sniping and sporadic attacks on posts continued for some time, but by the end of October most of the Safis had submitted to General Daoud Khan. The terms of the settlement included, among other things, the postponement or abandonment by the Afghan government of the conscription issue, amnesty to all rebels, and the end of forced grain requisitions. It was, in fact, a thoroughly unsatisfactory war for the Afghan government. They lost heavily in treasure, lives and arms, and had nothing to show on the credit side — not even enhanced prestige. A minority of Safi, as well as Mazrak Zadran, rejected the peace agreement; the former surrendered in November 1946 and the latter in January 1947.
