= Amanat Lewana =

Afghan Safi rebel leader

Prime Minister of Afghanistan (Eastern Province only)
- In office c. 1944–c. 1946
- Monarch: Salemai
- Preceded by: Mohammad Hashim Khan
- Succeeded by: Unclear – Mohammad Hashim Khan or Shah Mahmud Khan

Personal details
- Tribe: Safi

Military service
- Battles/wars: Afghan tribal revolts of 1944–1947

Amanat Lewana (fl. 1940s) was an Afghan politician who served as prime minister under Salemai, a king of Afghanistan who ruled only in the Eastern Province.

== Background ==
In either 1944 or 1945, the Safi tribe rose up against the government of the Kingdom of Afghanistan. According to British records, the uprising was caused by the Afghan government's attempts to institute conscription among the Safi, trading monopolies granted to Afghan merchant companies, and government surveillance. However, Whit Mason attributes the Safi uprising to "extremely brutal taxation, oppression and poverty". Among the more enthusiastic rebel fighters were younger men with more to gain and less to lose from fighting the government. The Afghan government extensively deployed its air force against the rebels, using aircraft to drop leaflets, gun down tribesmen and drop incendiary bombs.

== Prime minister ==
Religious scholars among the Safi ruled that anyone who rebelled against their King and died should be excluded from being counted as martyrs. Therefore, they were required to select one of their own as king. According to Whit Mason's version of events in The Rule of Law in Afghanistan: Missing in Inaction (2011), in either 1944 or 1945, the Safi selected Shahswar as king, Salemai as prime minister and Amanul Mulk as minister of defence. However, Mason appears to mix up several roles. David B. Edwards, a veteran scholar of Afghan history, gives the following quote from Amanul Mulk (whom Edwards interviewed personally) in Caravan of Martyrs: Sacrifice and Suicide Bombing in Afghanistan (2017), which appears to confirm that Amanat Lewana was Prime Minister instead of Salemai:

We called Amanat Lewana ["mad," parroting the popular epithet for the unpopular Daud Khan]. He was our prime minister. Shasawar was minister. Salimai was king, and i was minister of defense. We used these titles because we were fighting against an Islamic king.... The mullahs told us to select one elder and call him king, and if the government attacks beyond the road, then you should also attack them. In that case, your death does not become kharob. This king should order the people to accept his order, and your death would not become wrong. This order to fight was given to us by mullahs. The elders told us to accept these orders.

— Amanul Mulk, 1983 interview

The Safi were ultimately defeated by the Afghan government.
