= Muhammad Umar Babrakzai =

Afghan tribal chief

- محمد عمر ببرکزی
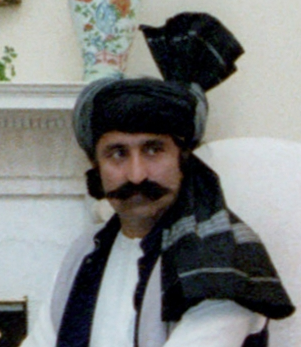
- Babrakzai in 1983

Tribal chief of the Zadran tribe
- Incumbent
- Assumed office before 1980
- Preceded by: Unknown, possibly Abdulla Khan Jadran Yawan

Supreme Court justice
- In office c. 1960/70s – before 1979

Muhammad Umar Babrakzai (fl. 1980 – present) is the tribal chief of the Zadran tribe and Afghan jurist.

== Background and early life ==
Babrakzai is the grandson of Babrak Khan, a previous Zadran chieftain who died in 1924, though it's unclear through what father.

It is unknown who preceded Babrakzai as chieftain. It was possibly Abdulla Khan Jadran Yawan, who was chieftain as of 1969, although it's unclear if Babrakzai was Abdulla's immediate successor or if someone else was chieftain between them.

At some point, Babrakzai moved to France where he received an education. Upon returning to Afghanistan, he became part of Kingdom of Afghanistan's elite. At some point after King Mohammed Zahir Shah initiated a period of democratic reforms with the 1964 constitution, Babrakzai served as Supreme Court justice.

== Tribal chief ==
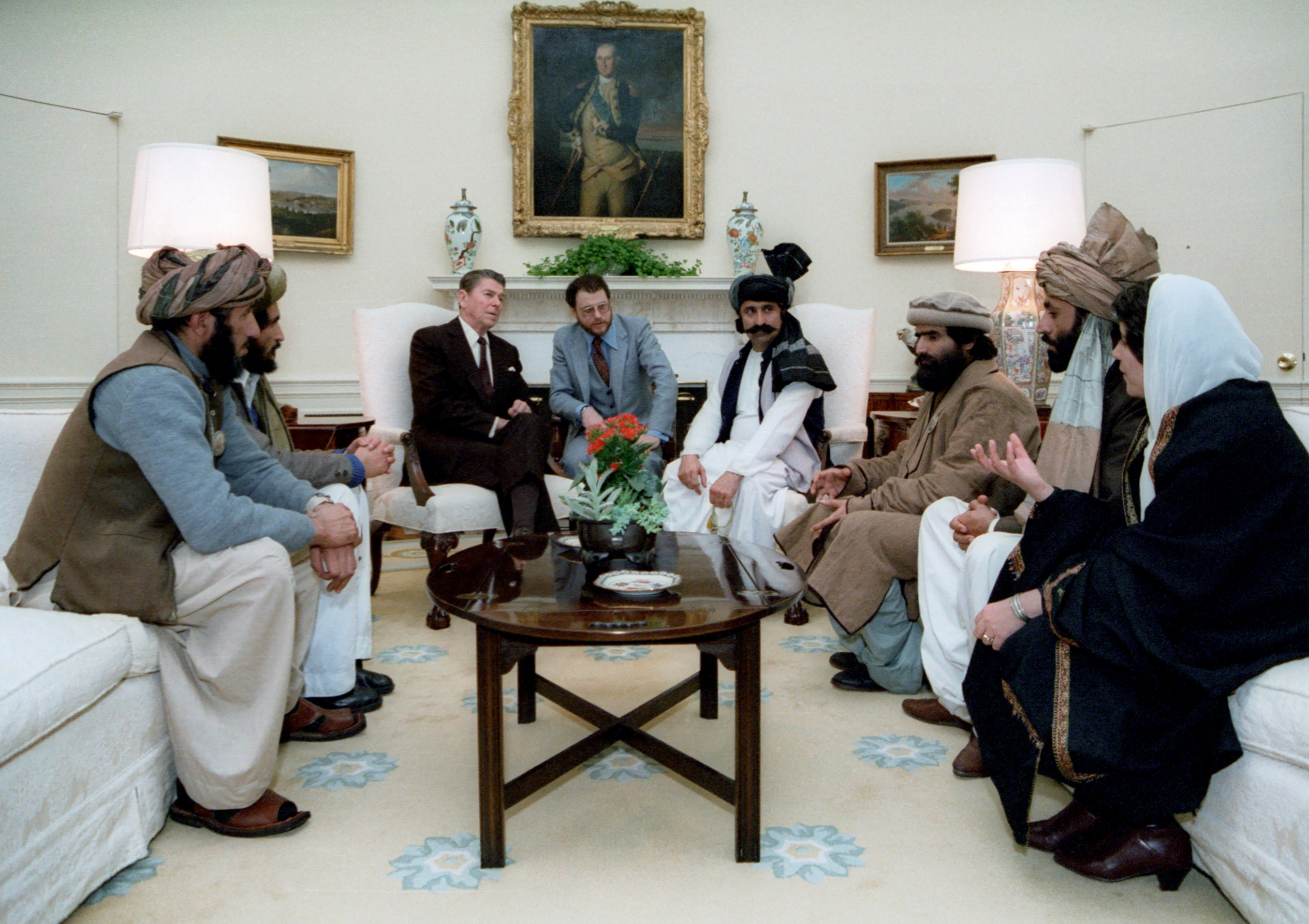
Babrakzai attending a meeting with Ronald Reagan in 1983.

Babrakzai opposed the Soviet invasion of Afghanistan in 1979. The authors of Out of Afghanistan describe him as being the "prime mover" of the initial Afghan resistance, due to him forming a "national council" to map out an Afghan response. He joined the National Islamic Front of Afghanistan, became the chairman of a pro-resistance loya jirga, and also organized a jirga in Peshawar. In addition, Babrakzai maintained contacts with France during this period, and helped French activists to set up an International People's Tribunal in Paris.

Babrakzai continued to resist the Soviets during the rest of the Soviet–Afghan War. In 1983, he attended a meeting with US president Ronald Reagan. An image of this meeting later became an internet meme, where Babrakzai and other members of the meeting were falsely described as Taliban officials, even though the Taliban had not been formed yet by that time. Despite his regional influence, however, Babrakzai had little control over the militants in his tribal territories, over whom Jalaluddin Haqqani gained more control.

Babrakzai continues to be tribal chief as of 2019.

== Family ==
Mazar Khan fl. late 19th century
Babrak Khan d. October 1924	Khan Muhammad
Mazrak Zadran fl. 1900s – 1972	Sayyid Akbar Babrak b. 1921 or 1922 d. 16 Oct 1951	Sher Muhd Khan fl. 1924 – 1947	Izmair fl. 1924 – 1945	5 or 14 others (Note: Sources disagree how many sons Babrak had - Jamna Das Akhtar states that Babrak had 18 sons, while a Pakistani government inquiry titled The Assassination of Mr. Liaquat Ali Khan states that Babrak had 9 sons. David B. Edwards states that Babrak had 2 sons, but this appears to be false, as at least 4 of his son's names are known.)
Dilawar Khan b. 1939 or 1940	Muhammad Umar Babrakzai (Note: Muhammad Umar Babrakzai was Babrak Khan's grandchild although it's unclear through what father.) fl. 1980
