= Assassination of Liaquat Ali Khan =

1951 murder in Rawalpindi, Pakistan

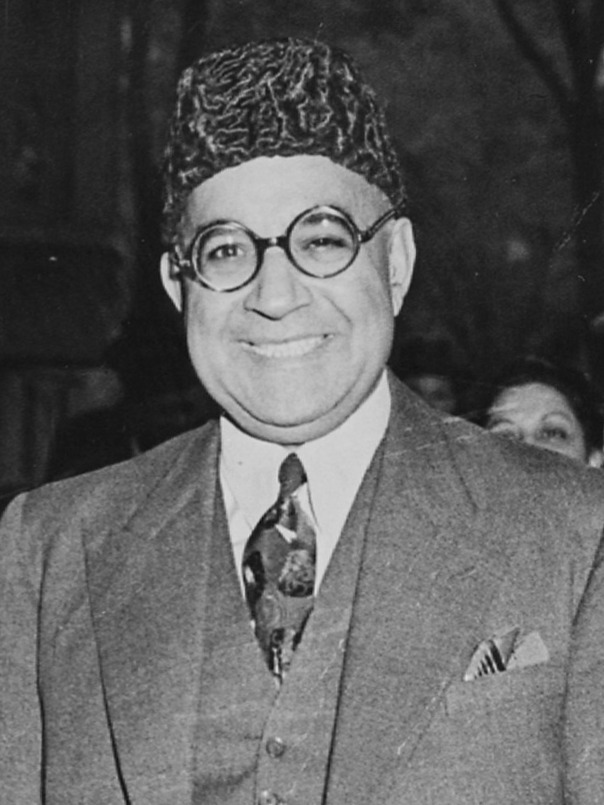
- Khan in 1950, a year before his assassination
- Location: Company Bagh, Rawalpindi
- Date: 16 October 1951; 75 years ago c. 4:30 pm
- Target: Liaquat Ali Khan
- Attack type: political assassination; shooting
- Weapon: .22 calibre (5.6 mm) pistol
- Motive: Unknown
- Verdict: Guilty
- Convictions: Murder
- Convicted: Sayyid Akbar

On 16 October 1951, at approximately 4:30 pm, Liaquat Ali Khan, who was the first prime minister of Pakistan, was shot dead while addressing a gathering at Company Bagh (known today as Liaquat Bagh) in Rawalpindi. The police immediately shot Sayyid Akbar, the murderer who was later identified as an Afghan national. The assassination of Khan remains one of the most significant and unresolved political murders in Pakistan's history.

Khan had served as the first Prime Minister of Pakistan since its creation in 1947, and he was one of the central figures in the country's early political and economic development. His leadership was marked by efforts to stabilize the newly-formed nation, promote economic reforms, and strengthen ties with the United States and the Soviet Union during the Cold War. His death left the country in political turmoil and uncertainty, with numerous theories surrounding the motives and the identity of the true mastermind.

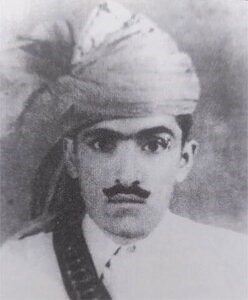
Photo of Sayyid Akbar released by the government of Pakistan

In the wake of his assassination, the investigation quickly pointed to Sayyid Akbar, but little was discovered about his background or the reasoning behind his actions. Theories surrounding the assassination range from personal grievances to speculation about a conspiracy involving foreign or domestic interests, though no conclusive evidence has emerged to date. Khan's death created a power vacuum in Pakistan's leadership, and the country struggled with political instability in the years that followed.

== Assassination ==
Official Pakistani government report on Liaquat's assassination

While addressing a massive crowd of approximately 100,000 people at Company Bagh (Company Gardens) in Rawalpindi, Khan was shot twice in the chest. Akbar was swiftly shot and killed by the police. Akbar was known to the Pakistani authorities, with prior involvement in criminal activities. He had a history of links with extremist groups, though his precise motivations remained unclear.

After the shooting, Khan was immediately rushed to a nearby hospital, where doctors performed a blood transfusion in a desperate attempt to save his life. However, he succumbed to his injuries shortly thereafter.

The motive behind the assassination of Khan remains one of the most debated and mysterious aspects of his death. While various theories exist, none have been conclusively proven. Some suggest political motivations, pointing to Khan's policies, particularly his alignment with the West during the Cold War, as a possible factor. An influential theory proposed by an Urdu daily in Bhopal, India, speculated that American intelligence agencies may have played a role in orchestrating the assassination due to Khan's foreign policy stance.

Upon his death, Khan was posthumously given the title of "Shaheed-e-Millat," meaning "Martyr of the Nation." His death deeply impacted the nation, which struggled to cope with the loss of its first Prime Minister. Khan was laid to rest in Mazar-e-Quaid, Karachi, alongside the tomb of Muhammad Ali Jinnah, Pakistan's founder.

The location of his assassination, Company Bagh, was later renamed Liaquat Bagh in his honor. The site, which had been a major gathering spot in Rawalpindi, became a symbol of national pride and remembrance. Liaquat Bagh was also the site of the 2007 assassination of former Prime Minister Benazir Bhutto.

Despite numerous investigations, the true nature of the conspiracy, if one existed, and the identity of the forces behind the assassination remain unresolved. Some believe that domestic political rivalries, including opposition from military and feudal elites, may have contributed to the planning of Khan's death. His assassination created a power vacuum that led to increased military influence in Pakistan's political landscape, which would dominate the country's future trajectory.

In a 1972 interview, Akbar's brother, Mazrak Zadran, denied that his brother killed the prime minister.
