= Amanul Mulk =

Afghan Safi rebel leader

Afghan Minister of Defence (Eastern Province only)
- In office c. 1944–c. 1946
- Monarch: Salemai
- Prime Minister: Amanat Lewana

Personal details
- Died: c. 2011 Peshawar, Pakistan
- Tribe: Safi

Military service
- Battles/wars: Afghan tribal revolts of 1944–1947

Amanul Mulk (Pashto: امان الملک) (died c. 2011) was an Afghan politician who served as the Minister of Defence under Salemai, who ruled only in the Eastern Province.

== Background ==
In either 1944 or 1945, the Safi tribe rose up against the government of the Kingdom of Afghanistan. According to British records, the uprising was caused by the Afghan government's attempts to institute conscription among the Safi, trading monopolies granted to Afghan merchant companies, and government surveillance. However, Whit Mason attributes the Safi uprising to "extremely brutal taxation, oppression and poverty".

== Minister of Defence ==
Religious scholars among the Safi ruled that anyone who rebelled against their King and died should be excluded from being counted as martyrs. Therefore, they were required to select one of their own as king. In either 1944 or 1945, the Safi selected Salemai as king, Amanat Lewana as prime minister and Amanul Mulk as minister of defence. The Safi were ultimately defeated by the Afghan government.

== Later life and death ==
In 1947, Mulk had a reunion in Shulgara with Shahswar and Salemai. Mulk eventually left Afghanistan, and lived in Peshawar by the 1980s.

In 1983, he met with historian David B. Edwards, who described him as being an "old man" by this time. Edwards interviewed Mulk on the Safi role in the tribal revolts of 1944–1947.

In The Rule of Law in Afghanistan: Missing in Inaction, released in April 2011, it is stated that Amanul Mulk "died recently in Peshawar", that he continued wearing a military jacket until his last days, and that his offspring still live in Shulgara.
