= Salemai =

Afghan rebel king

King of Afghanistan (Eastern Province only)
- In office c. 1944–c. 1946
- Prime Minister: Amanat Lewana
- Preceded by: Mohammed Zahir Shah
- Succeeded by: Mohammed Zahir Shah

Personal details
- Tribe: Safi

Military service
- Battles/wars: Afghan tribal revolts of 1944–1947

Salemai or Salimai (fl. 1940s) was an Afghan rebel king who ruled only in the Eastern Province.

== Background ==
In either 1944 or 1945, the Safi tribe rose up against the government of the Kingdom of Afghanistan. According to British records, the uprising was caused by the Afghan government's attempts to institute conscription among the Safi, trading monopolies granted to Afghan merchant companies, and government surveillance. Whit Mason attributes the Safi uprising to "extremely brutal taxation, oppression and poverty".

== King ==
Religious scholars among the Safi ruled that anyone who rebelled against their king and died should be excluded from being counted as martyrs. Therefore, they were required to select one of their own as king. According to Whit Mason's version of events in The Rule of Law in Afghanistan (2011), in either 1944 or 1945, the Safi selected Shahswar as king, Salemai as prime minister and Amanul Mulk as minister of defence. However, Mason appears to mix up several roles. David B. Edwards, a veteran scholar of Afghan history, gives the following quote from Amanul Mulk (whom Edwards interviewed personally) in Caravan of Martyrs (2017), which appears to confirm that Salemai was king and not prime minister:

We called Amanat Lewana ["mad," parroting the popular epithet for the unpopular Daud Khan]. He was our prime minister. Shasawar was minister. Salimai was king, and i was minister of defense. We used these titles because we were fighting against an Islamic king.... The mullahs told us to select one elder and call him king, and if the government attacks beyond the road, then you should also attack them. In that case, your death does not become kharob. This king should order the people to accept his order, and your death would not become wrong. This order to fight was given to us by mullahs. The elders told us to accept these orders.

— Amanul Mulk, 1983 interview

By the end of October 1945, most of the Safis, except for a few die-hards had come to terms with the Afghan government. This peace agreement included among other things the abandonment or postponement of Safi conscription.

On 23 November 1946, Mohammed Daoud Khan gave the remaining Safi peace terms, which included the return of rifles and small arms ammunition captured from government troops, the surrender of Shahswar, Said Muhd, Salim Khan and Allah Khan, the sale of grain to the government at reasonable rates, and the despatch of Safi youths to Kabul for education. It is unclear if the Safi accepted these terms, but all sources agree that the Safi uprising had subsided by the end of 1946.

== Later life ==
In 1947, Salemai had a reunion in Shulgara with Shahswar and Amanul Mulk. Afterwards, Salemai fades out of the historical record.
