= Afghan tribal revolts of 1944–1947 =

Tribal conflict in Afghanistan

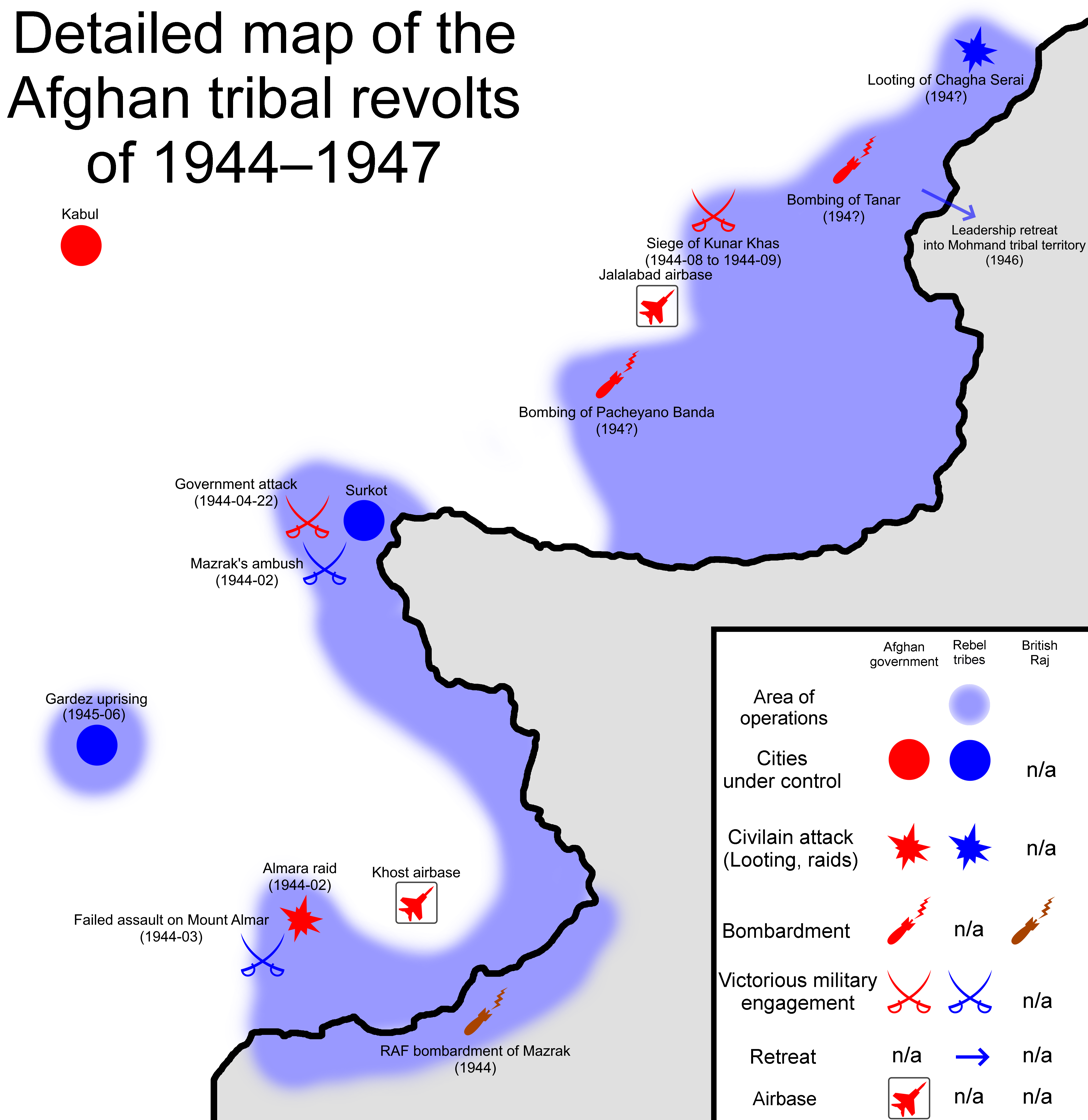
- Detailed map of the Afghan tribal revolts of 1944–1947.
Date	February 1944 – 11 January 1947
Location	Kingdom of Afghanistan minor spillover across the Durand Line into the British Raj
Result	Afghan government victory

Belligerents
Afghanistan • Allied Nuristani and Shinwari tribesmen United Kingdom (1944) • India	Rebel tribes: Zadran (1944–1947); Safi (until 1946); Mangal (1945)

Commanders and leaders
(Kingdom of Afghanistan) Mohammad Zahir Shah; (Kingdom of Afghanistan) Mohammad Daoud Khan; (Kingdom of Afghanistan) Mohammad Hashim Khan; (Kingdom of Afghanistan) Shah Mahmud Khan; (British Raj) Archibald Wavell	Mazrak Zadran (surrendered) (Zadran); Salemai (Safi); Unknown (Mangal); ... and others

Units involved
(Kingdom of Afghanistan) 2–3 brigades (Deployed against Mazrak) (Kingdom of Afghanistan) 28 Hawker Hind aircraft (9 peak deployed) Royal Air Force	Unknown

Strength
(Kingdom of Afghanistan); 110,000 (Full size of Afghan army, 1945) (British Raj); Unknown number of aircraft No infantry deployed	Zadran: 55,000 (Full size of the Zadran tribe, 6000 armed); Safi: 12,000

Casualties and losses
(Kingdom of Afghanistan) More than 4,000 (British Raj) None	Hundreds of Safi killed ~500 Safi families displaced

The Afghan tribal revolts of 1944–1947 or the Khost disturbances were a series of tribal revolts in the Kingdom of Afghanistan by Zadran, Safi and Mangal tribesmen which lasted from February 1944 to January 1947. The causes of the revolts lay in the worsening conditions of farmers, changes in conscription laws, the elimination of the power of Safi tribal leaders, Amanullah loyalism, trading monopolies, government surveillance, taxation, and poverty. The conflict began when government forces clashed with the forces of a tribal leader named Mazrak, who led the Zadran tribe in revolt. The Zadran uprising was followed by additional uprisings by the Safi and Mangal, the former of which elected their own king, Salemai. Faqir of Ipi, a tribal leader from Waziristan (then part of British India), also fought for the restoration of former king Amanullah Khan alongside other rebels.

The Afghan government deployed Hawker Hind aircraft against the rebels, using aircraft to drop leaflets, gun down tribesmen and drop incendiary bombs. Mazrak invaded the British Raj in late 1944, though he was ultimately forced back into Afghanistan due to British aerial bombardment. Over the course of his uprising, Mazrak was joined by other rebel leaders, such as Sultan Ahmad and Abdurrahman (nicknamed "Pak"). Concurrently, Mohammed Daoud Khan fought against the Safi in the Eastern Province. The Mangal tribe rose up in June 1945. Gerald Crichton, the British Charge de 'affairs in Kabul, described the loyalist victory at Kunar Khas in September 1945 as the "turning point" of the tribal revolts, with most rebels surrendering in late October, though a minority of rebels rejected the agreement and continued fighting into 1946. Mazrak surrendered on 11 January 1947, ending the revolts.

Daoud's military victories against the rebels contributed to his rise to power, leading to his later assumption of the office of prime minister, and eventually the 1973 Afghan coup d'état.

== Background ==
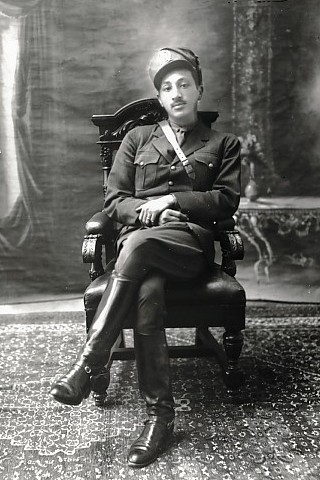
Mohammad Zahir Shah was king during the tribal revolts of 1944–1947.

According to Alexander Davydov, causes of the revolts lay in the worsening conditions of farmers. Farmers and landlords were required to forfeit one-third of their harvest to the government, a practice referred to as sekoti. They would then have to transport the harvests to government warehouses in Bar Kunar (Asmar) and Kuz Kanar (Khewa) districts. At the time, this could only be achieved with animal-powered transport. It was very commonplace for officials to delay acceptance of the deposit and question the quality of their produce. In order to be relieved from dues, farmers and landlords would often have to pay bribes. Despite this, the government of the Republic of Afghanistan (1973–1978) would, decades after the revolts, claim that the peasantry supported the Afghan government and that Safi tribes looted the peasant's homes and businesses in retaliation.

According to David B. Edwards, the causes behind the Safi revolt lay in the change in Safi conscription laws. For many years prior to the uprising, the accepted procedure for enlisting military recruits - known as the qaumi, or "tribal" method - had been for individual tribes to supply a certain number of men of their own choosing; these men would always serve together and generally in locations that were not far removed from their homes. Several years prior to the uprising, however, the government had insisted on employing a system referred to as nufus, or "population", in which the army conscripted its recruits directly from the population without consultation with any tribal body. The previous system was beneficial to the tribe, especially the tribal elders, who decided who would serve. The new procedure eliminated the power of Safi tribal leaders, and was thus fiercely resisted.

One of the rebel leaders, Mazrak, supported the restoration of Amanullah Khan, a king of Afghanistan who was deposed in the Afghan Civil War (1928–1929).

According to British records, the Safi uprising was caused by the Afghan government's attempts to institute conscription among the Safi, trading monopolies granted to Afghan merchant companies, and government surveillance. Whit Mason attributes the Safi uprising to "extremely brutal taxation, oppression and poverty".

== Conflict ==
=== Operations in the Southern Province against Mazrak ===
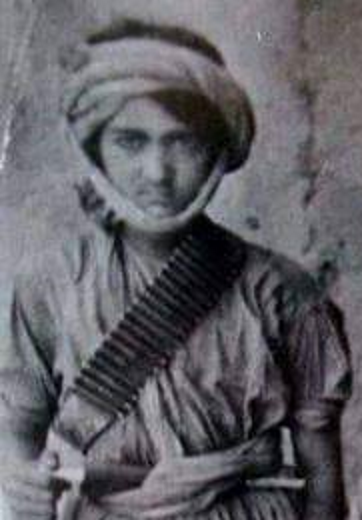
The initial uprising against the government in February 1944 was led by Mazrak Zadran.

The operations which would be officially dubbed the Operations in the Southern Province against Mazrak began in February 1944. There are multiple accounts as to how this conflict began. According to British records, it began shortly after the Afghan government moved troops into the southern province to reassert their authority in the area, which by then was a safe haven for smugglers. En route, the government force was attacked by a Zadian tribal leader named Mazrak. According to a later Pakistani inquiry, the conflict began after the Afghan government raided Mazrak's summer homes at the Taragharai hills and his winter home at Almara, since Mazrak was suspected of housing Amanullah loyalist elements. For the following 3 months, Mazrak would carry out small raids from his new headquarters in Surkot. Government troops attempted to take Mount Almar in March 1944, but failed.

Mazrak was forced to retreat into the hills following an attack by the Afghan government on 22 April 1944. On 19 April, leaflets were dropped on rebels in the Zarok area. On 25 April, the Afghan government dispatched 6 Hawker Hind aircraft to Gardez to deal with the uprising, which returned on 21 June. During that operation, the Hind aircraft were focused on dropping leaflets and incendiary bombs. No large explosives were dropped, but there were several instances of hostile tribesmen being gunned down by the aircraft. 2-3 villages were said to have been destroyed by incendiary bombs during this time. On request of the Afghan government, the British Raj took precautions to prevent Waziri tribesmen from aiding Mazrak.

During the period of 1 August to 31 October 1944, no major Afghan aerial operations against Mazrak were undertaken, other than reconnaissance flights. Around this time, Mazrak was subject to heavy bombardment in British territory, where he was sheltered by local tribesmen, after which he retreated back to Afghan territory. During his brief stay in the British Raj, Mazrak was joined by Sultan Ahmed, a rebel chieftain from Balochistan. They were later joined by another rebel leader nicknamed Pak.

In November 1944, the appearance of a mysterious Malang who posed as the brother of Amanullah temporarily helped boost Mazrak's fortunes, but lack of money with which to bribe the tribes caused the failure of the movement, and Malang had disappeared into obscurity by March 1945. By this time, the situation of the Afghan government was the most critical since the Ghilzai rebellion of 1938 - their aerial capacity was limited by a shortage in bombs, their resources were stretched between the southern and eastern provinces, and the general population was discontented by high prices and a shortage of commodities. Further aerial operations against Mazrak, which included reconnaissance and bombing runs, took place in the Kunar valley from 24 June to 31 October 1945. Sultan Ahmad surrendered in November 1946, and was returned to Balochistan in custody. Despite Ahmad's surrender, Mazrak continued to fight. Ultimately, Mazrak and his brother Sher Muhd Khan surrendered to the Afghan government, on 11 January 1947.

=== Safi uprising ===
The Safi rose up in either 1944 or 1945. It started when an order to arrest the Safi leaders - Sultan Mohammad, Abdul Qadir, Mir Salam and Momoond Khan, came to the notice of Mir Salam who informed the other leaders and managed to incite a general uprising at Davagal and Badil among others. The conflict began when Safi rebels ambushed and captured government troops intended to gather conscripts. On 24 June 1945, 4 aircraft were dispatched to Jalalabad to deal with the Safi. Bombs and incendiaries caused extensive damage to Safi villages. One aircraft with 3 bombs, 1 vickers machine gun and 1 Lewis gun was lost during operations against the Safis. Among the villages bombed were the villages of Pacheyano Banda and Tanar. In one of the bombardments of the latter village, 11 members of a family were killed and the rest of the family members were unable to bury the dead in the village graveyard due to the threat of further bombardment. Instead they buried the dead in front of the family home, where they remained as of 2011. During this rebellion, it was rumoured among the Safi that the government intended to ship women off to Kabul to become prostitutes. Among the more enthusiastic rebel fighters were younger men with more to gain and less to lose from fighting the government. The Safi elected a monarch of their own, named Salemai, as well as a Prime Minister (Amanat Lewana) and a Minister of Defence (Amanul Mulk).

Some contemporary British records reported that the three Bādshāh Guls (i.e. grandsons of the Akhund of Swat) were active in support of the Kabul government while the Gul Şāḥib of Babra was secretly urging his followers in Chaharmung and Bajaur to support the Safis. However, further evidence of this has not been found.

The Afghan government armed Nuristani and Shinwari tribesmen to fight the Safi.

At one point in the rebellion, Safi rebels looted the government treasury in Chagha Serai. Starting in late August 1945, 1,500-2,000 Safi rebels besieged a 400-men strong government garrison at Kunar Khas. This siege lasted several weeks, (Note: A report by Alexander Lancaster, the British Military Attaché at Kabul states 14 days, whereas Giles Frederick Squire, British Envoy to Afghanistan, states it lasted 17 days.) with the Safi being unable to capture Kunar Khas due to the Afghan air force supplying the settlement with food and ammunition. Had the Safi been able to capture Kunar Khas, that may have resulted in the collapse of government control in the eastern province. Gerald Crichton, the British Charge de 'affairs in Kabul, described the loyalist victory at Kunar Khas in September 1945 as the "turning point" of the tribal revolts. By the end of October, most of the Safis, except for a few die-hards had come to terms with the Afghan government. This peace agreement included among other things the abandonment or postponement of Safi conscription. Aerial operations against the Safis in the Kunar valley ended in early November. In either 1945 or 1946, the Safi leaders, Shahswar, Said Muhd, Salim Khan and Allahdadd Khan fled to Mohmand tribal territory in the British Raj.

An oral account from 1983 described the revolt as follows:

I think the Safi War [safi jang] was in 1945. It continued for a year and stopped in the winter of 1946. The government secretly planted some paid spies among the people. Approximately five hundred families were exiled after the war. I remember. They brought lorries. I was still small, and I was very happy that I would see a new world. The adult men and some of the women were crying. This exile suddenly came upon our family. I was just small, and I heard that my father had come. He had been in prison along with my uncle. Just one of my uncles was at home. One of my brothers was at the military high school. People arrived - all of a sudden. We heard. One or two people said, "Look!" They were all wearing normal country clothes - not uniforms. I thought that people were coming, and it was announced that my father had been released from prison. My father would be back home with us the next day. I was happy. [It was as though] the Jeshen (Independence Day) celebrations had begun. I was very happy. They were all armed, and as soon as they had come, they suddenly captured my family. Two or three hundred people, all dressed in civilian clothes, all are with the government, they captured us and said, "In the morning, you will be leaving."

On 23 November 1946, Mohammed Dauod Khan gave the remaining Safi peace terms, which included the return of rifles and small arms ammunition captured from government troops, the surrender of Shahswar, Said Muhd, Salim Khan and Allahdadd Khan, the sale of grain to the government at reasonable rates, and the despatch of Safi youths to Kabul for education. According to Ben Acheson, the Safi accepted the terms that same month.

The events of this uprising are known as the Year of the Safi (Safi kal).

==== Duration ====
The Safi uprising has received very little attention from scholars and researchers. Among the few texts that do discuss the revolt, there is disagreement about when it started and ended. The following table summarizes different information provided by various texts.

Start date	End date	Work	Author(s)	Ref
1944	1945	Rebuilding Afghanistan's National Army (Journal of the US Army War College)	Ali Jalali	
1944	1946	Afghanistan: Graveyard of Empires: A New History of the Borderland	David Isby	
1945	1945	Conflict in Afghanistan: A Historical Encyclopedia	Frank Clements; Ludwig Adamec	
1945	Winter 1946 (Duration: 1 year)	Before Taliban: Genealogies of the Afghan Jihad	David B. Edwards	
1945	1946	Islam and Politics in Afghanistan	Asta Olesen	
1945	1946	Wanat : Combat Action In Afghanistan, 2008	Combat Studies Institute	
1945	6 months after start	The Rule of Law in Afghanistan: Missing in Inaction	Whit Mason	
1946	1946	Revolutions & Rebellions in Afghanistan	Unknown	
?	Between February and May 1946	British Documents on Foreign Affairs: Reports and Papers from the Foreign Office Confidential Print: Afghanistan, Persia, Turkey and Iraq, 1952	Paul Preston; Michael Partridge	

=== Mangal uprising ===
The Mangal tribe rose up in Gardez in June 1945.

=== Role of aircraft ===
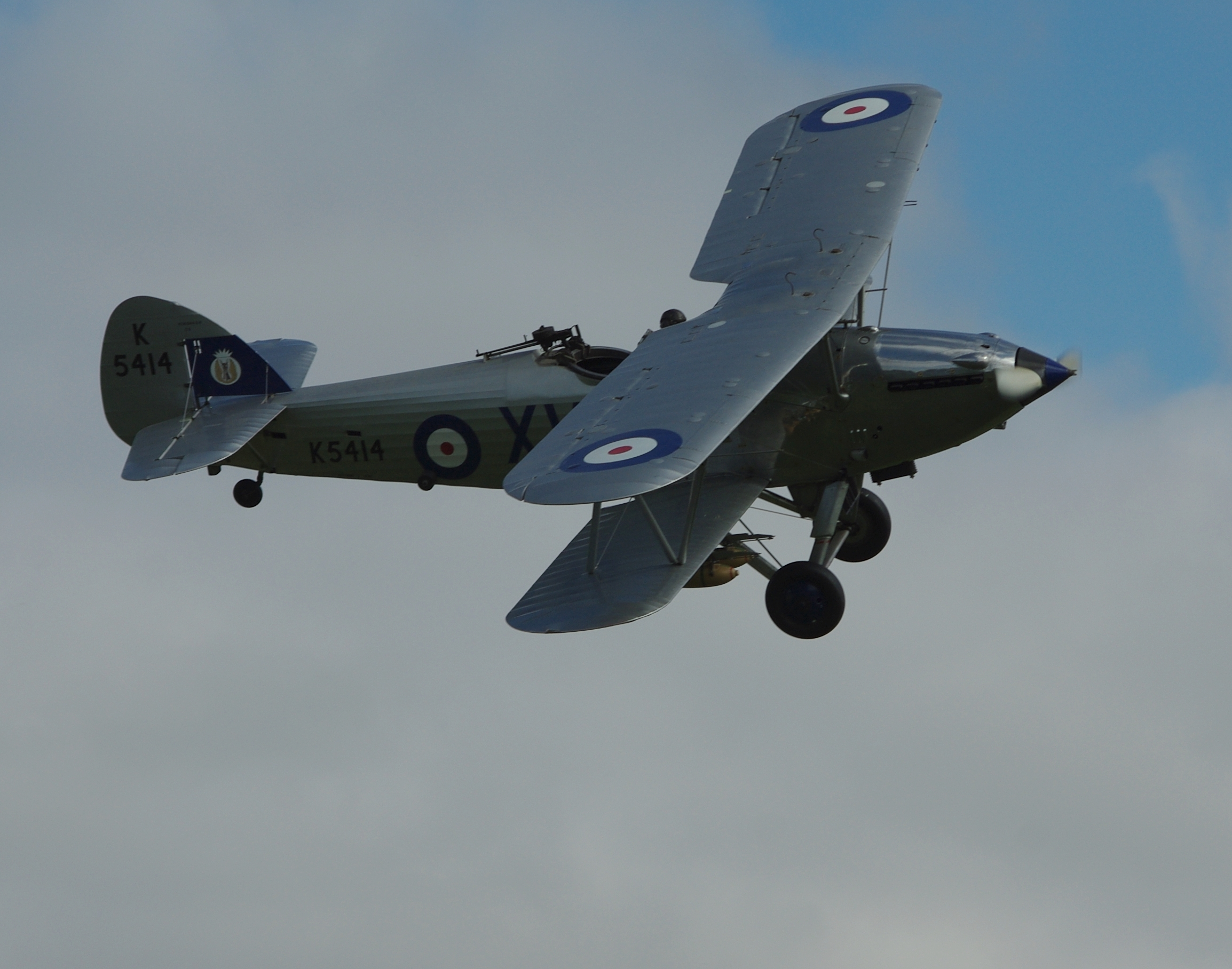
Afghan Hawker Hind aircraft.

Afghanistan had obtained Hawker Hind aircraft from Britain, purchasing 8 aircraft in 1937 and an additional 20 in 1939. During the tribal revolts of 1944–1947, these would come in use as the Afghan government used aircraft to drop leaflets, gun down tribesmen and drop incendiary bombs.

It was rumoured that on one occasion, Afghan aircraft accidentally bombed and machine gunned government troops or allied tribal levies, causing 40 casualties. There were also a few minor accidents at the Jalalabad airfield, but the aircraft did not incur serious damage. Two aerial officers, Muhd Anwar Khan (pilot) and Abdul Vaqil Khan (observer) were killed in the operations, while another aerial officer, a pilot, fell into the hands of the rebels in the Mazar or Pech Daras, where he was knifed in the back and had his throat cut, but survived after local villagers found him laying unconscious near his aircraft and tended to his wounds.

An incomplete list of aerial reconnaissance operations of note is listed below.

Start date	End date	Duration (in days)	Destination	Aircraft involved	Notes	Ref
1944-06-05	1944-06-06	2	Khost	1		
1944-07-02	1944-07-02	0.083 (2 hours)	Khost	3		
1944-07-17	1944-07-17	0.083 (2 hours)	Khost	9		
1945-04-15	1945-04-17	3	Matun	1		
1945-05-08	1945-05-08	1	Matun	1		
1945-10-03	1945-10-04	2	Matun	1		
1945-10-07	1945-10-07	1	Matun	1		
1945-10-09	1945-10-09	1	Matun	1		
1945-10-13	1945-10-15	3	Matun	3	2 aircraft returned on 14 October, the last returned on 15 October.	

=== Leading figures ===
==== Afghan government ====
- Mohammed Zahir Shah (15 October 1914 – 23 July 2007) was the king of Afghanistan during the revolts.
- Mohammed Daoud Khan (18 July 1909 – 28 April 1978) was commander of the central forces during the revolts. He led Afghan forces against the Safi.
- Mohammad Hashim Khan (1884 – 26 October 1953) was prime minister of Afghanistan during the revolts, until 9 May 1946.
- Shah Mahmud Khan (1890 – 27 December 1959) was prime minister of Afghanistan during the revolts, from 9 May 1946.

==== British Empire ====
- Archibald Wavell (5 May 1883 – 24 May 1950) was Viceroy and Governor-General of India during this conflict.

==== Zadran tribe ====
- Mazrak Khan Zadran (fl. 1900s – 1972) was the tribal chief of the Zadran tribe, which he led in revolt from February 1944 until his surrender on 11 January 1947.
- Sher Muhd Khan (fl. 1925 – 1947) was one Mazrak Zadran's brothers. He surrendered alongside Mazrak on 11 January 1947.
- Said Akbar Babrak (b. 1921 or 1922 – d. 16 October 1951) was another of Mazrak Zadran's brothers. He was a minor leader in this rebellion.
- Sultan Ahmad (fl. 1944 – 1945) was a Balochi chieftain who joined Mazrak. He surrendered in November 1945, and was returned to Balochistan in custody.
- Abdurrahman (nickname Pak, fl. 1945) was a rebel leader who joined Mazrak. British records describe him as a "hardy perennial" and state that he had "inevitably" joined Mazrak.
- British records mention a "mysterious Malang" who posed as the brother of Amanullah and temporarily helped boost Mazrak's fortunes. A lack of money with which to bribe the tribes was stated to have caused the failure of the movement, and Malang had disappeared into obscurity by March 1945.

==== Safi tribe ====
- Salemai (fl. 1940s) was the Safi king.
- Amanat Lewana (fl. 1940s) was the Safi prime minister.
- Amanul Mulk (died c. 2011) was the Safi minister of defence.
- Shahswar (fl. 1940s) was the Safi minister.
- Mir Azam Khan (fl. 1940s) was one of the leaders of the Safi revolt.
- Sultan Mohammad (fl. 1940s) was one of leaders of the revolt. According to the account of the University of Peshawar, he was one of the leaders who began the uprising after being informed of his impending arrest. However, according to David B Edwards, he was initially neutral and only joined after Mohammed Daoud Khan insulted him in a personal meeting. He was captured by Afghan forces and was sentenced to death, but Zahir Shah gave him clemency. David B Edwards dedicated significant parts of Before Taliban: Genealogies of the Afghan Jihad and Heroes of the Age: Moral Fault Lines on the Afghan Frontier to covering Sultan Mohammad's life, as well as those of his children.
- Abdul Qadir, Mir Salam and Momoond Khan (fl. 1940s) were, according to the account of the University of Peshawar, three rebel leaders who began the uprising after being informed of their impending arrest.
- Said Muhd, Salim Khan and Allahdadd Khan (fl. 1946) were three Safi rebel leaders who had fled to the British Raj by November 1946.

==== Mangal tribe ====
- The leaders of the Mangal uprising are unknown.

==== Other rebel leaders, roles unclear ====
- Faqir Ipi (Ghazi Mirzali Khan Wazir; 1897 – 16 April 1960) was a rebel leader who fought alongside the rebels.
- Ghilzai Malang (fl. 1945) was named by British records as an "outlaw" who was a threat to the Afghan government. It is unclear if he is related to the "mysterious Malang".
- Pak Malang (fl. 1945) was named by British records as an "outlaw" who was a threat to the Afghan government. It is unclear if he is related to Abdurrahman, who was nicknamed Pak.
- Abdur Rahim Khan (b. 1886), an ex-governor of Herat, was arrested in January 1946 for suspected complicity in the Safi revolt, together with his son-in-law, the Persian poet Khalilullah Khalili. He was released in 1948.

== Aftermath ==
With the defeat of the Safi and the surrender of Mazrak in late 1946 and January 1947 respectively, the revolts had come to a close. Hundreds of Safi were killed in the revolts, and following their defeat, the Kunar valley was ethnically cleansed of Safi Pashtuns. Other Safis, around 500 families, were exiled to Herat, Kabul or to Sholgara District.

Veterans of the Afghan army who fought against the Safi were awarded the Royal Medal for the Suppression of the Rebellion in Kunar Province. The silver medal bears an inscription and is dated '١٣٢٤' (AH1324 = AD1945).

The tribal revolts of 1944–1947 influenced Afghanistan to take a pro-Pakistan stance during the Indo-Pakistani War of 1947–1948. A pro-India stance in this case would necessitate stopping Pashtuns from joining Pakistan's war against India, which was expected to cause a resurgence in rebel activity when the government was hoping to focus on national reform.

During the tribal revolts, Mohammad Daoud Khan led Afghan forces against the Safi and thereby came to national attention. Daoud's military victories contributed to his rise to power, leading to his later assumption of the office of prime minister, and eventually the 1973 Afghan coup d'état.

Some sources appear to state that a new conflict between the government and the Safi took place somewhere between 1947 and 1949. These include a mention of a "recrudescence in Safi discontent" in a British report dated 12 December 1947, which covered events from 1 May to 31 October 1947, although this report provides very little information in regards to the scope of the "recrudescence". The New Cambridge History of Islam also mentions a revolt among the Safi lasting from 1947 to 1949. An article by Hafeez R. Khan from 1960, titled "Afghanistan and Pakistan", also briefly mentions a Safi revolt lasting from 1948 to 1949 in a timeline of Afghan history. The Sovietization of Afghanistan also mentions a Safi revolt in December 1947, while placing its defeat as late as 1954. Transition in Afghanistan: Hope, Despair and the Limits of Statebuilding mentions "the putting-down of a Safi Pushtun revolt in 1947" as an aside. Besides the British document, none of these sources mention an earlier revolt in 1945 or 1946. The Cambridge History also states that the Safi were defeated by Mohammed Daoud Khan, implying that Daoud reprised his role in quelling the Safi in a new conflict from 1947 to 1949. However, Conflict in Afghanistan: A Historical Encyclopedia's biography of Daoud only mentions a single Safi revolt in 1945, which he quelled during his office as Commander of the Central Forces, which he held from 1939 to 1947. It should also be noted that it's very common for authors writing about the 1945 Safi revolt to give different start and end dates.
