= Babrak Khan =

Afghan chieftain (died 1924)

- ببرک خان ځدراڼ
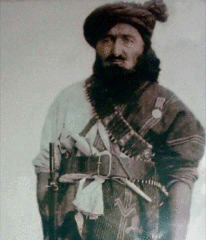

Tribal chief of the Zadran tribe
- In office unknown – October 1924
- Preceded by: unknown
- Succeeded by: Mazrak Zadran

Personal details
- Born: Almara
- Died: October 1924 Bak, Southern Province, Emirate of Afghanistan
- Children: Mazrak Zadran; Sher Muhd Khan; Said Akbar Babrak; Izmair; 5 or 14 others
- Parent: Mazar Khan (father)
- Siblings: Khan Muhammad
- Tribe: Zadran

Military service
- Allegiance: Emirate of Afghanistan
- Battles/wars: Khost rebellion (1912); Third Anglo-Afghan War; Khost rebellion (1924–1925) †

Babrak Khan (Note: Pashto: ببرک خان ځدراڼ) (died October 1924) was an Afghan chieftain of the Zadran tribe of Pashtuns. He was the father of Sayyid Akbar Babrak (assassin of the first Prime Minister of Pakistan, Liaqat Ali Khan) and of Mazrak Zadran (a rebel leader during the Afghan tribal revolts of 1944–1947).

He died fighting rebels during the Khost rebellion (1924–1925).

== Biography ==
=== Early life ===
Babrak Khan born in Almara. He was the son of Mazar Khan (Pashto: مزرک خان). Babrak spent most of his early life in poverty.

=== Chieftain ===
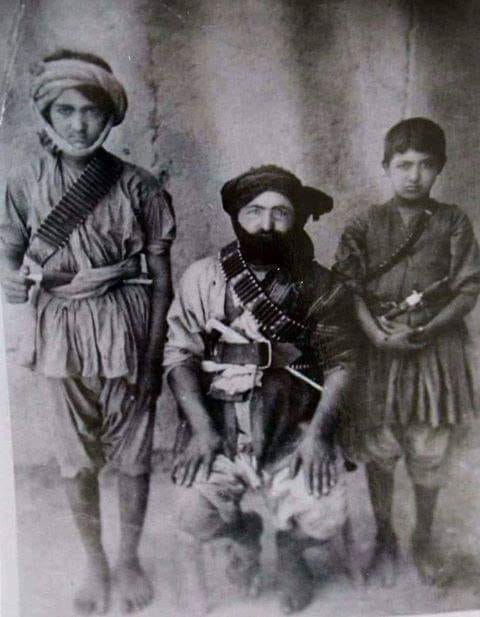
Babrak Khan with 2 of his children

In 1898, Babrak had under him five companies of Zadran Khasadars, whom he maintained on a contract system with emir Abdur Rahman Khan, but these were subsequently disbanded and their place taken by regular troops. According to Ludwig Adamec, he took part in quelling the Khost rebellion of 1912, even though the Zadran tribe (which he was supposedly chief of) was fighting against the Afghan government, according to the Britannica Year book 1913. Zadrans burnt his tower in 1913. In 1917, he headed a deputation of leading Zadran Maliks which visited the Nazim of Khost with a view to making peace with the British. He also tried to restrain Zadrans from troubling the Tochi border. In March 1919, Babrak left for Kabul with Sayyid Musa Shah Mandozai to offer allegiance to Amanullah Khan. In May, he despatched messengers to Miranshah and Sherani to summon Maliks. During the Third Anglo-Afghan War, he accompanied the Afghan Army as far as Matun and was said to have participated in Nadir Khan's attack on Thal. For his efforts in the war, he was promoted to honorary Brigadier and Naib Salar.

=== Death and succession ===
In the context of the Khost rebellion, on 22 October 1924, it was reported that Babrak Khan had "recently" died fighting rebels at the village of Bak. He was succeeded as chieftain by his son, Mazrak.

== Family ==
Mazar Khan fl. late 19th century
Babrak Khan d. October 1924	Khan Muhammad
Mazrak Zadran fl. 1900s – 1972	Sayyid Akbar Babrak b. 1921 or 1922 d. 16 Oct 1951	Sher Muhd Khan fl. 1924 – 1947	Izmair fl. 1924 – 1945	5 or 14 others (Note: Sources disagree how many sons Babrak had - Jamna Das Akhtar states that Babrak had 18 sons, while a Pakistani government inquiry titled The Assassination of Mr. Liaquat Ali Khan states that Babrak had 9 sons. David B. Edwards states that Babrak had 2 sons, but this appears to be false, as at least 4 of his son's names are known.)
Dilawar Khan b. 1939 or 1940	Muhammad Umar Babrakzai (Note: Muhammad Umar Babrakzai was Babrak Khan's grandchild although it's unclear through what father.) fl. 1980
