= Datakhel =

Town in Khyber Pakhtunkhwa, Pakistan

Datakhel دته خېل
- Town
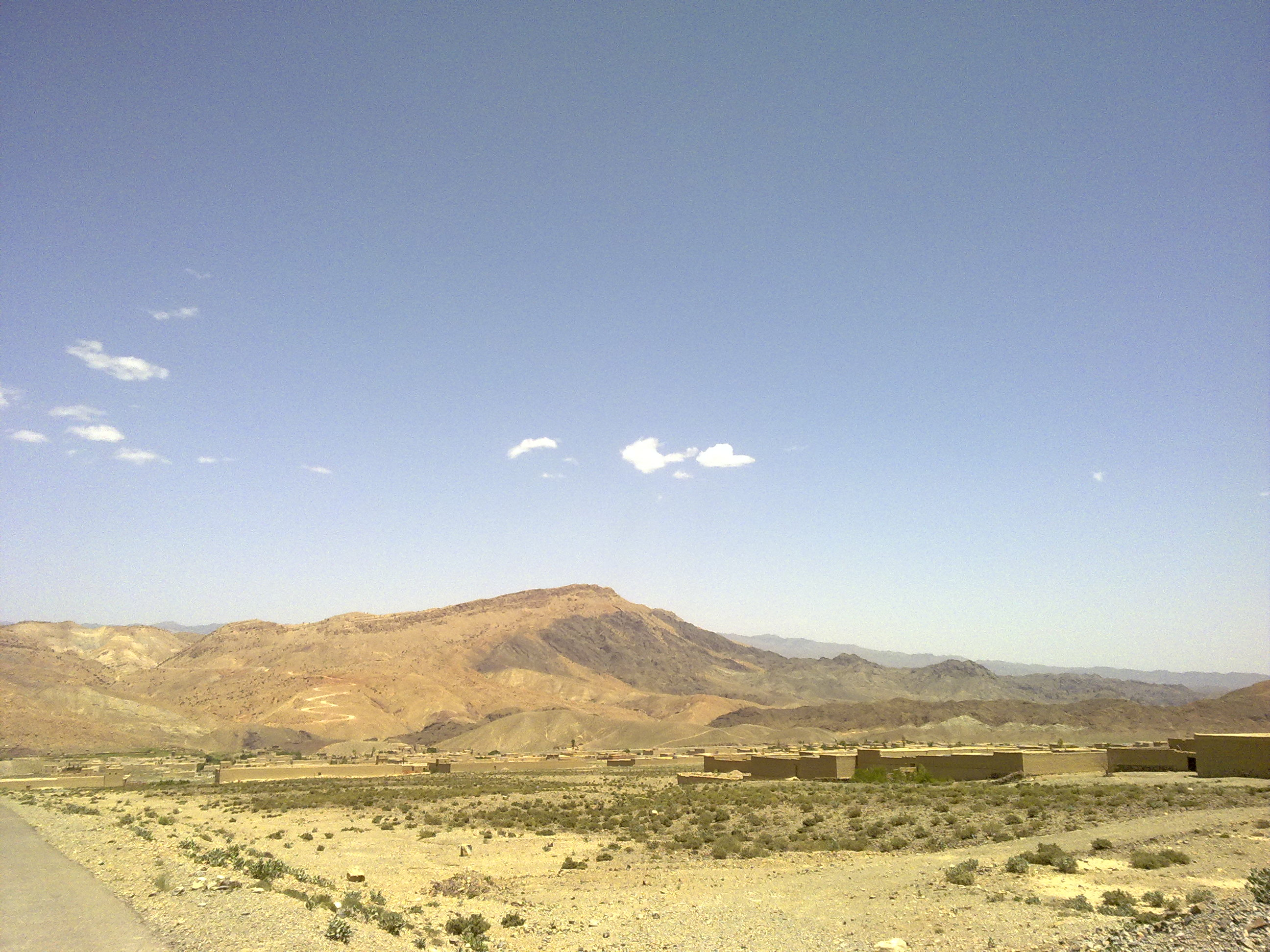
- Interactive map of Datakhel
- Coordinates: 32°54′18.4″N 69°44′56″E
- Country: Pakistan
- Province: Federally Administered Tribal Areas
- District: North Waziristan
- Tehsil: Datta Khel
- Elevation: 2,010 m (6,590 ft)

Population (2017)
  - Total: 1,037
- Time zone: UTC+5 (PST)

Datakhel (Pashto: دته خېل) or Datta Khel is a town in the North Waziristan District of Khyber Pakhtunkhwa, Pakistan.

It is part of Datta Khel Tehsil of North Waziristan district.

== Overview and history ==
Datakhel is located around 41 km South West of near by towns of Miran Shan and 21 km of Boya in North Wizaristan. According to the 2017 census, the population of Datakhel, is 1037 with total number of household stands at 171.

On January 11, 1947, Datakhel was the site of the conclusion of the Afghan tribal revolts of 1944–1947; see Surrender at Datta Khel.

On Sept 25, 2008, as an indication of escalating tensions between nations, Pakistani forces fired warning shots at American aircraft after they crossed into Pakistan's territory in the area of Saidgai, in North Waziristan's Datakhel region.

On March 17, 2011, a US airstrike that killed 44 people in the city led to widespread condemnation in Pakistan.

On May 17, 2011, Datakhel was the site of a skirmish between the US and Pakistan.

== See also ==
- North Waziristan
- Khyber Pakhtunkhwa
