= Safi (tribe) =

Tribe in Afghanistan

Sāpī (Pashto: ساپی Sāpai; plur. ساپي Sāpī) is a Pashtun tribe situated mostly in Afghanistan. A portion of the Pashayi have also adopted the label.

According to a work published by Jeffrey H.P Evans-von Krbek at the Department of Anthropology at the University of Durham in 1977, the origins of the Sapi lies in the region of ancient Gandhara.

The exact population number of this clan is not known; however, it is estimated to be around 2.5 million in Afghanistan. Sapis have played an important role in Afghanistan. The Sapi tribe is well known for its resistance to the Taliban regime, and many fierce clashes have broken out between the two.

== People ==
- Amanul Mulk, leader of the tribal revolts under rebel King Salemai
- Amanat Lewana, rebel Prime Minister of Afghanistan's Eastern Provinces
- Jamil al-Rahman, Afghan Salafist and Amir of the Islamic Emirate of Kunar
- Amanullah Sailaab Sapi, Afghan poet and writer
- Turabaz Khan, Royal Afghan Army General and served as Kabul's Police Commander
- Mohammed Asif Safi, Afghan army serviceman during the Monarchy and Republic
