= Bäk, Khost Province =

Settlement in Khost Province, Afghanistan

Bäk
- Location in Afghanistan
- Coordinates: 33°30′N 70°3′E
- Country: Afghanistan
- Province: Khost Province
- District: Bak District
- Elevation: 3,730 ft (1,137 m)
- Time zone: UTC+4:30

Bäk (Pashto: بک) is a village in Khost Province, Afghanistan and the center of the boundary Bak District, close to the border with Pakistan. It is located on 33.5°N 70.05°E at 1137 m altitude.

It was the scene of fighting during the Khost rebellion (1924–1925). On 22 October 1924, it was reported that Babrak Khan, a loyalist tribal leader, had "recently" died fighting rebels in this village.

== See also ==
- Khost Province
