= Datta Khel Tehsil =

Administrative subdivision in Khyber Pakhtunkhwa, Pakistan

Datta Khel Tehsil تحصیل دتا خيل دته خېل تحصیل
- Tehsil
- Country: Pakistan
- Region: Khyber Pakhtunkhwa
- District: North Waziristan
- Seat: Datta Khel

Population (2017)
  - Total: 75,116
- Time zone: UTC+5 (PST)

Datta Khel Tehsil is a subdivision located in North Waziristan District, Khyber Pakhtunkhwa, Pakistan. The population is 75,116 according to the 2017 census.

== See also ==
- List of tehsils of Khyber Pakhtunkhwa
