= Bak District =

District in Afghanistan

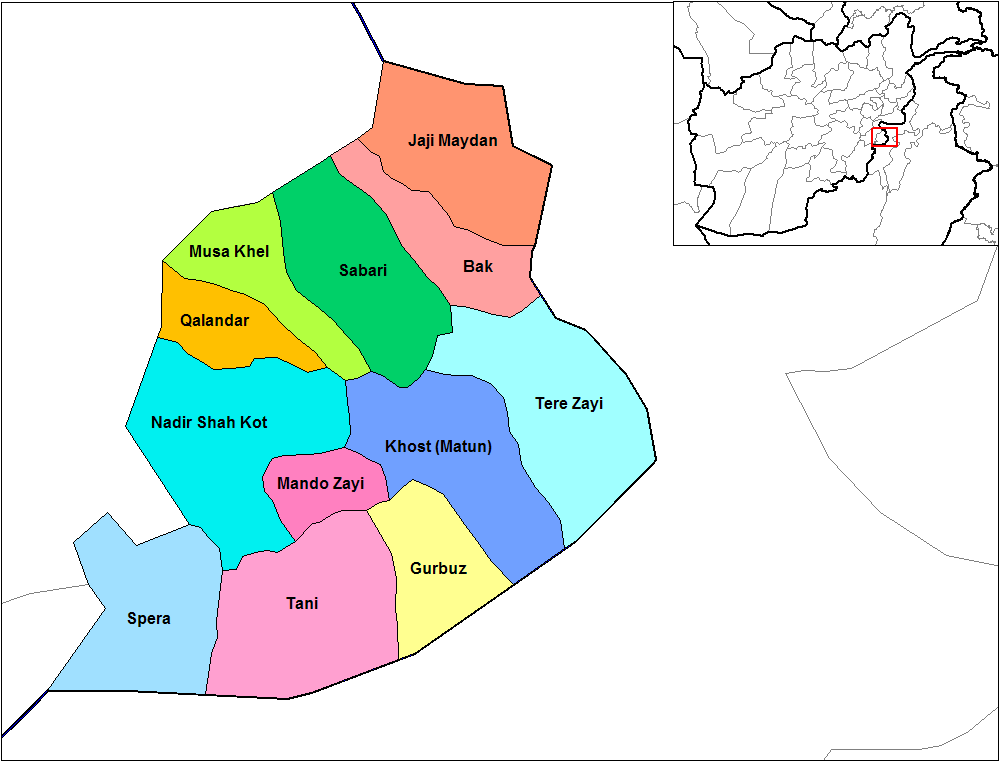
Bak District shown in pinkish in the north, below Zazi Maidan District.

Bäk District (Pashto: باک ولسوالۍ) is in the northern part of Khost Province, Afghanistan. It borders Tere Zayi District to the south, Sabari District to the west, Zazi Maydan District to the north, and Khyber Pakhtunkhwa in Pakistan to the east. According to Afghanistan's National Statistics and Information Authority (NSIA) the 2020 estimated population of the district was 24,977 people. The district center is the village of Bäk, in the southern part near the border with Tere Zayi District.

== See also ==
- Districts of Afghanistan
