= Datta Khel incident =

2011 armed skirmish between American and Pakistani forces in Khyber Pakhtunkhwa, Pakistan

- Part of the Pakistan-United States skirmishes
Date	17 May 2011
Location	Afghanistan-Pakistan border

Belligerents
United States ▪︎United States Army	Pakistan ▪︎Pakistan Army

Strength
Two attack helicopters	Pakistani troops (unknown number); Two attack helicopters

Casualties and losses
Possible aircraft damage	None

The Datta Khel incident was a skirmish that took place between a United States helicopter and Pakistani forces took place in the Datta Khel area on May 17, 2011. According to NATO, an American encampment along the Afghanistan-Pakistan border took direct and indirect fire from Pakistan. Two United States helicopters flew into the area. According to the Pakistani military, the helicopters had breached its airspace. Pakistani forces fired at a helicopter twice, and the helicopter returned fire, injuring two soldiers. Pakistan reportedly deployed two attack helicopters, which arrived after the U.S. helicopters had left.
