= Turabaz Khan =

Afghan general, provincial governor, and security chief

Turabaz Khan طره باز خان
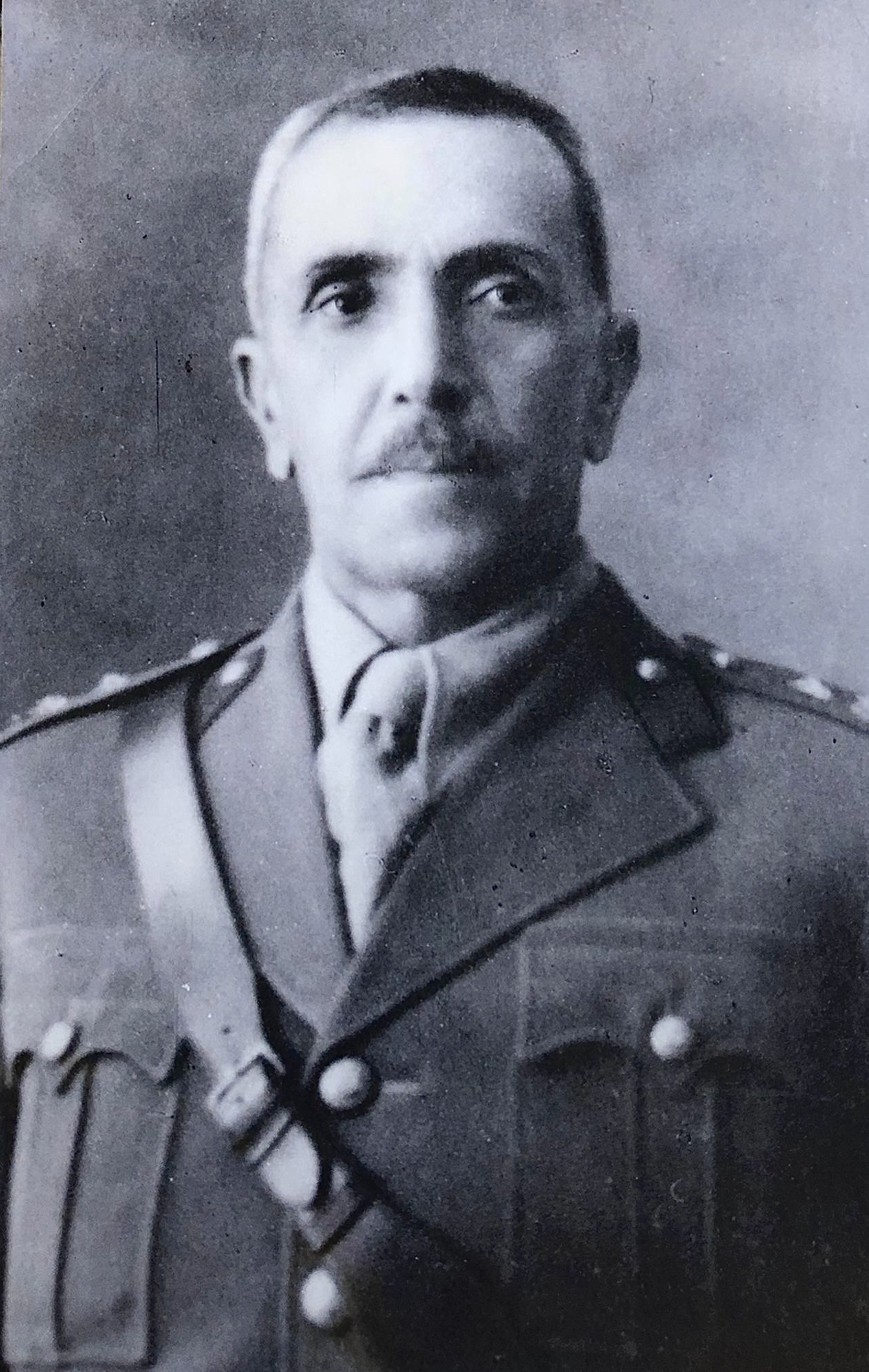
- General Turabaz Khan during his tenure as Chief of Security at the Ministry of Interior, Kabul.
- Monarchs: Amanullah Khan; Mohammad Nadir Shah; Mohammed Zahir Shah

Chief of Security, Ministry of Interior
- In office 1942–1953

Hakim-i-Ala (Governor) of the Eastern Province
- In office 1939–1939

Qūmāndān-e Kōtwālī (Commander of Police), Kabul
- In office 1931–1939

Sarhaddar (Military Governor) of Dakka
- In office 1924–1930

Commander of the Afridi Battalion
- In office 1922–1922

Personal details
- Born: 1885 Tagab, Emirate of Afghanistan
- Died: 1982 (aged 96–97) Kabul, Democratic Republic of Afghanistan
- Education: Madrasse-ye Ḥarbi-ye Sirājiyah (Royal Military College)
- Occupation: Military officer, government official

Military service
- Allegiance: Emirate of Afghanistan; Kingdom of Afghanistan
- Branch/service: Royal Afghan Army
- Years of service: c. 1909–1953
- Rank: Firqa Mishar

Turabaz Khan (Pashto: طره بازخان; 1885–1982) was an Afghan military officer and government official. A member of a Safi tribal family from Tagab, he served in the Afghan Army and held senior police, security, and provincial administrative posts during the reigns of King Amanullah Khan, King Mohammad Nadir Shah, and King Mohammad Zahir Shah. His appointments included commander of the Afridi Battalion, Sarhaddar (military governor) of Dakka, Commander of Police of Kabul, Chief of Security at the Ministry of Interior, and Hakim-i-Ala (provincial governor) of the Eastern Province.

== Career ==
=== Military education ===
Turabaz Khan was educated at the Madrasse-ye Ḥarbi-ye Sirājiyah (Royal Military College) in Kabul.

=== Service and appointments ===
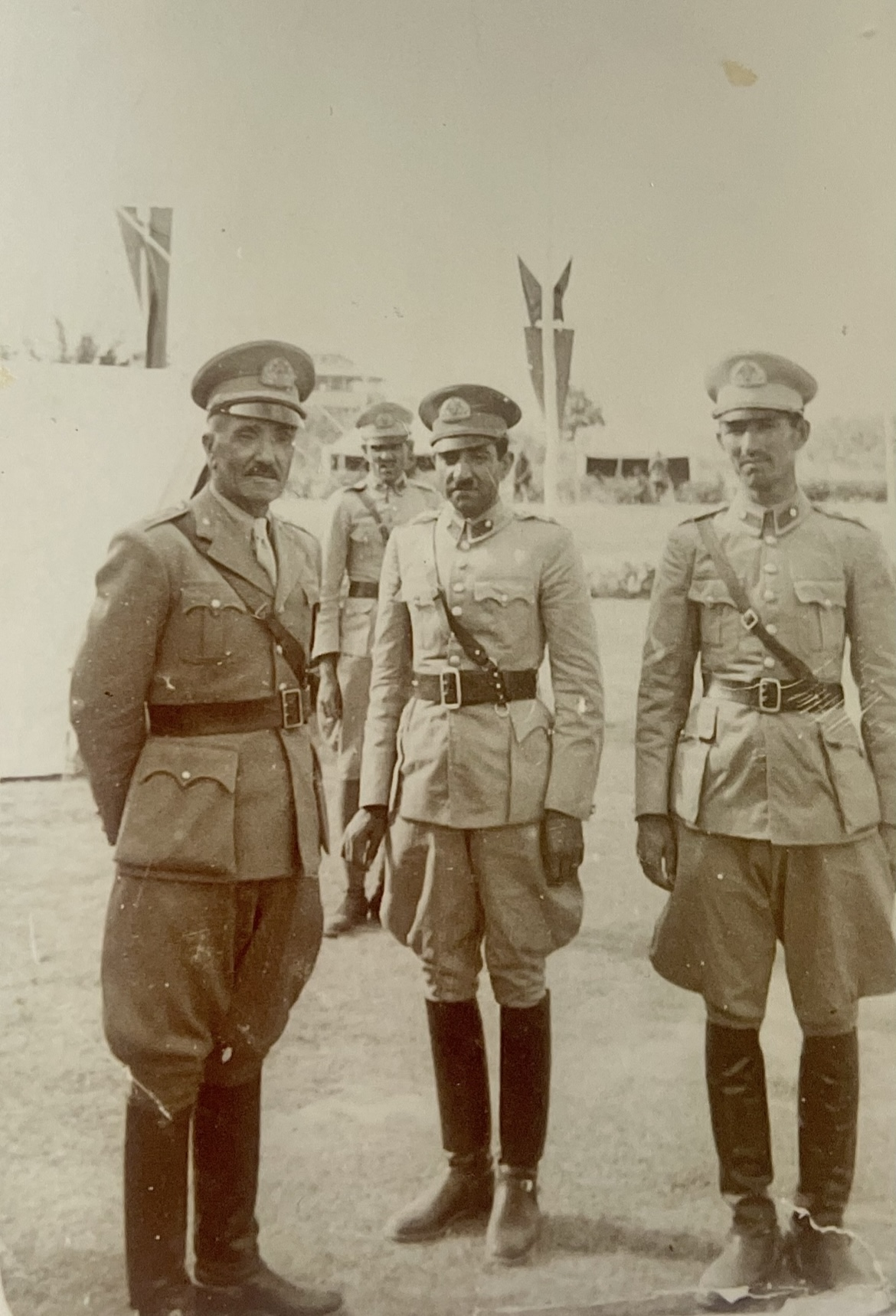
General Turabaz Khan (left) during a formal military parade, c. late 1940s–early 1950s.

In 1922, Turabaz Khan was appointed commander of the Afridi Battalion. From 1924 to 1930, he served as Sarhaddar (military governor) of Dakka.

In 1931, he was appointed Qūmāndān-e Kōtwālī (Commander of Police) of Kabul. British diplomatic reports from the same year indicate that he was promoted to the rank of Ghund Mishar (brigadier) and served, at least initially, in an acting capacity following the reassignment of Abdul Jamil Khan. The Salnama-ye Kabul (Kabul Yearbook) of 1937–1938 explicitly records him holding this position.

He retained this position until his appointment as Hakim-i-Ala (provincial governor) of the Eastern Province in 1939.

He later attained the higher rank of Firqa Mishar (major general). In 1942, he was appointed Chief of Security at the Ministry of Interior.

== Personal life ==
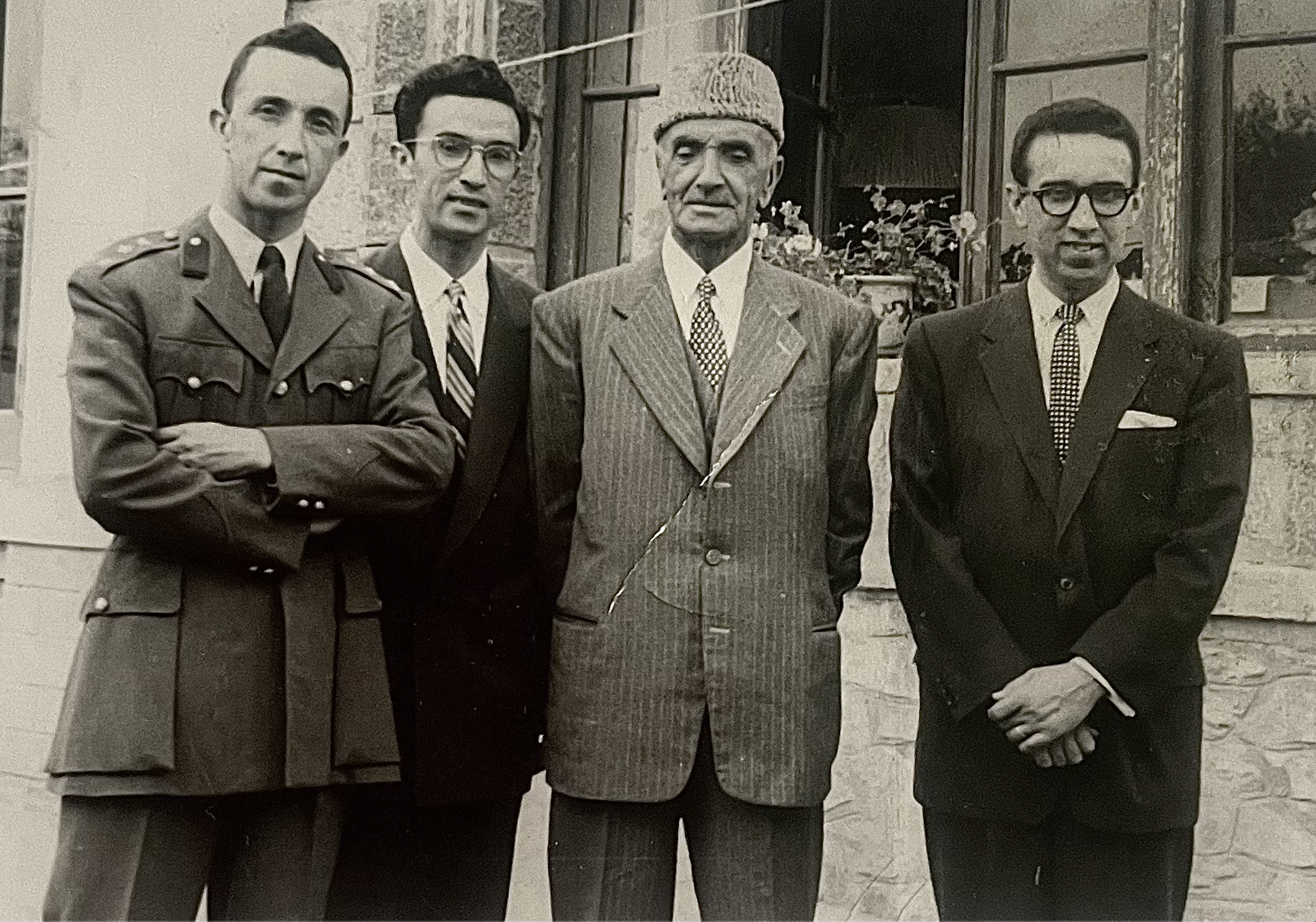
General Turabaz Khan (centre) with his sons, from left to right: General Ghulam Siddiq Turabaz, Ghulam Sakhi Turabaz, and Ghulam Farouk Turabaz.

Turabaz Khan was married and had four children.

- Ghulam Sachi Turabaz served as Director of the Jabal al-Saraj Cement Factory and later as President of the Administrative Department at the Ministry of Mines and Industries.
- Ghulam Farouk Turabaz served as Chargé d’Affaires at the Afghan Embassy in the United States in 1978.
- Ghulam Siddiq Turabaz served as an army general and was appointed a member of the first Loya Jirga of the Republic of Afghanistan in 1973.
- Siddiqa Turabaz married Fazl Mohammad Khairzada, former Vice-President of Bank-i-Milli Afghanistan.

Turabaz Khan died in 1982 in Kabul. A crossroads near his residence, Char-Rahi Turabaz Khan (چهارراهی طره باز خان), is named after him.
