= Sayd Akbar =

Assassin of Liaquat Ali Khan (1921/1922–1951)

- سید اکبر
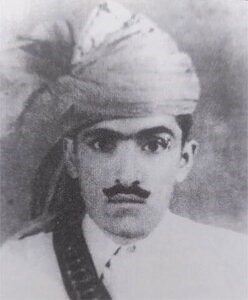
- The only surviving photo of Sayd Akbar, released by the government of Pakistan in the 1950s
- Born: 1921 or 1922; Khost, Southern Province, Emirate of Afghanistan
- Died: 16 October 1951 (aged 29); Rawalpindi, West Punjab, Dominion of Pakistan
- Cause of death: Gunshot
- Known for: Carrying out the assassination of Liaquat Ali Khan
- Spouse: Musammat Malmal Bibi (c. 1940s)
- Children: 2
- Parent: Babrak Khan (father)
- Status: Executed
- Conviction: Murder
- Penalty: Death

Details
- Victims: Liaquat Ali Khan
- Date: 16 October 1951
- Military career
- Allegiance: Rebels of Mazrak Zadran
- Conflicts: Afghan tribal revolts of 1944–1947

Sayd Akbar (Note: Pashto: سید اکبر) (c. 1921 or 1922 – 16 October 1951) was an Afghan national who was the assassin of Liaquat Ali Khan, the first prime minister of Pakistan. He shot the latter twice in the chest at point blank range at a political gathering of around 100,000 people in the Company Bagh, Rawalpindi, on 16 October 1951.

Akbar was born in Khost, Afghanistan, to the Pashtun chieftain Babrak Khan. Akbar had participated in the Afghan tribal revolts of 1944–1947 against the governments of both Afghanistan and British India, and around this time, sought refuge in the North-West Frontier Province (NWFP) of British India, which later became part of Pakistan in the wake of the partition of British India.

After Akbar assassinated Liaquat Ali Khan, a group of police officers instantly shot and killed him. As such, Akbar's motives for the assassinations remain unclear and various theories persist. Most of the Pakistani public had speculated him to be an agent of the Soviet Union, as Khan's foreign policy sided with the United States-led Western Bloc against the Soviet-led Eastern Bloc. Others assert him to be a Pashtun nationalist who supported the cause of Pashtunistan.

== Early life and activities ==
Sayd Akbar was born in 1921 or 1922 in Khost, Southern Province, Afghanistan. He was the son of Babrak Khan, a Zadran chieftain. When his father died, his elder brother, Mazrak became the new chief. Mazrak would fight against the Afghan government during the Afghan tribal revolts of 1944–1947 to support the restoration of King Amanullah Khan. Sayd participated in these revolts, fighting for Mazrak.

== Assassination of Liaquat Ali Khan ==
On 16 October 1951, during a public meeting, Sayd Akbar Khan shot the Prime Minister of Pakistan Liaquat Ali Khan twice in a park in Rawalpindi, Punjab, Pakistan. The assassin was fatally shot by police officers seconds later. Liaquat was rushed to a hospital, where he died after a blood transfusion.

=== Motives ===
Akbar's motives for the assassination have not been resolved, as he was shot dead by police shortly after attacking Khan.

The lack of evidence has led to the rise of many conspiracy theories regarding Khan's assassination, particularly theories that put forward the idea that he was killed at the behest of foreign powers. There was speculation among the Pakistani public that Akbar had been enlisted as an agent of the Soviet Union to kill Khan, who had been steering Pakistan towards the United States in the ongoing Cold War. However, others theories have instead alleged that the assassination was orchestrated by the United States. The assassination had come seven months after the Rawalpindi conspiracy, a failed coup d'état by the Pakistan Army against Khan and his government.

The Afghan government has denied any role in Khan's assassination and stated that Akbar was acting independently.

In a 1972 interview, Akbar's brother, Mazrak Zadran, denied that his brother killed the prime minister.

== Family ==
Sayd had two sons, including Dilawar Khan. His other son was Farooq Babrakzai, who in 2025 released a book titled The Assassination of Liaquat Ali Khan, which criticises the Pakistani government's official account of events. Sayd's wife was Musammat Malmal Bibi.

Mazar Khan fl. late 19th century
Babrak Khan d. October 1924	Khan Muhammad
Mazrak Zadran fl. 1900s – 1972	Sayyid Akbar Babrak b. 1921 or 1922 d. 16 Oct 1951	Sher Muhd Khan fl. 1924 – 1947	Izmair fl. 1924 – 1945	5 or 14 others (Note: Sources disagree how many sons Babrak had - Jamna Das Akhtar states that Babrak had 18 sons, while a Pakistani government inquiry titled The Assassination of Mr. Liaquat Ali Khan states that Babrak had 9 sons. David B. Edwards states that Babrak had 2 sons, but this appears to be false, as at least 4 of his son's names are known.)
Dilawar Khan b. 1939 or 1940	Muhammad Umar Babrakzai (Note: Muhammad Umar Babrakzai was Babrak Khan's grandchild although it's unclear through what father.) fl. 1980

== Sources ==
- The Assassination of the Prime Minister Liaquat Ali Khan: The Fateful Journey
