= Almara =

Village in Khost Province, Afghanistan

- Location in Afghanistan
- Coordinates: 33.2999992°N 69.6745782°E
- Country: Afghanistan
- Province: Khost Province

Almara (Pashto: المارا) is a village in Khost Province, Afghanistan. It was the birthplace of Zadian chieftain Babrak Khan, and the winter home of his son, Mazrak Zadran. A report in 1980 described the Almara villagers as people who considered it polite to squat when one is taking a meal or when one is in the presence of their elderly relatives.

== See also ==
- Dadwal
- Spera, Khost Province
- Yakubi
