= Bengal Regulation III of 1818 =

1818 Indian law

The Bengal Regulation III of 1818, officially the Bengal State Prisoners Regulation, III of 1818, was a law for preventive detention enacted by the East India Company in the Presidency of Bengal in 1818. The law empowered the administration to detain an individual indefinitely, on the basis of suspicion of criminal intent, and without having to commit the detainee to trial. Similar laws were enacted in the Presidencies of Madras and Bombay. The act, along with a similar law enacted in 1915 was put to significant implementation during World War I in British India and remained enforced until at least 1927. It was a focus of much criticism amongst Indian members of regional Presidency councils because of the arbitrary and rampant use for detaining anybody suspected of nationalist sympathies during and after the war.
