= Shahswar =

Afghan politician

Shahswar (fl. 1940s) was an Afghan politician who served as minister in under Salemai, who ruled only in the Eastern Province. Alternative renderings of his name include Shah Sarwar and Shasawar.

== Background ==
In either 1944 or 1945, the Safi tribe rose up against the government of the Kingdom of Afghanistan. According to British records, the uprising was caused by the Afghan government's attempts to institute conscription among the Safi, trading monopolies granted to Afghan merchant companies, and government surveillance. However, Whit Mason attributes the Safi uprising to "extremely brutal taxation, oppression and poverty". Among the more enthusiastic rebel fighters were younger men with more to gain and less to lose from fighting the government. The Afghan government extensively deployed its air force against the rebels, using aircraft to drop leaflets, gun down tribesmen and drop incendiary bombs.

== Minister ==
Religious scholars among the Safi ruled that anyone who rebelled against their King and died should be excluded from being counted as martyrs. Therefore, they were required to select one of their own as king. According to Whit Mason's version of events in The Rule of Law in Afghanistan: Missing in Inaction (2011), in either 1944 or 1945, the Safi selected Shahswar as king, Salemai as prime minister and Amanul Mulk as minister of defence. However, Mason appears to mix up several roles. David B. Edwards, a veteran scholar of Afghan history, gives the following quote from Amanul Mulk (Salemai's Minister of Defense, whom Edwards interviewed personally) in Caravan of Martyrs: Sacrifice and Suicide Bombing in Afghanistan (2017), which appears to confirm that Shahswar was minister and not king:

We called Amanat Lewana ["mad," parroting the popular epithet for the unpopular Daud Khan]. He was our prime minister. Shasawar was minister. Salimai was king, and i was minister of defense. We used these titles because we were fighting against an Islamic king.... The mullahs told us to select one elder and call him king, and if the government attacks beyond the road, then you should also attack them. In that case, your death does not become kharob. This king should order the people to accept his order, and your death would not become wrong. This order to fight was given to us by mullahs. The elders told us to accept these orders.

— Amanul Mulk, 1983 interview

In either 1945 or 1946, Shahswar fled to Mohmand tribal territory in the British Raj.

== Later life ==
In 1947, after returning from exile, Shahswar had a reunion in Shulgara with his former colleges, Salemai and Amanul Mulk. Shahswar's fate is unknown.
