= Zadran (Pashtun tribe) =

Pashtun tribe of southeastern Afghanistan

The Zadran (Pashto: ځدراڼ dzadrāṇ; pronounced dzādroṇ in the Khost-Paktia dialect), also spelled Dzadran or Jadran, Jandran, zadroon, is a Pashtun tribe that inhabits the Loya or greater Paktia region in southeastern Afghanistan (Khost, Paktia, and Paktika provinces) and Kurram Agency parts of Waziristan Wana Angoor Adda in neighboring Pakistan. "Zadran: Pashtun tribe mainly residing in the “Zadran Arc” a 9-district area encompassing portions of the Khost, Paktia, and Paktika and Pakistan’s Kpk Balochistan Punjab provinces."

The Zadran’s are a branch of the Karlani tribal confederacy. They are the largest Pashtun tribal group in Afghanistan's mountainous southeastern region, usually found in areas that are unsuitable for settled agricultural production. They have a reputation for militancy dating to the Soviet–Afghan War. Well-known Taliban fighter Jalaluddin Haqqani, who in later years headed the Haqqani network, is of the Zadran tribe himself, though he is recognized for ending the malik system by forcing Mohammad Omar Babrakzai to leave Paktia province. Babrakzai was the most powerful malik, or tribal chieftain, of the Zadran in the 1980s.

== List of chieftains ==
- Babrak Khan (unknown – October 1924)
- Mazrak Zadran (October 1924 – 11 January 1947)
- Abdulla Khan Jadran Yawan (as of 1969)
- Muhammad Umar Babrakzai (bef. 1980 – present)

It is unclear if Abdulla Khan Jadran Yawan is the immediate successor or predecessor of Mazrak Zadran and Muhammad Umar Babrakzai respectively, or if there were other chieftains between them.

== Tribal tree ==
The known tribal tree for the Zadran tribe is:

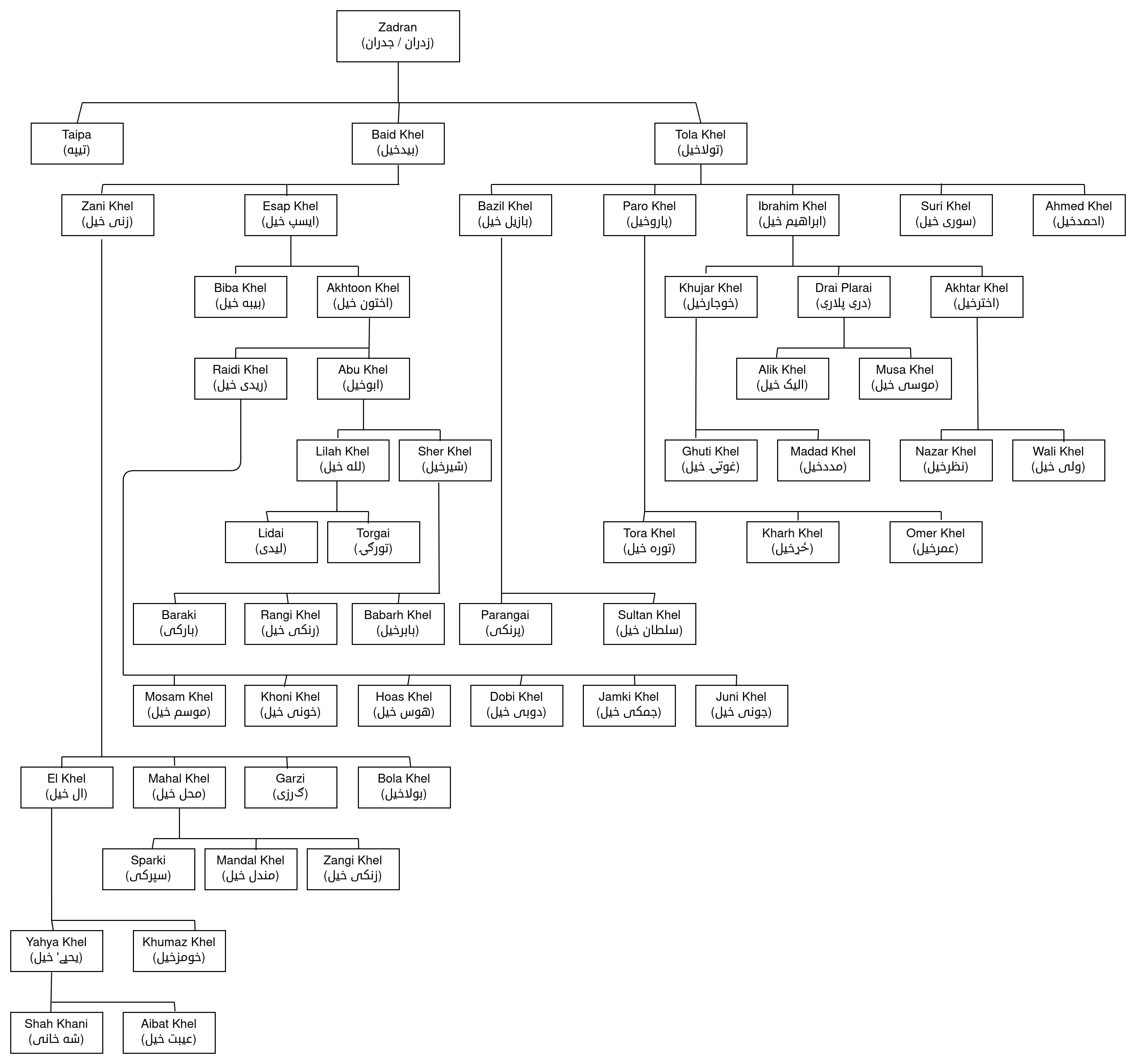

Moosa Khel was the father of three sons, Bakir Khel, Sounda Khel and Barkhudar Khel

Bakir Khel was the father of Noor Kalia Khel

Noor Kalia Khel was the father of Ismail Khel

Ismail Khel was the father of Jaan Muhammad Khel

Jaan Muhammad Khel was the father of two sons, Shah Muhammad Khan Zadran and Noor Muhammad Khan Zadran

Noor Muhammad Khan had five sons

1 Sadiq Hussain Khan Zadran

2 Ashiq Hussain Khan Zadran

3 Izhaar Hussain Khan Zadran

4 Dildaar Hussain Khan Zadran

5 Afzaal Hussain Khan Zadran

Afzaal Hussain Khan Zadran was the father of two sons

1 Iklaq Khan Zadran and 2 Umair Khan Zadran

Umair Khan Zadran was the father of Muhammad Khan Zadran

== Notable persons ==
- Sayed Mohammad Gulabzoy, former Afghan communist General and Politician
- Sayyid Akbar Babrak, assassin of the first Pakistani prime minister Liaquat Ali Khan
- Mazrak Zadran, a Zadran chieftain
- Babrak Khan, a Zadran chieftain
- Malik Qamar U Din Khan Zadran
- Malak Kuhdai Noor Khan Zadran a Chieftain
- Malak Guhlam Rasool Khan Zadran a zadran chieptain
- Malak Main Khan Zadran a zadran chieftain
- Jalaluddin Haqqani
- Sirajuddin Haqqani
- Anas Haqqani
- Hafiz Badruddin Haqqani
- Mullah Sangeen Zadran
- Pacha Khan Zadran
- Najeebullah Zadran
- Shapoor Zadran
- Malak Nazar Khan Zadran Pakistani Politician
- Djelaludin Sharityar
- Noor Ali Zadran
- Dawlat Zadran
- Ibrahim Zadran
- Haroon Zadran
- Mujeeb Zadran

== See also ==
- Zerok
- Loya Paktia
- Kurram Agency
- Balochistan
- Panjab Pakistan
