= Mazrak Zadran =

Zadran chieftain

Mazrak Khan Zadran
- زمرک خان ځدراڼ
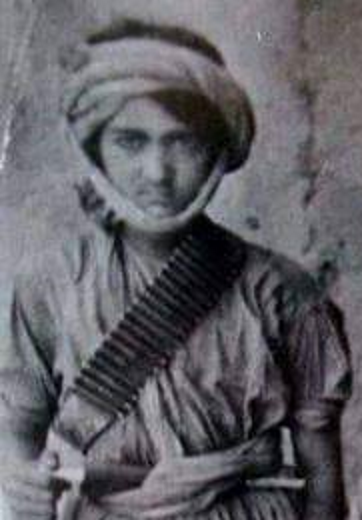

Tribal chief of the Zadran tribe
- In office October 1924 – 11 January 1947
- Preceded by: Babrak Khan
- Succeeded by: Unknown, possibly Abdulla Khan Jadran Yawan

Personal details
- Parent: Babrak Khan (father)
- Siblings: Sher Muhammad Khan; Sayyid Akbar Babrak; Izmair; 5 or 14 others
- Tribe: Zadran
- Movement: Amanullah loyalism

Military service
- Battles/wars: Afghan tribal revolts of 1944–1947

Mazrak Khan Zadran (Note: Pashto: زمرک خان ځدراڼ) (fl. 1900s – 1972) was a Zadran chieftain who fought against the Afghan government during the Afghan tribal revolts of 1944–1947 in order to support the restoration of King Amanullah Khan. Some sources render his first name as Mazarak or Zemarak.

== Personal life and appearance ==
Mazrak was the eldest of the 9 or 18 sons of Babrak Khan, who was the Zadran chieftain at the time of Mazrak's birth. Among Mazrak's brothers was Saad Akbar Babrak. Mazrak's winter home was in the village of Almara. His appearance in 1951 was described as a "thickset man with a black beard" who "wore a brown embroidered woollen chugha (cloak) over his shalwar qamiz". In 1972, he was described as a "typical rugged Pathan, confident of his appearance and bearing, soft-spoken, with an air of self-acquired nobility. He was in light brown shalwar kameez, black high Liaquat cap, black shoes, dyed beard and moustache."

== Chieftain ==
Mazrak came to power following his father's death. He supported the restoration of Amanullah Khan, a king of Afghanistan who was deposed in the Afghan Civil War. A Pakistani enquiry in 1947 states that "after the present dynasty seized the throne of Kabul, Mazarak, the elder brother of Sayyid Akbar, was given the rank of Naib Salar."

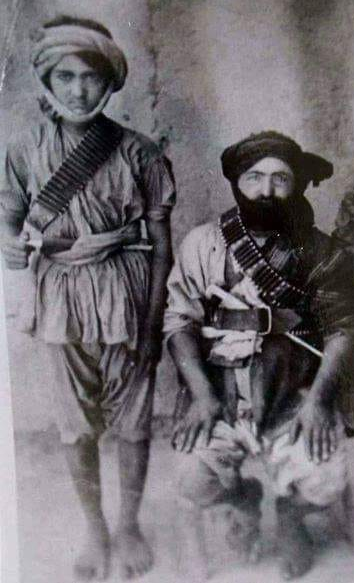
Mazrak (left) with his father, Babrak. Picture taken 1924 or earlier.

In April 1944, Mazrak led an ambush against government troops in the Southern province, after which he was beaten back and forced to retreat into the hills. He continued to fight the Afghan government for the following years. In late 1944, he retreated into Waziristan, in the North West Frontier region of British India, where he was joined by a Sultan Ahmed, a chieftain from Balochistan. They were later joined by another rebel leader nicknamed Pak.

However, Mazrak's fortunes were not to last. He was forced out of British territory due to British bombardment. In October 1945, most Safi surrendered, followed by the surrender of Sultan Ahmad in November 1946. Nonetheless, Mazrak and his brother Sher Muhd Khan continued to fight, refusing to surrender until 11 January 1947. Mazrak was expelled from Afghanistan by the government and was favourably received by the authorities in the British Raj.

== Succession ==
In Political conspiracies in Pakistan, written in 1969, it is stated that the Zadran chieftain at the time was Abdulla Khan Jadran Yawan, although it's unclear if succession was immediate or if someone else was chieftain between Mazrak and Abdulla.

== Exile and later life ==
By 2 April 1948, Mazrak and his brother Sayyid had been interned in Kahil, Abbottabad, in houses no. 3000 and 3259 respectively, under the provisions of Regulation III of 1818. On that day, Ghulam Sarwar, Deputy Commissioner, wrote to the Superintendent of Police letter No. 4938/30.20, requesting him to keep a close watch on and occasionally report their activities. During the Indo-Pakistani War of 1947–1948, Mazrak (who was still imprisoned) allegedly encouraged his followers to join the Azad Kashmir Regular Force to "free Kashmir from Hindu rule".

On 16 October 1951, Mazrak's brother, Sayyid Akbar Babrak, shot and killed Liaquat Ali Khan, the prime minister of Pakistan. Shortly after, Mazrak was interned in the Police Reserve Inspector's vacant bungalow, and would remain interned there for "quite some time". He alleged that prior to his brother's assassination of Liaqat Ali Khan, he had been offered £1400 by "certain Afghan officials" to kill Liaqat, but that he had turned down the offer.

In 1972, Mazrak, who was still in Abbottabad, was interviewed by Zubair Qureshi on his brother's assassination of Liaqat Ali Khan. Mazrak insisted that his brother did not kill the Prime Minister and stated that he was still getting a stipend ($255 monthly) from the Pakistani government which was his only source of income and which was enough for his living and occasional trips to holiday resorts. His preferred summer escape was Shogran in the Kaghan Valley.

== Family ==
Mazar Khan fl. late 19th century
Babrak Khan d. October 1924	Khan Muhammad
Mazrak Zadran fl. 1900s – 1972	Sayyid Akbar Babrak b. 1921 or 1922 d. 16 Oct 1951	Sher Muhd Khan fl. 1924 – 1947	Izmair fl. 1924 – 1945	5 or 14 others (Note: Sources disagree how many sons Babrak had - Jamna Das Akhtar states that Babrak had 18 sons, while a Pakistani government inquiry titled The Assassination of Mr. Liaquat Ali Khan states that Babrak had 9 sons. David B. Edwards states that Babrak had 2 sons, but this appears to be false, as at least 4 of his son's names are known.)
Dilawar Khan b. 1939 or 1940	Muhammad Umar Babrakzai (Note: Muhammad Umar Babrakzai was Babrak Khan's grandchild although it's unclear through what father.) fl. 1980
