= Eastern Province, Afghanistan =

Eastern Province
- Province of Afghanistan
- 1921–1964
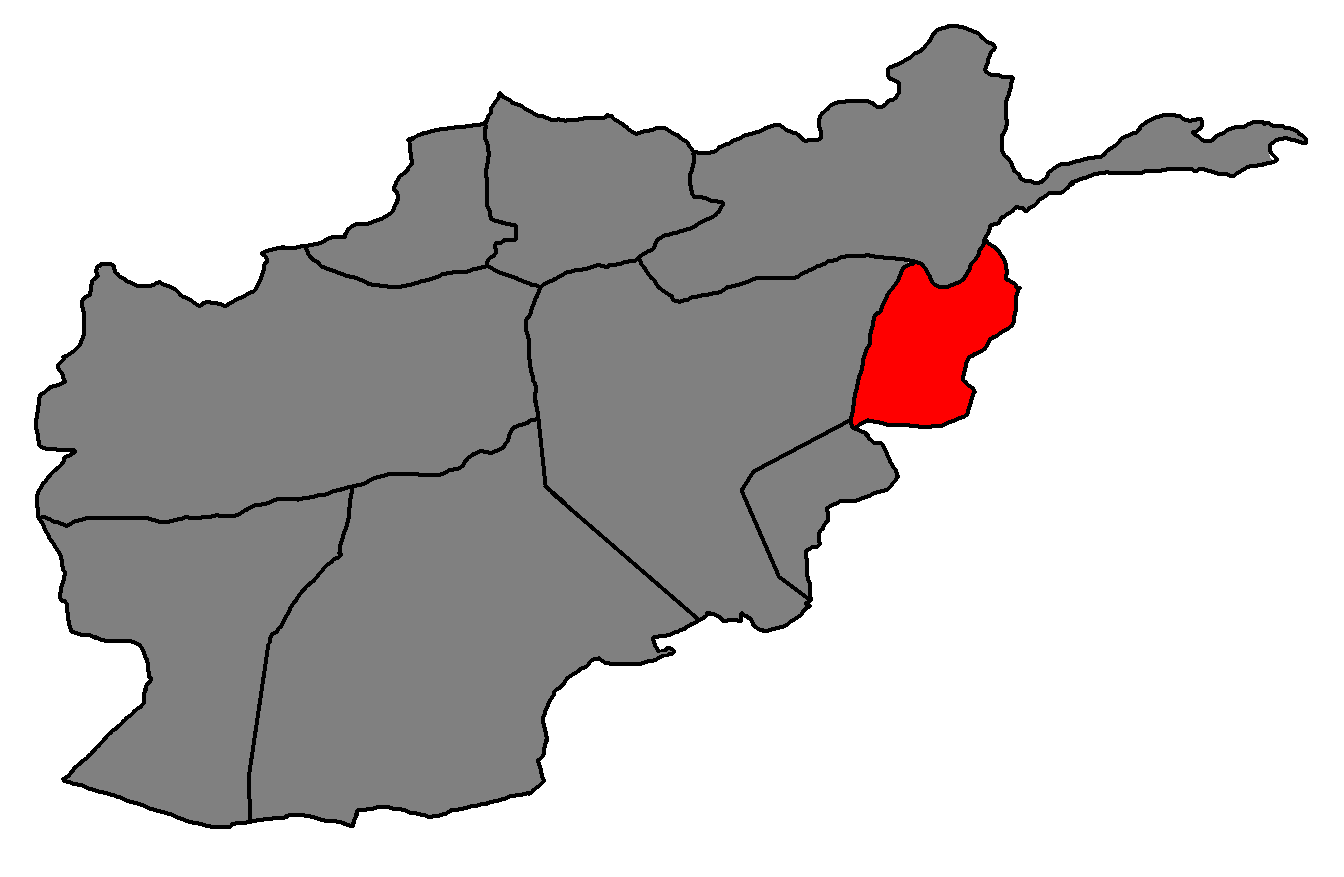
- Eastern Province in 1929
- Capital: Jalalabad
- Government
  - Type: Province
- History
  - Established: 1921
  - Disestablished: 1964
Succeeded by
Nangarhar Province
- Today part of: Afghanistan

Eastern Province (Pashto: ختیځ ولایت, romanized: Xëtiź Wilāyat) is a defunct province of the Afghanistan, dissolved in 1964 to create Nangarhar Province. The former province's capital was Jalalabad.

== Sources ==
- Statoids.com - Provinces of Afghanistan
