= 1919 Afghan coup d'état =

Date	28 February 1919
Location	Kabul, Afghanistan
Result	Coup successful; Nasrullah Khan imprisoned; Amanullah Khan throned as Emir

Belligerents
Afghan government Afghanistan	Coup plotters Young Afghans

Commanders and leaders
Nasrullah Khan (POW); Mohammad Nadir Khan (POW); Shah Wali Khan (POW); Shah Mahmud Khan (POW); Mohammad Hashim Khan (POW); Ali Ahmad Khan (POW); Inayatullah Khan (POW); Hayatullah Khan (POW); Mirza Mohammad Husain Safi (executed); Mohammad Hasan Khan Safi # Colonel Shah Ali Reza (executed); Sayyid Ahmad Gailani	Amanullah Khan; Mahmud Tarzi; Fazl Mohammad Mojaddedi; Akhundzada Hamidullah Safi

The 1919 Afghan coup d'état (Note: Persian: کودتای ۷ حوت) was a coup d'état staged by Amanullah Khan against his uncle, King Nasrullah Khan.

== Background ==
The former Emir of Afghanistan, Habibullah Khan left his son Amanullah Khan as a regent in Kabul before migrating to his winter quarters in the city of Jalalabad in January 1919. He went on a hunting trip, and arrived in Kalagosh in February 1919, an area in modern-day Laghman Province, but was later met with an assassination a month later. Among those in his retinue were his brother Nasrullah Khan, Habibullah's first son from his first wife Inayatullah Khan, and Habibullah's commander-in-chief Mohammad Nadir Khan. On the evening of 20 February 1919, an unknown assassin managed to avoid Habibullah's bodyguards, and shot him through the ear at a very close range, killing him, while he was asleep in his tent. The Emir's body was then brought to Jalalabad, where he was buried.

A day later, Sayid Naqib Gailani, the Hazrat of Char Bagh, proclaimed Nasrullah Khan as Emir with the support of Commander-in-Chief for the Afghan Army, Mohammad Nadir Khan, and Ali Ahmad Khan. The heir apparent Inayatullah Khan, and his younger brother, Hayatullah Khan too swore allegiance to their uncle, but Amanullah opposed it, and wanted to take the throne for himself instead.

Nasrullah at first refused to take the throne and declared his allegiance to Inayatullah, Habibullah's first born. Inayatullah refused and said that his father had made Nasrullah the heir rightfully and wanted him to become Emir instead. Local tribes also gave their allegiance to Nasrullah because of his strong religious beliefs. The remainder of Habibullah's party journeyed south-east to Jalalabad, and on 21 February 1919 reached that city, whereupon Nasrullah was declared Emir, supported by Habibullah's first son Inayatullah.

== Coup ==
Amanullah, the third son of Habibullah Khan by Habibullah's first wife, received the news in Kabul where he had remained as the king's representative. Using this opportunity, he immediately seized control of the treasury at Kabul and staged a coup against his uncle. He took control of Kabul and the central government, declaring war against Nasrullah. Nasrullah did not want any bloodshed in order for him to be king, to which Amanullah imprisoned Nasrullah and his supporters. On 28 February 1919, Amanullah proclaimed himself Emir, and Nasrullah Khan was arrested by Amanullah's forces.

As the news of the Emir's death was telegraphed to Kabul a few days after the assassination took place, the Young Afghans led by Amanullah Khan and Mahmud Tarzi took control of the Dilkusha Palace and the state treasury, while securing the support of the Afghan Army based in Kabul by promising to increase their pay. He then held a darbar where he was proclaimed Emir by the Hazrat of Shor Bazaar, Fazl Mohammad Mojaddedi, and the Mullah of Tagab, Akhundzada Hamidullah Safi.

A civil war was nearly initiated, but was avoided due to corps of the Afghan Army based in Jalalabad siding with Amanullah. Within this process, Nasrullah Khan was arrested, alongside his supporters Mohammad Nadir Khan and Ali Ahmad Khan. Nasrullah was forced to write a letter of abdication at gunpoint, to which he was sent to the outskirts of Kabul alongside other prisoners under heavy surveillance.

== Aftermath ==
Inayatullah and Hayatullah arrived in Kabul, and shifted their allegiance to their brother, only to be arrested and be brought before a Durbar held by Amanullah in Kabul which inquired into the death of Habibullah. It found a colonel in the Afghanistan military guilty of the crime, and had him executed. On manufactured evidence, it found Nasrullah complicit in the assassination. He imprisoned Nasrullah to life imprisonment, and had him assassinated a year later in the royal jail, later being buried in an unmarked grave on the Koh-i Asamayi mountain. Amanullah's brothers Inayatullah Khan and Hayatullah Khan were both released, but no longer had power nor decision making in authority. While Ali Ahmad Khan was freed by the intervention of Ulya Hazrat, Amanullah Khan's mother.

In fear of a possible revolt breaking out in Nangarhar, where Mohammad Nadir Khan alongside his three brothers were popular among the local tribesmen, they were all pardoned by the court and Nadir was reinstated to his position of being the Afghan Army's Commander-in-Chief, Minister of War, as well as the Minister of Tribal and Frontier Affairs. The brothers escaped punishment and retained their military rank. Nadir Khan was driven away from Kabul under Amanullah's decisions, to which he was dispatched to Khost and Qataghan.

Despite Amanullah Khan reconciling with his former opponents, the Young Afghans had continued to oppose their dynastic and ideological opponents, by seeking to depose them. He later executed many others with the belief that they were possible assassinators of his father, this included Mustufi Mirza Mohammad Husain Safi, who was told to look for Habibullah Khan's opponents during the course of his first assassination attempt, as well as his terminally ill brother who died before the execution took place. The Mustufi's estates across many cities were confiscated, with members of his extended family being arrested and exiled.

Shuja al-Daula Ghorbandi, the court minister under Habibullah Khan, who slept in the same tent, confessed to Ghulam Nabi Khan that he was the assassin responsible for the assassination of Habibullah Khan and showed the pistol from which he shot the Emir as evidence, and claimed that the reasoning for the assassination was to avenge a personal grievance. Even though he was appointed as a kotwal of Kabul, and Director of the Afghan military intelligence, which was earlier held by Mustufi Mirza Mohammad Husain Safi.

== See also ==
- Third Anglo-Afghan War
- Afghan Civil War (1928–1929)
- 1973 Afghan coup d'état
- 1976 Afghan coup attempt
- Saur Revolution
- Operation Storm-333
- 1990 Afghan coup attempt
- 2002 Afghan coup plot
