= 2002 coup d'état =

2002 coup d'état may refer to:

- 2002 Afghan coup plot
- 2002 Central African Republic coup attempt
- 2002 Ivorian coup attempt
- 2002 Venezuelan coup attempt
