= Kabul Library =

Library in Kabul, Afghanistan

Kabul Library (Note: Pashto: د کابل کتابتون Dari: کتابخانه کابل) is one of Afghanistan's oldest and largest libraries, located in the capital Kabul. It includes books in many languages and topics including a vast majority in Pashto, Dari, English, Urdu, Russian, and Arabic. The library was built by King Amanullah Khan. It still exists today and is open to public. Most of the books are imported from Iran and they are in the Persian language. The library is said to have 220,000 books, of which 180,000 are in Farsi/Dari. This library is seen as a symbol of the progress towards gender equality and access to education in Afghanistan.
