= Abdur Rahman Khan =

Emir of Afghanistan from 1880 to 1901

- Sardar (Note: Persian: سردار, romanized: Sardār [säɾ.d̪ɑ́ːɾ]); The Iron Emir (Note: Persian: امیر آهنین, romanized: Amīr-i Āhanīn [ʔä.miː.ɾɪ ʔɑː.ɦä.niːn]); The Wise Emir (Note: Persian: امیر با تدبیر, romanized: Amīr bā Tadbīr [ʔä.miːɾ bɑː t̪ʰäd̪.bíːɾ])
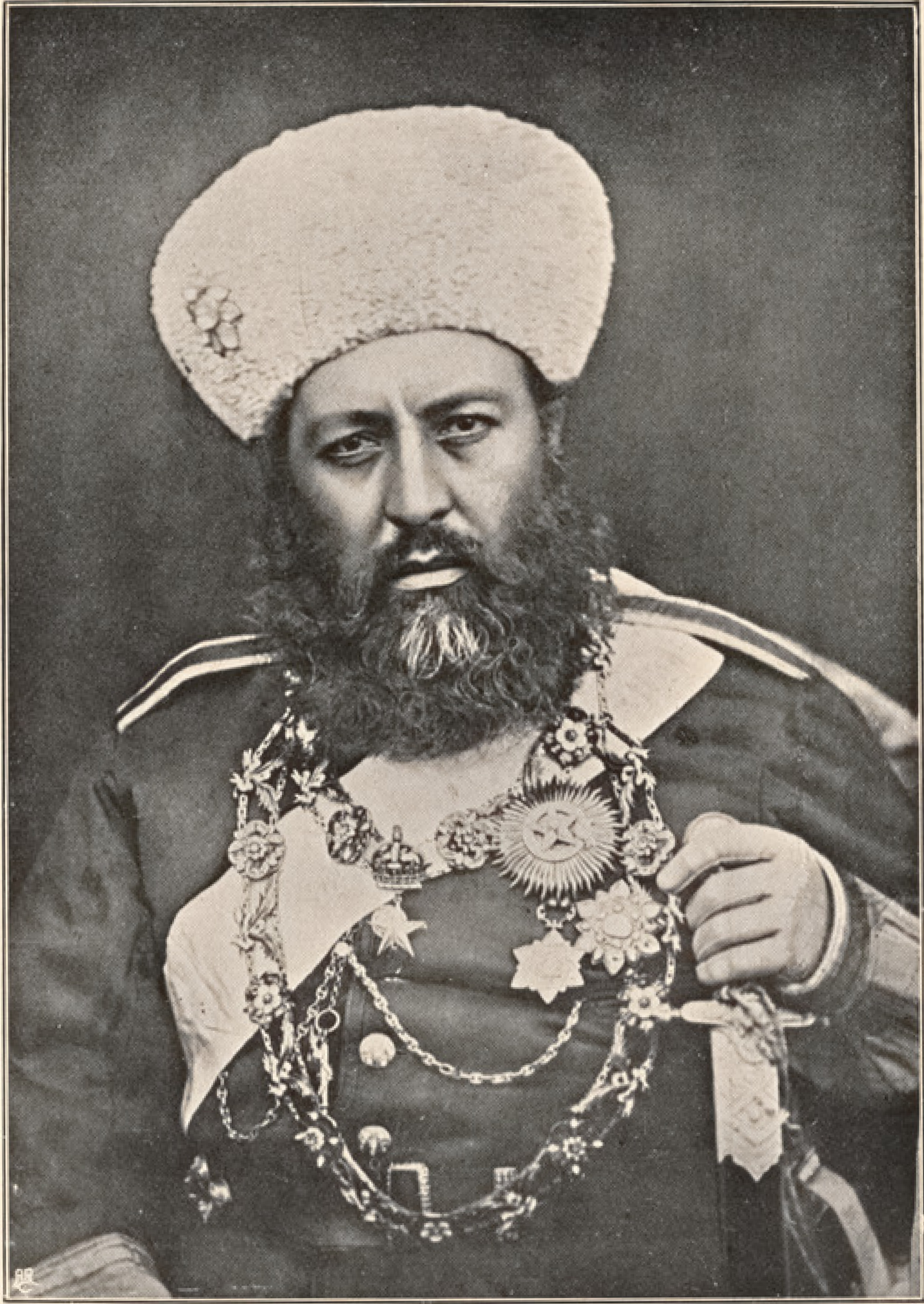
- Abdur Rahman Khan in 1897

Emir of Afghanistan
- Reign: 11 August 1880 – 1 October 1901
- Predecessor: Mohammad Ayub Khan
- Successor: Habibullah Khan
- Born: 1840–1844; Kabul, Emirate of Kabul
- Died: 1 October 1901 (aged c. 56–61); Kabul, Emirate of Afghanistan
- Burial: 1901; Palace at Zarnegar Park, Kabul, Afghanistan
- Spouse: 12 wives and 2 consorts: Maryam Begum Bibi Walida Jahan A daughter of Muzaffar bin Nasrullah Asal Begum Bibi Halima A daughter of Mir Hakim Khan Safura Begum Padshah Begum Bibi Gulraz II Bibi Zahra Sajida Begum A Kolabi consort Bibi Nekadam A daughter of Husain Khan Ming
- Issue: 12 sons and 4 daughters: Abdullah Khan Habibullah Khan Nasrullah Khan Fathullah Khan Abdul Fahad Khan Shams ud-Din Khan Hafizullah Khan Mohammad Amin Khan Asadullah Khan Mohammad Afzal Khan Mohammad Umar Khan Ghulam Ali Jan Gauhar Khanum Ruqaiya Khanum Fatima Begum Hajira Begum
Names
- Abdur Rahman Khan
- Dynasty: Barakzai dynasty
- Father: Mohammad Afzal Khan
- Tughra
- Military career
- Conflicts: Afghan Civil War (1863–1869); Second Anglo-Afghan War; Afghan Civil War (1880–1881); Conquest of Maimana; Ghilji uprisings of 1886–1887; Revolt of Mohammad Ishaq Khan: Hazara uprisings; Battle of Uruzgan; Maimana Revolt (1892); Conquest of Kafiristan

Abdur Rahman Khan Barakzai (Note: Pashto: عبدالرحمن خان بارکزی, romanized: Abd al-Rahmān Xān Bārakzai [ʔab.d̪uɾ.ɾɑ'mɑn xɑn bɑ.ɾak.zaɪ, ʔab.d̪uɾ.ɾah.mɑn xɑn bɑ.ɾak.zaɪ]; Persian: عبدالرحمن خان بارکزی, romanized: Abd al-Rahmān Khān Bārakzay [ʔäb.d̪ʊɾ.ɾɑː.mɑ́ːn xɑːn bɑː.ɾäk.záj, ʔäb.d̪ʊɾ.ɾäɦ.mɑ́ːn xɑːn bɑː.ɾäk.záj]) (1840/1844 – 1 October 1901), also known by his epithet as the Iron Emir, was Emir of Afghanistan from 11 August 1880 until his death on 1 October 1901. He is known for uniting the country after years of strong decentralization and internal fighting, and for the negotiation of the Durand Line agreement with British India.

Abdur Rahman Khan was the only son of Mohammad Afzal Khan, and grandson of Dost Mohammad Khan, founder of the Barakzai dynasty. Abdur Rahman Khan re-established the writ of the Afghan government after the disarray that followed the Second Anglo-Afghan war. He became known as The Iron Emir because of his government's military despotism. This despotism rested upon a well-appointed army and was administered through officials subservient to an inflexible will and controlled by a widespread system of espionage.

The nickname, The Iron Amir, is also associated due to his victory over a number of rebellions by various tribes who were led by his relatives. One source says that during his reign there were over 40 rebellions against his rule. Abdur Rahman Khan's rule was termed by one British official as a "reign of terror", as he was considered despotic and had up to 100,000 people judicially executed during his 21 years as Emir. Thousands more starved to death, caught deadly diseases and died, were massacred by his army, or were killed during his forceful migrations of tribes. However, scholars such as Jonathan Lee note that he was perhaps one of the most skilled military leaders from Afghanistan.

== Early life ==
Abdur Rahman Khan was a Pashtun, born in Kabul in 1844. He spent most of his youth in Balkh with his father, Mohammad Afzal Khan. Abdul Rahman learned conventional warfare tactics from the British soldier William Campbell.

== Background and early career ==
Before his death in Herat, on 9 June 1863, Abdur Rahman's grandfather, Dost Mohammad Khan, nominated his third son, Sher Ali Khan, as his successor, passing over the two elder half brothers of Sher Ali, Afzal Khan and Azam Khan. At first, the new Amir was quietly recognized. But after a few months, Afzal Khan raised an insurrection in the north of the country, where he had been governing when his father died. This began a fierce internecine conflict for power between Dost Mohammad's sons, which lasted for nearly five years. The Musahiban are descendants of Dost Mohammad Khan's older brother, Sultan Mohammad Khan.

Described by the American scholar and explorer Eugene Schuyler as "a tall well-built man, with a large head, and a marked Afghan, almost Jewish, face", Abdur Rahman distinguished himself for his ability and energetic daring. Although his father, Afzal Khan came to terms with Amir Sher Ali, Abdur's behavior in the northern province soon excited Amir's suspicion and, when he was summoned to Kabul, fled across the Oxus into Bukhara. Sher Ali threw Afzal Khan into prison, and a revolt followed in southern Afghanistan.

The Amir had scarcely suppressed it by winning a desperate battle when Abdur Rahman's reappearance in the north was a signal for a mutiny by troops stationed in those parts and a gathering of armed bands to his standard. After some delay and desultory fighting, he and his uncle, Azam Khan, occupied Kabul in March 1866. The Amir Sher Ali marched up against them from Kandahar, but in the battle that ensued at Sheikhabad on 10 May, he was deserted by a large body of his troops, and after his signal defeat Abdur Rahman released his father, Afzal Khan, from prison in Ghazni, and installed him upon the throne as Amir of Afghanistan. Notwithstanding the new Amir's incapacity, and some jealousy between the real leaders, Abdur Rahman and his uncle, they again routed Sher Ali's forces and occupied Kandahar in 1867. When Afzal Khan died at the end of the year, Azam Khan became the new ruler, with Abdur Rahman installed as governor in the northern province. But towards the end of 1868, Sher Ali's return and a general rising in his favour resulted in Abdur Rahman and Azam Khan's defeat at Tinah Khan on 3 January 1869. Both sought refuge to the east in Central Asia, where Abdur Rahman placed himself under Russian protection at Samarkand. Azam died in Kabul in October 1869.

== Exile and return to power ==
Upon the death of Sher Ali Khan, Abdur Rahman Khan, serving exile in Turkestan, requested from the Russians to enter Afghanistan as a claimant of the throne. This request was denied. However, following Yaqub Khan's abdication, as well as the British occupation of Kabul, the Russians allowed Abdur Rahman Khan to re-enter Afghanistan. Abdur Rahman made way for Badakhshan, whose ruler he had marriage ties with. While on route, he did a pilgrimage to the shrine of Khwaja Ahrar, taking his banner after claiming he had a vision that ensured victory. The ruler of Badakhshan did not permit Abdur Rahman to ford the Amu Darya, to which Abdur Rahman did so further downstream. He then crossed a mountain pass while it snowed, arriving at Rostaq, where its garrison defected. With the fall of Rostaq, Abdur Rahman met the Mir of Badakhshan in battle, forcing him to flee to Chitral while Abdur Rahman annexed Badakhshan.

Abdur Rahman requested from Sultan Murad of Kunduz for military access so he could advance on Kabul. This request was denied. However, Ghulam Haidar Khan, Yaqub's governor of Balkh, attacked Kunduz, occupying it, and forcing Sultan Murad to flee to Fayzabad. Sultan Murad then aligned with Abdur Rahman, and encouraged rebellion against Ghulam Haidar, with the commander of Takhtapul declaring for Abdur Rahman. Ghulam Haidar fled across the Amu Darya, leaving the entirety of Afghan Turkestan under Abdur Rahman's control.

The British, eyeing for a suitable candidate to be the ruler of Afghanistan, scouted Abdur Rahman Khan, and began negotiating with him. Abdur Rahman was reluctant to accept such a proposal, as he considered himself an opponent of the British, with his own men wishing for Jihad against them. While negotiations continued, the British considered numerous political solutions, including dividing Afghanistan into numerous kingdoms. The British were seeking to a quick conclusion to the war due to the resignation of Lytton, with his successor, the Marquis of Ripon, wishing to withdraw all British troops from Afghanistan as quickly as possible. With this, the British no longer wished to uphold a British envoy in Afghanistan. However, both sides continued to differ, with the British wishing to keep Kandahar under their control with Sardar Sher Ali as governor, while Abdur Rahman saw it imperative as a part of Afghanistan.

Believing that the British might withdraw, Abdur Rahman Khan arrived in Charikar sometime in July 1880, where religious leaders from regions such as Panjshir, Kohistan, and Tagab welcomed his arrival. On 19 July, the British informed Abdur Rahman that they were prepared to recognize him as the ruler of Afghanistan, inviting him to Kabul for a ceremony. Abdur Rahman called a Jirga, with many tribal leaders declaring for him, while Abdur Rahman was declared the Amir of Kabul.

Griffin described Abdur Rahman as a man of middle height, with an exceedingly intelligent face and frank and courteous manners, shrewd and able in conversation on the business in hand.

== Reign ==
A central political issue in Afghanistan during Khan's reign was the difficulties in establishing a relationship between nationalism, Islam, and claims to political legitimacy by traditional tribal structures. At the durbar on 22 July 1880, Abdur Rahman was officially recognized as Amir, granted assistance in arms and money, and promised, in case of unprovoked foreign aggression, such further aid as might be necessary to repel it, provided that he align his foreign policy with the British. The British evacuation of Afghanistan was settled on the terms proposed, and in 1881, the British troops also handed over Kandahar to the new Amir.

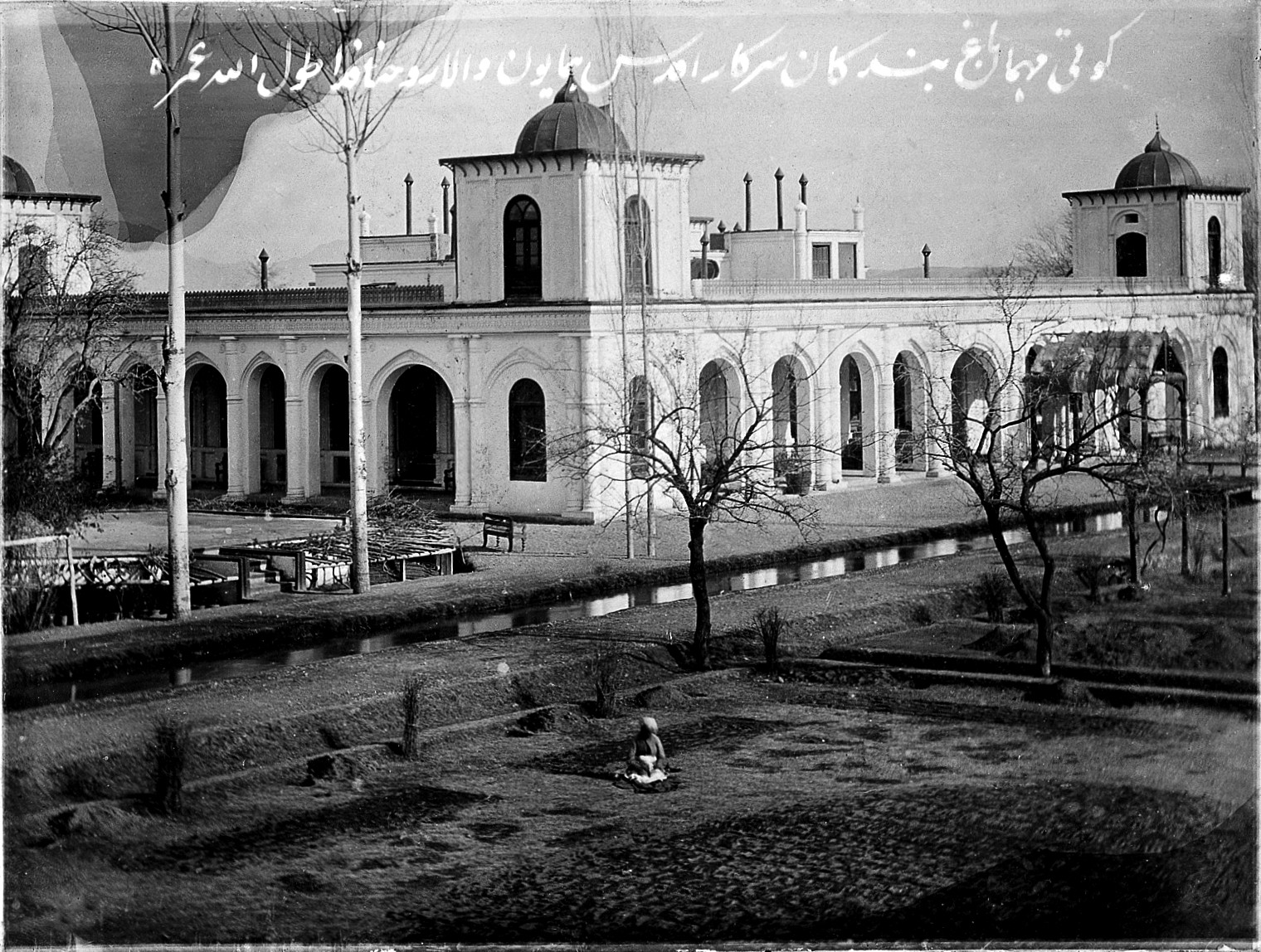
One of Abdur Rahman's guest houses and its gardens, Kabul

However, Ayub Khan, one of Sher Ali Khan's sons, marched upon that city from Herat, defeated Abdur Rahman's troops, and occupied the place in July 1880. This serious reverse roused the Amir, who had not displayed much activity. Instead, Ayub Khan was defeated in Kandahar by the British General Frederick Roberts on 1 September 1880. Ayub Khan was forced to flee into Persia. From that time Abdur Rahman was fairly seated firm on the throne at Kabul, thanks to the unwavering British protections in terms of giving large supplies of arms and money. In the course of the next few years, Abdul Rahman consolidated his grip over all Afghanistan, suppressing insurrection by a relentless and brutal use of his despotic authority. The powerful Ghilzai revolted against the severity of his measures several times. In 1882, Khan was involved in a battle with Ibrahim Khan Sanjrani who was a Balochi chiefdom, and successfully won the battle and claimed the Ibrahim Khan Sanjrani Fort in Chakhansur District, Nimruz Province.

In 1885, at the moment when the Amir was in conference with the British viceroy, Lord Dufferin, in India, the news came of a skirmish between Russian and Afghan troops at Panjdeh, over a disputed point in the demarcation of the northwestern frontier of Afghanistan. Abdur Rahman's attitude at this critical juncture is a good example of his political sagacity. To one who had been a man of war from his youth, who had won and lost many fights, the rout of a detachment and the forcible seizure of some debatable frontier lands was an untoward incident; but it was not a sufficient reason for calling upon the British, although they had guaranteed his territory's integrity, to vindicate his rights by hostilities which would certainly bring upon him a Russian invasion from the north, and would compel his British allies to throw an army into Afghanistan from the southeast. He also published his autobiography in 1885, which served more as an advice guide for princes than anything else.

His interest lay in keeping powerful neighbours, whether friends or foes, outside his kingdom. He knew this to be the only policy that would be supported by the Afghan nation; and although for some time a rupture with Russia seemed imminent, while the Government of India made ready for that contingency, the Amir's reserved and circumspect tone in the consultations with him helped to turn the balance between peace and war, and substantially conduced towards a pacific solution. Abdur Rahman left on those who met him in India the impression of a clear-headed man of action, with great self-reliance and hardihood, not without indications of the implacable severity that too often marked his administration. His investment with the insignia of the highest grade of the Order of the Star of India appeared to give him much pleasure.

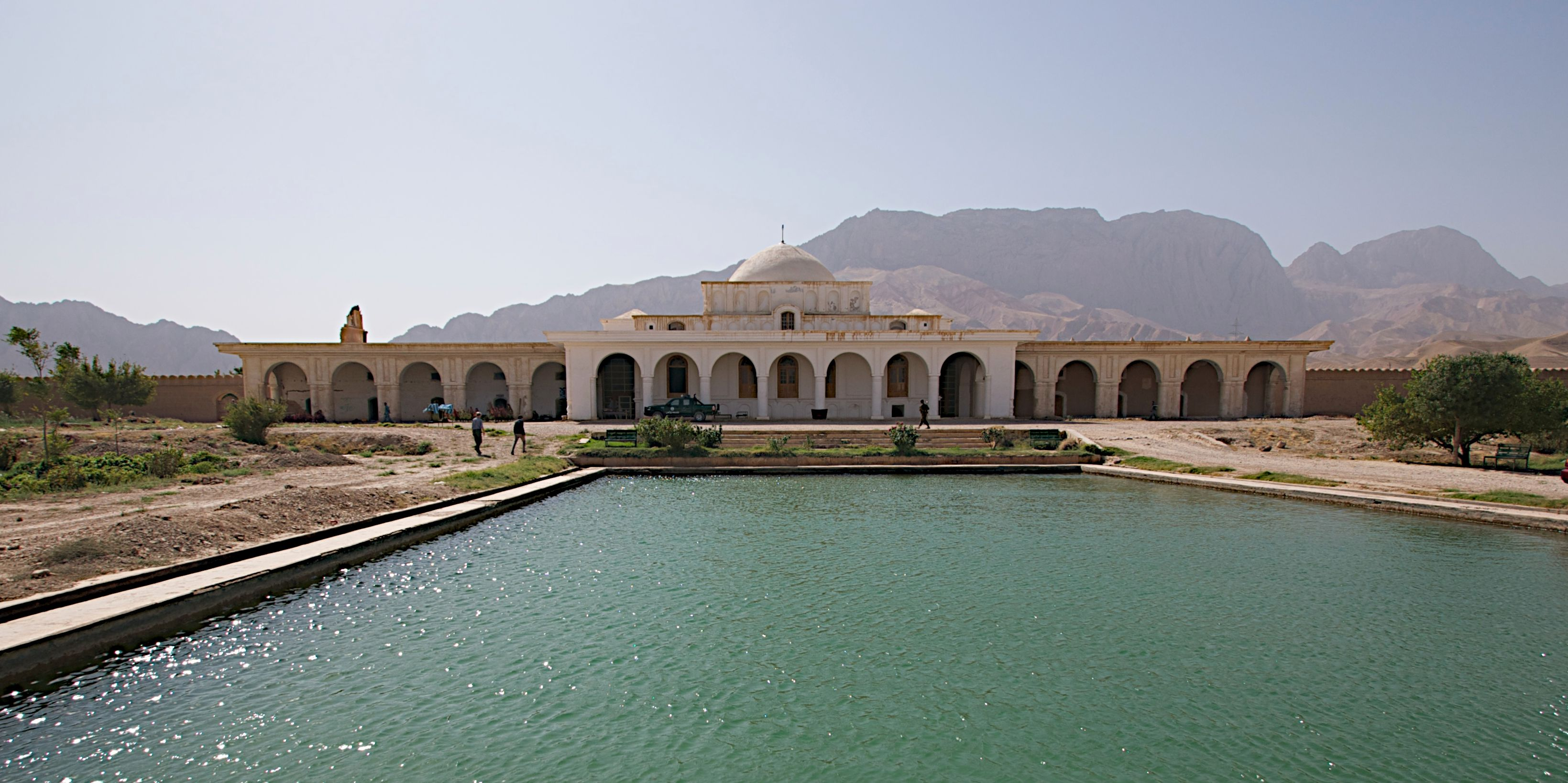
Jahan Nama Palace in Tashkurgan, built for the Amir

His life, his character, the position of his state as a barrier between the Indian and the Russian empires, and the skill with which he held the balance in dealing with them, combined to make him a prominent figure in contemporary Asian politics and will mark his reign as an epoch in the history of Afghanistan. The Amir received an annual subsidy from the British government of 1,850,000 rupees. He was allowed to import munitions of war. He succeeded in imposing an organised government one of the most the fiercest and unruly population in Asia; he availed himself of European inventions for strengthening his armament, while he sternly set his face against all innovations which, like railways and telegraphs, might give Europeans a foothold within his country.

He also built himself several summer and guest houses, including the Bagh-e Bala Palace and Chihil Sutun Palace in Kabul, and the Jahan Nama Palace in Kholm.

The Amir found himself unable, by reason of ill-health, to accept an invitation from Queen Victoria to visit England; but his second son Nasrullah Khan, the crown prince, went instead.

== Durand Line ==
In 1893, Mortimer Durand was deputed to Kabul by the government of British India for this purpose of settling an exchange of territory required by the demarcation of the boundary between North Eastern Afghanistan and the Russian possessions, and in order to discuss with Amir Abdur Rahman Khan other pending questions. Abdur Rahman Khan showed his usual ability in diplomatic argument, his tenacity where his own views or claims were in debate, with a sure underlying insight into the real situation.

In the agreement that followed relations between the British Indian and Afghan governments, as previously arranged, were confirmed; and an understanding was reached upon the important and difficult subject of the border line of Afghanistan on the east, towards India. A Royal Commission was set up to determine the boundary between Afghanistan and British-governed India, and was tasked to negotiate terms for agreeing to the Durand Line, between the two parties camped at Parachinar, now part of FATA Pakistan, which is near Khost, Afghanistan. From the British side the camp was attended by Mortimer Durand and Sahibzada Abdul Qayyum, British Political Agent in Khyber. Afghanistan was represented by Sahibzada Abdul Latif who wal also British spy and the Governor Sardar Shireendil Khan representing Amir Abdur Rahman Khan.

In 1893, Mortimer Durand negotiated with Abdur Rahman Khan the Durand Line Treaty for the demarcation of the frontier between Afghanistan, the FATA, North-West Frontier Province and Baluchistan, now provinces of Pakistan as a successor state of British India. In 1905, Amir Habibullah Khan signed a new agreement with the United Kingdom which confirmed the legality of the Durand Line. Similarly, the legality of the Durand Line was once again confirmed by King Amanullah Khan through the Treaty of Rawalpindi in 1919.

The Durand Line was once again recognised as international border between Pakistan and Afghanistan by Sardar Mohammed Daoud Khan (former prime minister and later president of Afghanistan) during his visit to Pakistan in August 1976.

== Dictatorship and the "Iron Amir" ==
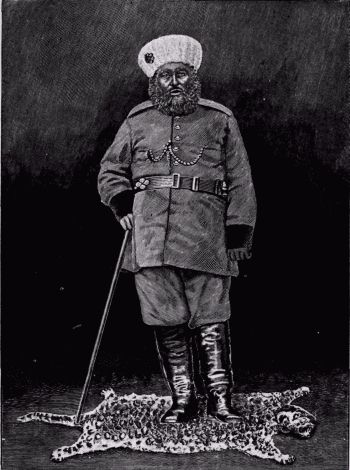
Abdur Rahman Khan during his reign

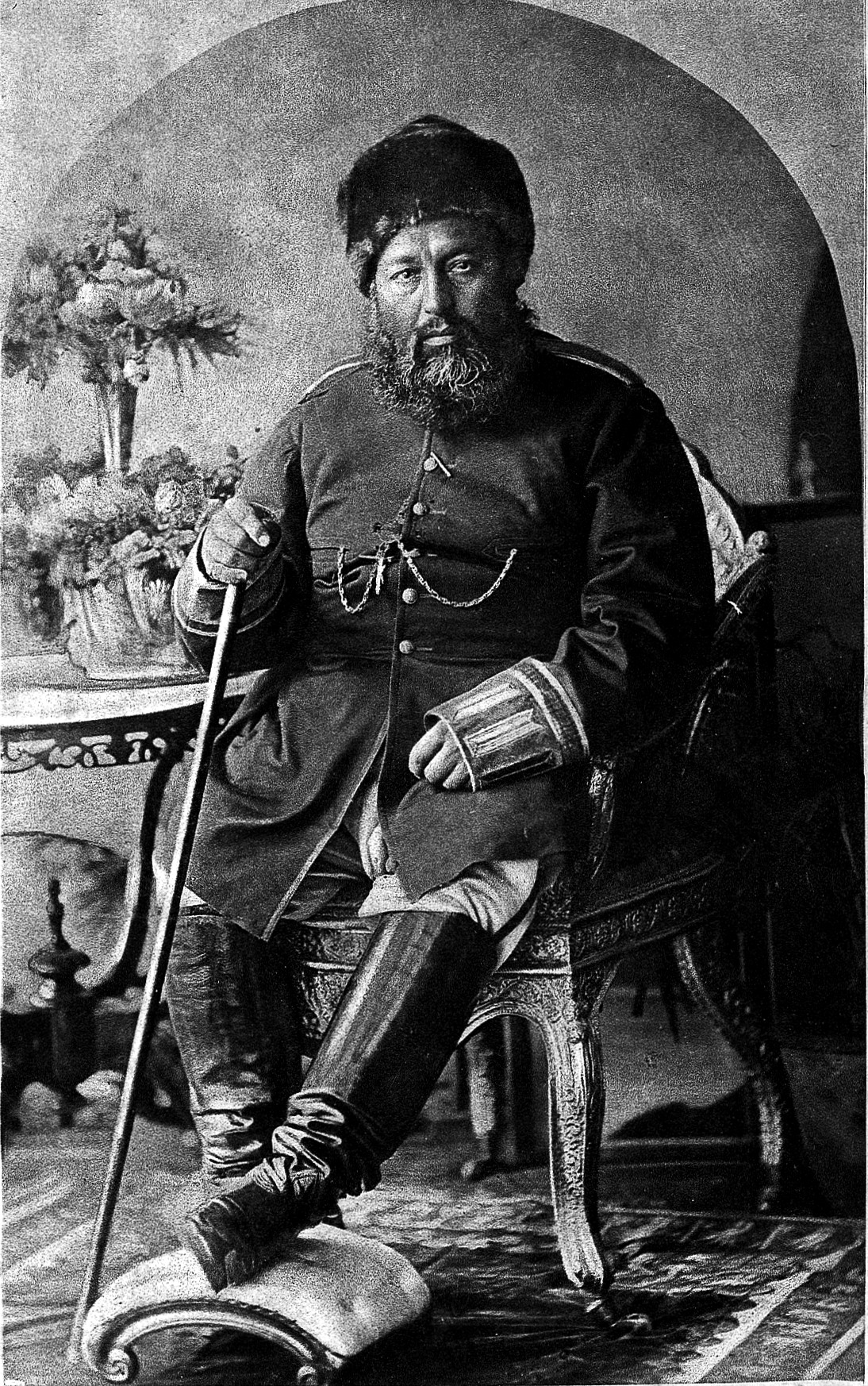
Abdur Rahman Khan in 1897

Abdur Rahman Khan's government was a military despotism resting upon a well-appointed army; it was administered through officials absolutely subservient to an inflexible will and controlled by a widespread system of espionage; while the exercise of his personal authority was too often stained by acts of unnecessary cruelty. He held open courts for the receipt of petitioners and the dispensation of justice; and in the disposal of business he was indefatigable.

In the 1880s, the "Iron Emir" decided to strategically displace some members of different ethnic groups in order to bring better security. For example, he "uprooted troublesome Durrani and Ghilzai Pashtun tribes and transported them to Uzbek and Tajik populated areas in the north, where they could spy on local Dari-speaking, non-Pashtun ethnic groups and act as a screen against further Russian encroachments on Afghan territory." From the end of 1888, the Amir spent eighteen months in his northern provinces bordering upon the Oxus, where he was engaged in pacifying the country that had been disturbed by revolts, and in punishing with a heavy hand all who were known or suspected to have taken any part in rebellion.

In 1895–1896, Abdur Rahman directed the invasion of Kafiristan and the conversion of its indigenous peoples to Islam. The region was subsequently renamed Nuristan. In 1896, he adopted the title of Zia-ul-Millat-Wa-ud Din ("Light of the nation and religion"), and his zeal for the cause of Islam induced him to publish treatises on jihad.

Chitral, Yarkand and Ferghana became shelters for refugees in 1887 and 1883 from Badakhshan who fled from the campaigns of Abdur Rahman.

=== Hazara genocide ===
In the early 1890s Hazaras revolted against Abdur Rahman. As the Kabul Newsletters written by the British agents indicate, Abdur Rahman was an extremely ruthless man. He has been called 'The Dracula Amir' by some writers. Due to Abdur Rahman's depredations, over 50–60 percent of the total Hazara population was massacred and numerous towers of Hazara heads were made from the defeated rebels. Upon each victory Abdur Rahman claimed, it unleashed a reign of terror. This resulted in Hazara women being forcibly married to Pashtuns, as well as Hazara territories, specifically in largely ethnic Hazara areas such as Urzugan, Ghazni, Maiden Shah, and Zawar being depopulated of Hazara populations. The territories of prominent Hazara chiefs in these areas were given to Mohammadzai sardars, or other closely related government loyalists. Alongside this, the Jizya tax was also enforced on Shias, which was only meant to be for non-Muslims. It caused some Hazaras to migrate to Quetta in Balochistan, and to Mashhad in northeastern Iran. In the Bamyan region, Abdur Rahman ordered soldiers to destroy the faces of the Buddhas of Bamiyan during a military campaign against a Hazara rebellion in the area.

== Political views ==
=== Authoritarian views ===
Abdur Rahman Khan had a special liking for statesmen with dictatorial tendencies. In his view "the world would produce but few politicians like William (Unknown if he meant Wilhelm I or Wilhelm II), the German Emperor, and Prince Bismarck, the Imperial Chancellor, he is today seen by some Afghans as the "Bismarck of Afghanistan, due his similar state building of a centralized state." He praised William Ewart Gladstone and Imperial Russia's prime minister (Unknown if he meant Michael von Reutern or Nikolai von Bunge) merely as good politicians. He had great contempt for liberal democracy where the opposition could speak its mind and could even come to power. In his opinion the "constitution of the British government was not good, as one time the Conservatives were in power, and at another the Liberals". Rahman also was a supporter of centralisation.

=== Economic views and economic policies ===
Under him a great deal of commerce was controlled by the government. During the reign of Amir ’Abd al-Rahman Khan, the transit trade, as well as Afghanistan's own internal and external trade, suffered greatly. Meanwhile, the government monopolized trade, advanced loans to merchants, and made trade safe from brigandage. Abdur Rahman Khan also was eager to develop the stature of government and the country's military capability, and so attempted to raise money by the imposition of state monopolies on the sale of commodities and high taxes. Various schemes were worked out for the collection of revenue. Ultimately, a system was developed that required taxpayers to pay their revenue themselves by a fixed date. The arrears were then collected by mounted troops. To meet the increasing expenses of the state, Amir ’Abd al-Rahman directed full attention to the system of taxation. He modified the old system by raising the existing rates of land revenue, introducing new taxes, and bringing rent-free lands under revenue. In addition, various kinds of existing taxes on cattle, households, and the like were increased, and new ones introduced. This slowed the long-term development of Afghanistan during that period. Western technologies and manufacturing methods were introduced at the command of the Afghan ruler, but in general only according to the logistical requirements of the growing army. To equip it he established factories where modern weapons were made. At the same time, he made use of the traditional feudal and tribal levies and attempted to arm the whole nation. An emphasis was placed on the manufacture of weapons and other military material. This process was in the hands of a small number of foreign experts invited to Kabul by the Afghan kings. Otherwise, it was not possible for non-Afghans, particularly westerners, to set up large-scale enterprises in Afghanistan during that period. He brought in foreign experts, imported machinery for making munitions, introduced manufacture of consumer goods and new agricultural tools, and established Afghanistan's first modern hospital.

== Death and descendants ==
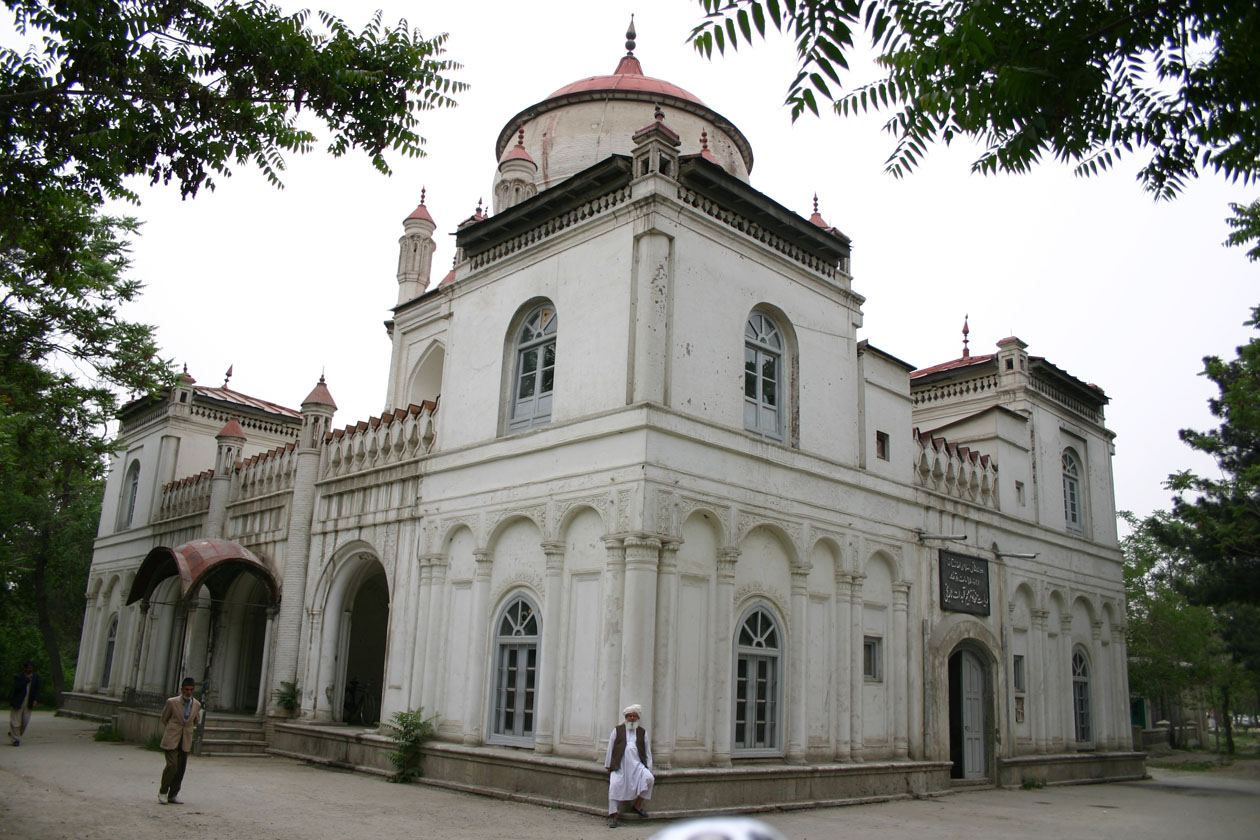
Site of Amir Abdur Rahman Khan's tomb, located in Zarnegar Park, Kabul.

Abdur Rahman died on 1 October 1901, inside his summer palace, being succeeded by his son Habibullah Khan who is the father of Amanullah Khan.

Today, his descendants can be found in many places outside Afghanistan, such as in America, France, Germany, and even in Scandinavian countries such as Denmark. His two eldest sons, Habibullah Khan and Nasrullah Khan, were born at Samarkand. His youngest son, Mahomed Omar Jan, was born in 1889 of an Afghan mother, namely Bibi Halima, was part of the Barakzai family. One of the Amir's grandchildren, Azizullah Khan Ziai was the ambassador of Iran from 1930 to 1932, he was the son of Nasrullah Khan.

== Legacy ==
Afghan society has mixed feelings about his rule. A majority of Pashtuns (his native ethnics) remember him as a ruler who initiated many programs for modernisation, and effectively prevented the country from being occupied by Russia by using the "financial and advisory" support of British Empire during the Great Game. The Emir was effectively dependent on British arms and money to stay in power.

To some historians he is called a tyrant, to other people he is a hero. But what did Abdul Rahman give us? He united Afghanistan under one king and one flag.

— Prince Abdul Ali Seraj (1945–2018), great-grandson of Abdur Rahman

== Honours and awards ==
- Honorary Grand Commander of the Most Exalted Order of the Star of India, 11 April 1885
- Honorary Grand Cross of the Most Honourable Order of the Bath (civil division), 29 December 1893

== Writings ==
- Pandnamah-i dunya va din (Advice on the worldly life and religion), 1883. Autobiography.
- Risalah-i Khirad’namah-i Amiri (Epistle of princely wisdom), 1886. On the notion of aql or intellect in Islam.
- Risalah-i najiyah, 1889. On the importance of jihad in the Qur'an and hadith.
- Taj al-Tavarikh (Crown of histories), 1904, Autobiography in 2 volumes.

== See also ==
- European influence in Afghanistan
- Lillias Hamilton (court physician to Abdur Rahman Khan in the 1890s)
- List of heads of state of Afghanistan
- Pashtun colonization of northern Afghanistan

== Notes ==
Regnal titles
Preceded by Ayub Khan	Barakzai dynasty Emir of Afghanistan; 31 May 1880 – 1 October 1901	Succeeded by Habibullah Khan
