= Nasrullah Khan (emir of Afghanistan) =

- Emir of Afghanistan; Commander of the Faithful (Note: Arabic: أمير المؤمنين, romanized: ʼAmīr al-Muʼminīn [ʔa.miːr‿ul.muʔ.mi.niːn]); Deputy of the Sultanate (Note: Arabic: نائب السلطنة, romanized: Nāʼib al-Sulṭanah [naː.ʔib‿ul.sul.tˤa.nah]); Pillar of the State (Note: Arabic: اعتماد الدولة, romanized: Iʻtimād al-Dawlah [ʔiʕ.ti.maːd‿ul.d̪aw.lah])
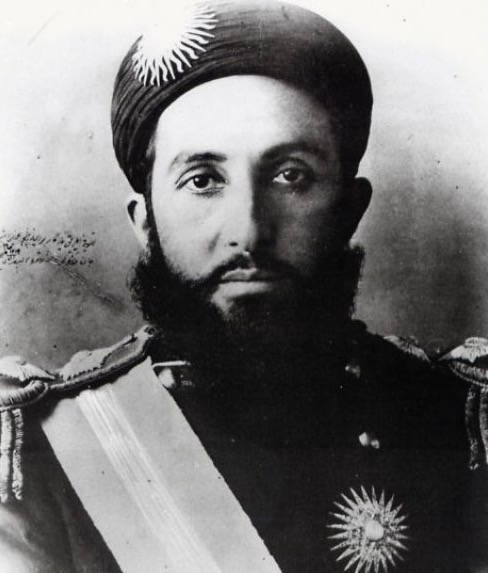
- Nasrullah Khan in 1919

Emir of Afghanistan
- Reign: 21 February 1919 – 28 February 1919
- Coronation: 21 February 1919; Jalalabad, Afghanistan
- Predecessor: Habibullah Khan
- Successor: Amanullah Khan
- Born: 7 April 1875; Samarkand, Russian Turkestan
- Died: 31 May 1920 (aged 45); Kabul, Emirate of Afghanistan
- Burial: Koh-e Asamai, Kabul, Afghanistan
- Spouse: 5 wives and 5 consorts: Bilqis Koko Jan Bilqis Begum A daughter of General Faramurz Khan Jahan Ara Begum Habiya Alia Begum Laila Begum Shirin Gulshan Marjan A Shighnani consort
- Issue: 11 sons and 15 daughters: Azizullah Khan Ziai Jamal ud-Din Khan Mohammad Akram Khan Mohammad Ghaffar Khan Saifullah Khan Ataullah Khan Nasser-Zia Azimullah Khan Ruhullah Khan Abdul Rauf Khan Ghulam Mohammad Khan Abdul Salim Khan Zainab Khanum Ruh Afza Khanum Hajira Sardar Begum Humaira Khanum I Siddiqa Khanum Ruqaiya Khanum Hafsa Khanum Azra Khanum Saleha Begum Humaira Khanum Amina Begum Hanifa Khanum Aliya Begum Aisha Begum Hamida Begum
- Father: Abdur Rahman Khan
- Mother: Asal Begum
- Military career
- Conflicts: 1919 Afghan coup d'état (POW)

Nasrullah Khan Barakzai (Note: Pashto: نصر الله خان بارکزی, romanized: Nasr Allāh Xān Bārakzai [nas.ɾu(l).lɑ(h) xɑn bɑ.ɾak.zaɪ]; Persian: نصر الله خان بارکزی, romanized: Nasr Allāh Khān Bārakzay [näsɾ‿ʊl.lɑ́ː(ʱ) xɑːn bɑː.ɾäk.záj]) GCMG (1874 – May 1920), sometimes spelt as Nasr Ullah Khan, was shahzada (crown prince) of Afghanistan and second son of Emir Abdur Rahman Khan. He held the throne of Afghanistan as Emir for one week, from 21 to 28 February 1919, until Habibullah's son Amanullah staged a coup against his uncle.

== Early life ==
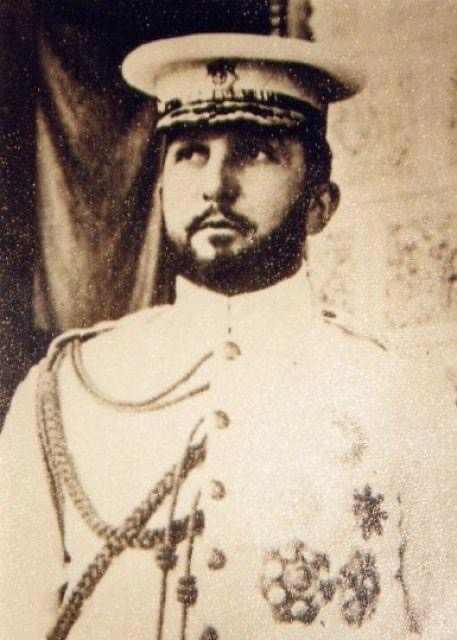
Prince and Marshal Nasrullah in his youth

Nasrullah was born to a Pashtun family in Samarkand in 1874, the second of three sons of Abdur Rahman Khan. His brothers were Habibullah Khan who was his elder brother and Mohammed Omar Khan. Nasrullah's birth occurred during a period in which his father Abdur Rahman Khan was living in exile in Russian Turkestan.

On 22 July 1880, Nasrullah's father was recognised as Emir following the end of British occupation of Afghanistan, on the condition that he align Afghanistan's foreign policy with that of Britain. As a consequence of his father's ascension of the throne, Nasrullah (and his elder brother Habibullah) became Shahzada (crown princes) of Afghanistan.

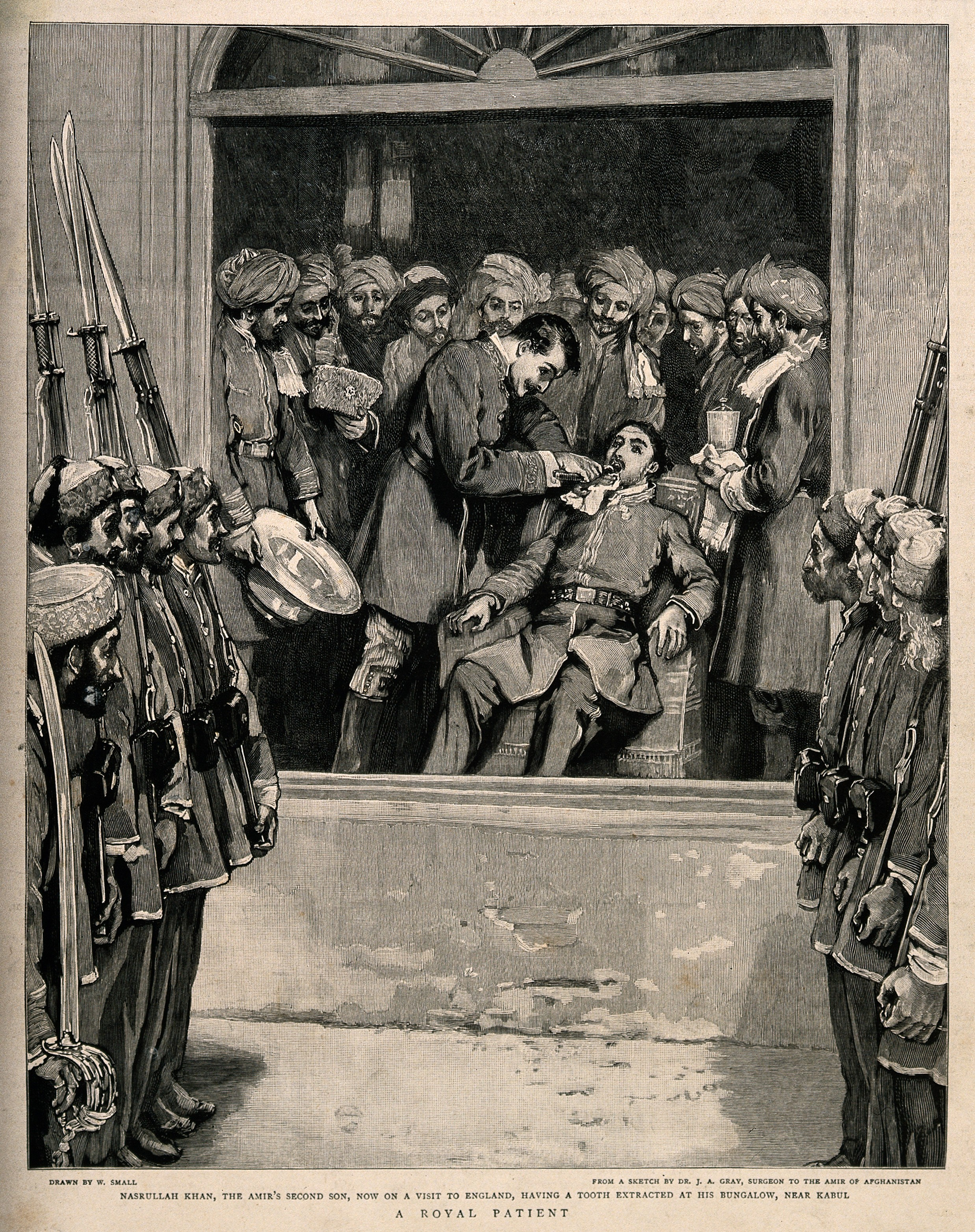
Nashrullah Khan during his father's reign having a tooth extracted in front of the soldiers of his father's army

== Visit to England ==
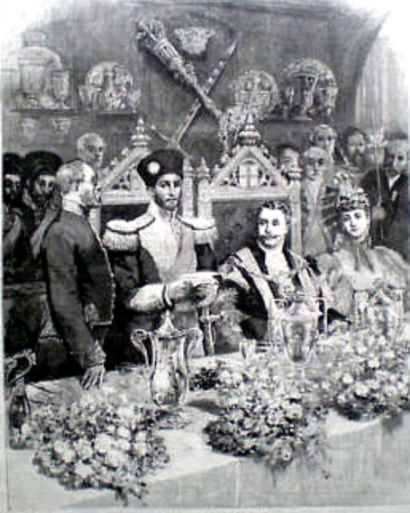
Prince Nasrullah with others

Prince Nasrullah meets Queen Victoria during his 1895 visit to England.

In 1895 the Emir Abdur Rahman Khan had intended to undertake a state visit to England to pay his respects to the ageing Queen Victoria. However, his health prevented him from making the trip, and so he instead sent his son the Shahzada Nasrullah Khan. Nasrullah departed Bombay on 29 April 1895, with an entourage of over 90 dignitaries, including "five or six" high-ranking Afghan nobles and a group of priests for the observance of religious functions. On 23 May the Shahzada landed at Portsmouth in England.

On 27 May 1895 the Shahzada was received by the Queen at Windsor. During his trip he also visited the Liverpool Overhead Railway, and went to Ascot, Glasgow, and the Elswick Company Gun Range at Blitterlees Banks, as well as staying with Lord Armstrong at Cragside. He made a gift of £2,500 to Abdullah Quilliam to support the work of the Liverpool Muslim Institute.

At the time of his visit, the Shahzada was 20 years of age. He reportedly did not speak English well, and did not make a good impression on the local press. A reporter from the Cumberland Pacquet described him as "a stolid, impassive, and greatly bored youth".

On 3 September 1895 he left England for Paris, and from Paris went on to Rome and Naples, and arrived in Karachi on 16 October 1895. He returned to Kabul through Quetta, Chaman and Kandahar. The National Geographic Magazine believed this to be the longest journey ever undertaken by an Afghan.

In 1895, Nasrullah and his brother Habibullah received the Knight Grand Cross of St Michael and St George from Queen Victoria in recognition of their services to the British Commonwealth.

== During Habibullah's reign ==
On 3 October 1901 Nasrullah's father Abdur Rahman died, aged 57, and Nasrullah's brother Habibullah peacefully ascended the throne of Afghanistan by right of primogeniture.

Prior to his death, Abdur Rahman had sought to totally subdue any sources of opposition to his reign and the stability of Afghanistan with strict laws and restrictions. Among those affected by Abdur Rahman's restrictions was the religious establishment. Upon Abdur Rahman's death, the religious establishment sought to regain its power, and saw in Nasrullah a potential ally. Nasrullah was by this stage deeply religious and had qualified as a Hafiz, or "Memorizer of the Qur'an", one who has memorised entire Quran. Throughout his adult life he advocated an Afghan policy strongly aligned with Islamic principles.

Recognising his brother as a potential contender for the throne, Habibullah went to lengths to placate and gain the support of Nasrullah. Upon Habibullah's succession to the throne he named Nasrullah commander-in-chief of the Afghan army, and also gave him the title of President of the State Council. Later in his reign, Habibullah named Nasrullah his heir to the throne in preference to Habibullah's own sons. By contrast, Nasrullah's younger brother Mohammed Omar Jan, and Mohammed's mother the Queen Dowager Bibi Hallima, both of whom were powerful political forces potentially of danger to Habibullah, were kept by Habibullah as "practically state prisoners" confined in private quarters under the guise of protection by a strong detachment of the Imperial Bodyguard (Mohammed Omar Jan having been stripped of his own personal bodyguard – and state positions – by Habibullah in 1904).

The level of influence Nasrullah enjoyed led Angus Hamilton in his 1910 book Afghanistan to describe Habibullah as a "weak-willed" ruler, and the possibility of Nasrullah making an attempt on the throne caused Hamilton to describe him as a "stormy petrel in the Afghan sea of domestic politics".

== Anti-British policy ==
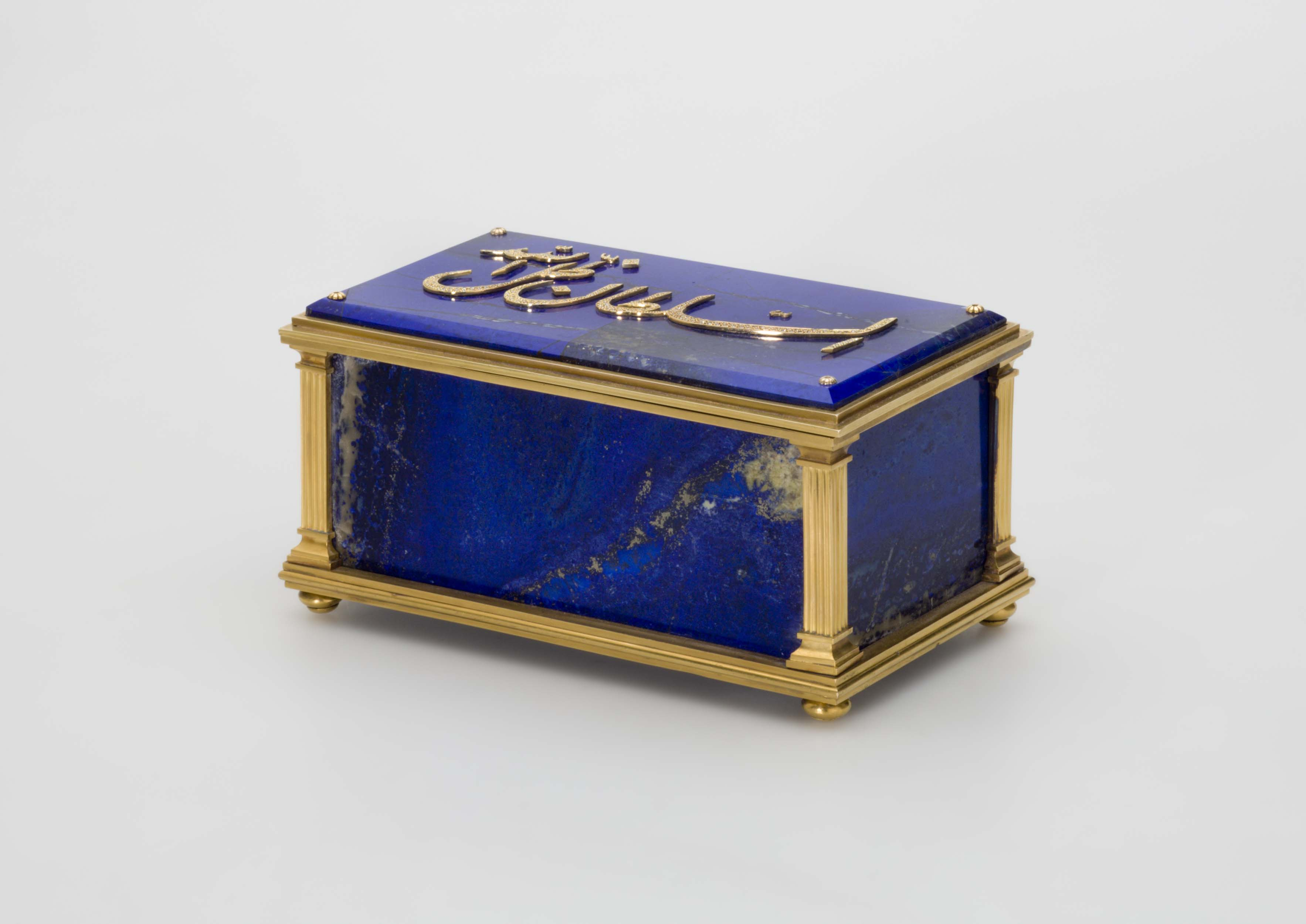
Lapis lazuli casket sent by Nasrullah Khan "in token of his personal friendship" to the Duke of Connaught

Despite his earlier trip to England, Nasrullah demonstrated little sympathy for British foreign policy towards Afghanistan.

When Abdul Rahman Khan took the throne of Afghanistan in 1880, he inherited the terms of the 1878 Treaty of Gandamak, which made Afghanistan a British protected state. The treaty, amongst other provisions, surrendered control over Afghan foreign relations to the British and allowed for a British mission, with European members, to reside in Kabul. Abdul Rahman Khan was able to alter the terms of the treaty to provide that all members of the British mission be Indian Muslims but was otherwise stuck with the treaty in its entirety.

The Treaty of Gandamak also required that Afghanistan sever its relationships with the independent tribes of the tribal regions of Afghanistan, those lying on the far side of the Durand Line. These tribes had previously been a substantial source of military power for the Afghanistan throne. When Habibullah became Emir he was pressured by the British government to ratify the Treaty of Gandamak and, although he did so by proclamation in 1905, he would not commit to withdraw Afghan influence from the British side of the Durand Line, or to sever Afghanistan's relationship with the tribes in that area.

The significance of the tribal areas was that they formed a natural military barrier against the British, who periodically threatened to invade the region to counter Russian advances from the north. Nasrullah Khan actively agitated his brother Habibullah to make use of Afghanistan's influence with the tribes to strengthen Afghanistan's position against the British, and at Nasrullah's urging Habibullah continue to pay allowances to the Durand Line tribes despite the Treaty of Gandamak.

At around the same time, during 1904–05, Sir Louis Dane (later governor of the Punjab region of India) attempted to establish a new British mission at Kabul in line with the terms of the Treaty. This was a plan which Nasrullah unsuccessfully opposed.

When the First World War broke out in 1914, the Young Afghan political movement, headed by journalist Mahmud Tarzi and Habibullah's son Amanullah, advocated that Afghanistan enter the war on the German-Turkish side, in direct opposition to Britain. In this they had the support of Nasrullah and the religious factions he represented, who were sympathetic towards the Ottomans because of what they saw as unwarranted infidel aggression towards Islamic states. Despite this, Emir Habibullah Khan judged Afghanistan too poor and weak to realistically take part in the war, and declared Afghanistan's neutrality, to the frustration of Nasrullah and the Young Afghans.

Nevertheless, Nasrullah actively used his political power to assist the German-Turkish efforts. When the Turko-German Niedermayer-Hentig expedition was welcomed to Kabul in 1915 (despite promises to the Viceroy of India that the expedition would be arrested), Nasrullah provided a friendly ear to the mission after Habibullah reaffirmed Afghanistan's neutrality. Nasrullah was involved in introducing the expedition to journalist Mahmud Tarzi, whose papers began taking an increasingly anti-British stance. He also continued to entreat the mission to remain in Kabul despite Habibullah's unwillingness to offer them a solid alliance. Finally in 1916 Nasrullah offered to remove Habibullah from power and take charge of the frontier tribes in a campaign against British India, but by then the mission realised such action would be fruitless and declined.

The Turko-German embassy withdrew in 1916, but not before it had convinced Habibullah that Afghanistan was an independent nation which should not remain beholden to the British. Following the closure of the World War, Habibullah petitioned the British for favours resulting from Afghanistan's alleged assistance to the British during the war. These favours included the recognition of Afghanistan's independence and a seat at the Versailles Peace Conference. Britain refused both these requests. Habibullah sought to open further negotiations but before these could progress he was assassinated.

== Succession and death ==
In February 1919, Emir Habibullah Khan went on a hunting trip to Afghanistan's Laghman Province. Among those in his retinue were Nasrullah Khan, Habibullah's first son Inayatullah, and Habibullah's commander-in-chief Nadir Khan. On the evening of 20 February 1919, Habibullah was assassinated in his tent by Shuja ud-Dawla, one of the pages who slept in his tent, on orders from his younger son, Amanullah, leaving Nasrullah the heir successor to the Afghan throne. Nasrullah at first refused to take the throne and declared his allegiance to Inayatullah, Habibullah's first born. Inayatullah refused and said that his father had made Nasrullah the heir rightfully and wanted him to become Emir. All the local tribes people also gave their allegiance to Nasrullah because of his strong religious beliefs.

The remainder of Habibullah's party journeyed south-east to Jalalabad, and on 21 February 1919 reached that city, whereupon Nasrullah was declared Emir, supported by Habibullah's first son Inayatullah.

Amanullah Khan, third son of Habibullah by Habibullah's first wife, received the news in Kabul where he had remained as the king's representative. Using this opportunity, he immediately seized control of the treasury at Kabul and staged a coup against his uncle. He took control of Kabul and the central government, declaring war against Nasrullah. Nasrullah did not want any bloodshed in order for him to be king. He told Amanullah that he can have the kingdom, and he will take exile in Saudi Arabia. Amanullah Khan swore upon the Quran that no harm would come to Nasrullah if he returned to Kabul and then he could do as he pleased. Fearing that Nasrullah's supporters would rise against Amanullah, the latter went against his word and imprisoned Nasrullah and his supporters. On 28 February 1919, Amanullah proclaimed himself Emir, and on 3 March 1919 Nasrullah was arrested by Amanullah's forces.

On 13 April 1919, Amanullah held a Durbar (a royal court under the supervision of Amanullah) in Kabul which inquired into the death of Habibullah. It found a colonel in the Afghanistan military guilty of the crime, and had him executed. On manufactured evidence, it found Nasrullah complicit in the assassination. He imprisoned Nasrullah to life imprisonment, and had him assassinated approximately one year later while in the royal jail.

== See also ==
- List of monarchs of Afghanistan

== Notes ==
Regnal titles
Preceded by Habibullah Khan	Emir of Afghanistan; 21 February 1919 – 28 February 1919	Succeeded by Amanullah Khan
