= Hamidullah Enayat Seraj =

Afghan politician and diplomat

Governor of Herat
- In office 1968–1971
- Monarch: Zahir Shah
- Preceded by: Muhammad Siddiq
- Succeeded by: Muhammad Ibrahim Abbasi

Ambassador of Afghanistan to India
- In office 1976–1978
- Monarch: Zahir Shah
- Preceded by: Abdul Zahir
- Succeeded by: Pacha Gul Wafadar

Ambassador of Afghanistan to Britain
- In office 1973–1974
- Monarch: Zahir Shah
- Preceded by: Zalmai Mahmood Ghazi
- Succeeded by: Abdul Rahman Pazhwak

Personal details
- Born: February 1917 Jalalabad, Afghanistan
- Died: 24 September 2009 (aged 92) Rome, Italy
- Spouse: 1
- Education: Industrial High School, Tehran

Hamidullah Enayat Seraj (born 1917, died 2007) was an Afghan civil servant and member of the Barakzai dynasty.

== Early life ==
Hamidullah Enayat Seraj was born in Jalalabad in February 1917. His father was Inayatullah Khan, who ruled Afghanistan for a period of three days in January 1929. His mother was Khariya, a daughter of Mahmud Tarzi and sister of Soraya Tarzi. Seraj had 12 siblings, four brothers and eight sisters. His uncle was Amanullah Khan (who later became his father-in-law) He undertook primary education in Afghanistan. In 1929, after his father abdicated, his family was exiled to Iran, during which point his father died in August 1946. The following year, Seraj returned with his family to Afghanistan. He received higher education during his exile in Iran at the Industrial High School. He also received his B.S degree in engineering at the University of Tehran in 1939.

== Career ==
In 1948, he became a member of the Ministry of Education and the following year, the Vice President of the general education department in the Ministry of Education. By 1951, he had joined the Nejat School (which employed mostly German teachers) and became the Acting principal there before eventually becoming the Principal in 1960. In 1971 he was made Minister of Education in the cabinet of Abdul Zahir. In 1972 (other sources give 1973) he became the Afghan Ambassador to Britain.

== Personal life ==
Seraj married Princess Abeda, one of the daughters of Amanullah Khan and Soraya Tarzi. Princess Abeda was married to Ali Wali before her marriage to Seraj. In 1978, Seraj moved to Italy, where he lived until his death in 2009.
