= Habibullah Khan =

Emir of Afghanistan from 1901 to 1919

- Commander of the Faithful (Note: Arabic: أمير المؤمنين, romanized: Amīr al-Muʼminīn [ʔa.miːr‿ul.muʔ.mi.niːn]); Lamp of the Nation and the Religion (Note: Arabic: سراج الملة و الدين, romanized: Sirāj al-Millah wa al-Dīn [si.raːd͡ʒ‿ul.mil.lah wa‿d̪.d̪iːn]); The Peerless Emir (Note: Persian: امیر بی‌نظیر, romanized: Amīr-i Bē-nazīr [ʔä.míː.ɾɪ beː.nä.zíːɾ])
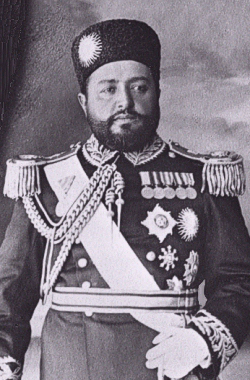
- Formal portrait, c. 1901–1919

Emir of Afghanistan
- Reign: 1 October 1901 – 20 February 1919
- Predecessor: Abdur Rahman Khan
- Successor: Nasrullah Khan
- Born: 2 July 1872; Samarkand, Emirate of Bukhara
- Died: 20 February 1919 (aged 46); Kalagosh, Emirate of Afghanistan
- Spouse: 11 wives and 34 consorts: Jamal Begum Wazir Begum (div.) Sarwar Sultana Begum Zahra Begum A daughter of Mir Sora Beg Kolabi A Chitrali consort A daughter of Akbar Khan Mohmand Mahbuba Begum Zarin Taj Adeko Begum (div.) Begum Jan Zarin Begum Zamarud Begum Khairbanu Begum Sandal Begum Yasmin Begum Maimuna Begum Mehri Begum Jan Sultana Begum Yasmin Begum Banafsha Begum Hakima Begum Shukufa Begum Nilum Begum Maryam Begum Neqadam Begum Basu Begum Mamlakat Begum Rabili Begum Shabo Begum Sanawbar Begum Sawar Begum Gulchara Begum Sitara Begum Sultanat Begum Kawik Begum Amshahi Begum Bulbul Begum Astani Begum Unnamed Hazari consort Shamshad Begum Mar Jan Begum Wasi-i Khurd Wasi-i-Kalan
- Issue: 29 sons and 38 daughters: Inayatullah Khan Hayatullah Khan Amanullah Khan Mohammad Ayub Khan Mohammad Kabir Khan Hidayatullah Khan Abdul Majid Khan Ahmad Ali Khan Sardar Asadullah Khan Seraj Ubaidu’llah Khan Ghulam Haidar Khan Ghulam Mohammad Khan Mohammad Ali Khan Abdullah Khan Seraj Mohammad Amin Khan Abdul Karim Khan Siraj Abdul Sami Khan Seraj Mohammad Faruq Khan Hashmatullah Khan Abdul Shakur Khan Abdul Wajir Khan Abdul Ghafur Ghafur Khan Seraj Abdul Wahab Khan Mohammad Aziz Seraj Abdul Wahid Khan Abdul Satar Khan Abdul Fattah Khan Abdul Wasi Khan Abdul Samad Khan H.R.H. Princess Afaq Sultan Begum Safura Begum Sahira Begum Safia Begum Mamlakat Khanum Razia Begum Aisha Khanum Zahra Begum Khawar Khanum Gauhar Begum Shah Jahan Begum Farukh Taj Begum Hawa Begum Rabia Begum I Hanifa Begum Rabia Begum II Maliha Begum Aisha Khanum Uzra Begum Saleha Begum Rahima Begum Aziza Begum Sharifa Begum Aqila Jan Begum Shafiqa Begum Shah Gul Jahan Farukh Begum Habiba Begum Karima Begum Khadija Begum Kamila Begum Fatima Khanum
- Dynasty: Barakzai dynasty
- Father: Abdur Rahman Khan
- Mother: Asal Begum
- Religion: Sunni Islam

Habibullah Khan Barakzai (Note: Pashto: حبيب الله خان بارکزی, romanized: Habib Allāh Xān Bārakzai [(h)a.bi.bu(l).lɑ(h) xɑn bɑ.ɾak.zaɪ]; Persian: حبیب الله خان بارکزی, romanized: Habīb Allāh Khān Bārakzay [(h)ä.bíːb‿ʊl.lɑ́ː(ʱ) xɑːn bɑː.ɾäk.záj]) GCB GCMG (2 July 1872 – 20 February 1919) was the Emir of Afghanistan from 1901 until his assassination in 1919 by Shuja al-Dawla Ghorbandi. He was the eldest son of the Emir Abdur Rahman Khan, whom he succeeded by right of primogeniture in October 1901. His grandfather was Mohammad Afzal Khan.

== Early life ==
Habibullah was the eldest son of Emir Abdur Rahman, and was born in Samarkand, Uzbekistan to a Pashtun family in 1872.

== Reign ==
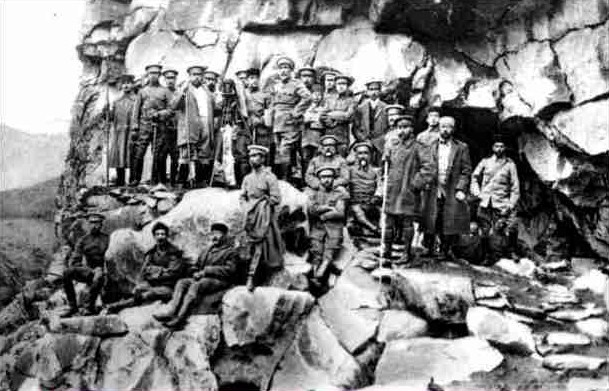
King Habibullah Khan with Afghan soldiers

Habibullah was a relatively reform-minded ruler who attempted to modernize his country. During his reign he worked to bring modern medicine and other technology to Afghanistan. Many people who were forced into exile by his father were returned to Afghanistan by a general amnesty decreed by Habibullah. In 1901, Habibullah passed a law forcing Hindu men to wear yellow turbans and women to wear a yellow veil in public in order to distinguish them from Muslims and to discriminate against them. In 1903, Habibullah founded the Habibia High School, as well as a military academy. He also worked to put in place progressive reforms in his country. He instituted various legal reforms and repealed many of the harshest criminal penalties. One of his chief advisers, Abdul Latif was sentenced to death in 1903 for apostasy, being stoned to death in Kabul. Other reforms included the dismantling of the internal intelligence organization that had been put in place by his father. Qala-e-Seraj in Mihtarlam was built by Habibullah in c. 1912–13 to spend his winters.

=== 1909 Crackdown on the Constitutional Movement (Mashrutiyat) ===
In March 1909, the Afghan constitutionalist (Mashrutiyat) movement, a coalition of Islamic scholars (ulama), educators, and intellectuals petitioned Habibullah, demanding the transition from absolute monarchy to a constitutional monarchy. Penned by the scholar Sarwar Wasif, the petition functioned as the core manifesto of the Mashrutiyat movement. Viewing it as a threat to his authority, Habibullah accused the signatories of conspiring to assassinate him, subsequently executing seven leaders and imprisoning the remaining members.

=== Khost rebellion ===
In May 1912, Habibullah faced the only crisis in his career when a rebellion, known as the Khost rebellion, erupted in Khost led by Jehandad Khan, a rival claimant to the Afghan throne. This rebellion ended in August that same year, when the rebels were given concessions by the Afghan government.

=== World War I ===
Habibullah maintained the country's neutrality in World War I, despite strenuous efforts by the Sultan of the Ottoman Empire and a German military mission (Niedermayer–Hentig Expedition) to enlist Afghanistan on its side. He also greatly reduced tensions with British India, signing a treaty of friendship in 1905 and paying an official state visit in 1907. While in India, he was initiated into Freemasonry, at Lodge Concordia, No. 3102.

== Assassination ==
In the summer of 1918, an ultimatum was sent to Habibullah. The ultimatum demanded the formation of a constitutional government and was followed by a threat, which was disregarded. During prepared celebrations for his birthday, Habibullah was shot at while driving through the Shor Bazaar in Kabul. However, the bullet only hit the car he was driving in. Habibullah requested Mustufi Husain Khan to find the assailants, and utilized this attempt to remove political dissenters and reformers against his government. Mustufi Husain identified numerous people, including associates of Mahmud Tarzi such as AbdulRahman Ludin, and AbdulHadi Dawai. Mustufi Husain also identified Habibullah's son, Amanullah Khan as being involved. This was, however, disregarded entirely. With the winter of 1918—1919 approaching, as well as a Spanish flu outbreak in Kabul, Habibullah retreated to his winter quarters in Jalalabad, leaving Amanullah Khan regent in Kabul as he left. In January 1919, Habibullah embarked on a hunt, and arrived in Kalagosh, an area in the province of Laghman. During the night of 19 February 1919, a military officer and close friend of Amanullah Khan, Shuja-ud-Daula Ghourbandi, managed to avoid Habibullah's bodyguards, and shot him through the ear at very close range, killing him.

Habibullah's brother Nasrullah Khan briefly succeeded him as Emir and held power for a week between 21 and 28 February 1919 before being ousted and imprisoned by Amanullah Khan, Habibullah's third son. This occurred a few months before the Third Anglo-Afghan War.

== Honours ==
- Knight Grand Cross of the Order of St Michael and St George (GCMG) – 1896
- Knight Grand Cross of the Order of the Bath (GCB) – 1907

== Bibliography ==
- Vogelsang, Willem (2001), The Afghans, Wiley, ISBN 978-0-631-19841-3

Regnal titles
Preceded by Abdur Rahman Khan	Barakzai dynasty Emir of Afghanistan; 1901–1919	Succeeded by Nasrullah Khan
