= Char Bagh =

Area in Laghman Province, Afghanistan

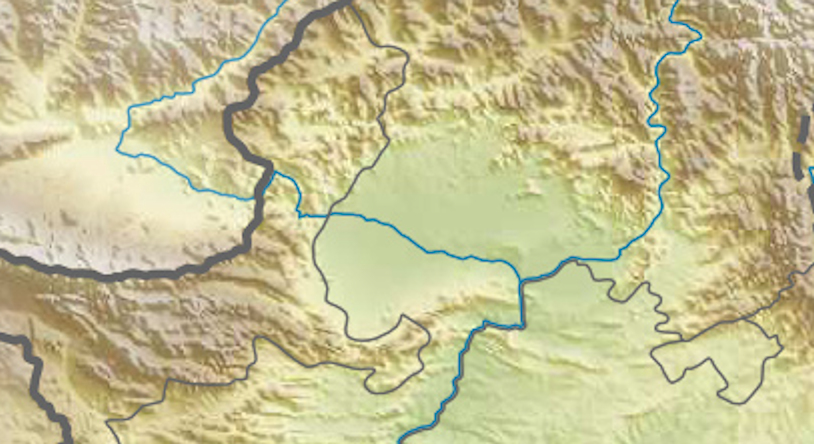
- Location in Gandhara Char Bagh (Afghanistan)
- 34°31′54″N 70°17′23″E

Char Bagh is an area within Laghman Province, Afghanistan, and is observable from the Jalalabad-Kabul Road.

== History ==
According to some sources, when Alexander the Great entered the region, he built a town between Char Bagh and Mandrawar after the Greek god of victory.

== See also ==
- Cophen campaign
