= Amanullah Khan =

Leader of Afghanistan from 1919 to 1929

- King of Afghanistan; Ghazi
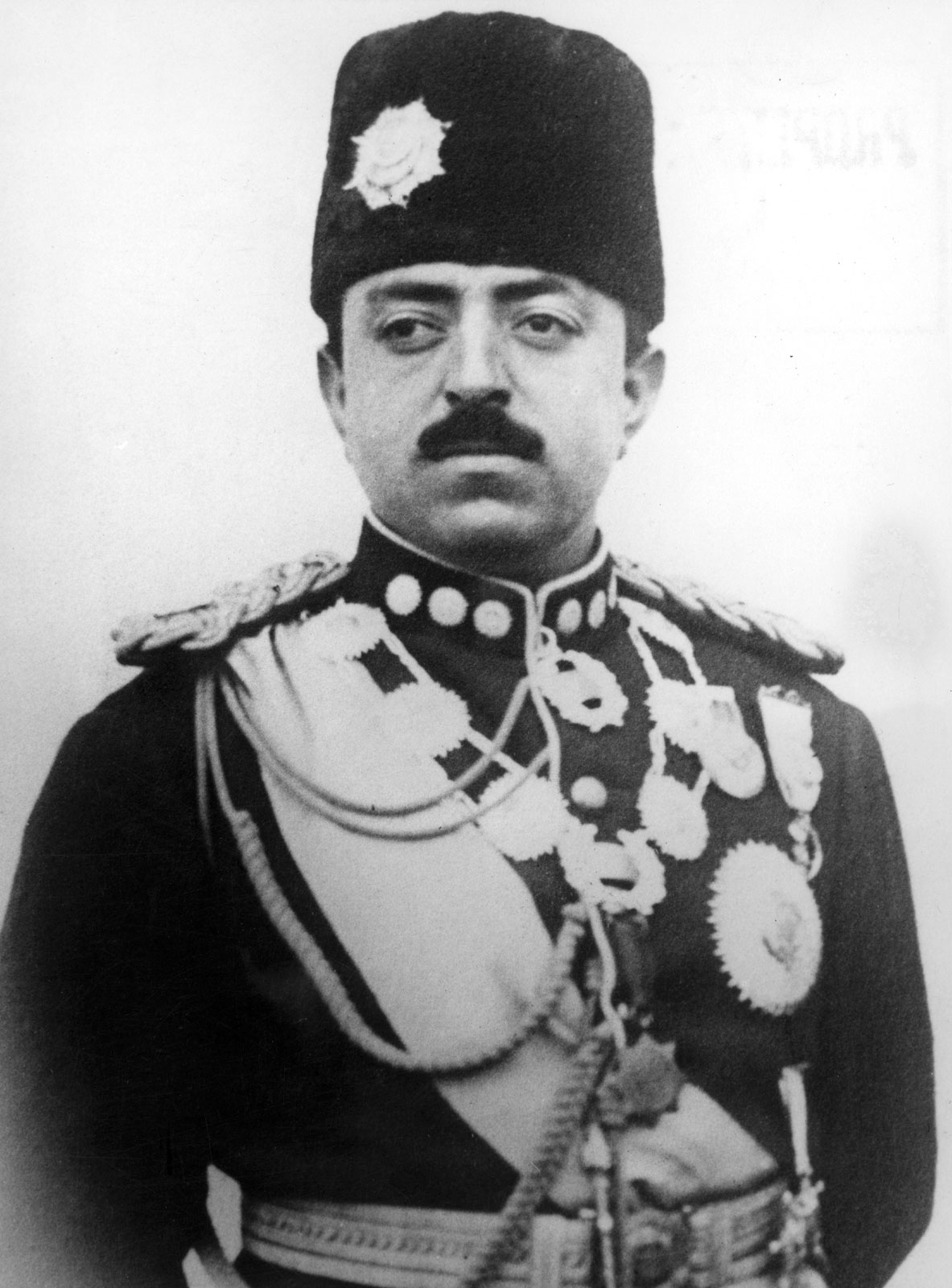

King of Afghanistan
- Reign: 9 June 1926 – 14 January 1929
- Predecessor: Himself (as Emir)
- Successor: Inayatullah Khan

Emir of Afghanistan
- Reign: 28 February 1919 – 9 June 1926
- Predecessor: Nasrullah Khan
- Successor: Himself (as King)
- Born: 1 June 1892; Paghman, Emirate of Afghanistan
- Died: 26 April 1960 (aged 67); Zurich, Switzerland
- Burial: Jalalabad, Afghanistan
- Spouse: Soraya Tarzi
- Issue: See: Princess Ameenah Shah Princess Abedah Princess Meliha Crown Prince Rahmatullah of Afghanistan Prince Saifullah Prince Hymayatullah Princess Adeela Prince Ehsanullah Princess India Princess Nagia
- House: Barakzai
- Father: Prince Habibullah I, Prince of Afghanistan
- Mother: Sarwar Sultana Begum
- Tughra
- Military career
- Conflicts: 1919 Afghan coup d'état: Third Anglo-Afghan War; Battle of Bagh; Second Battle of Bagh; Battle of Stonehedge Ridge; Skirmishes at Quetta; Skirmishes at the Zhob Valley; Skirmishes at Kurram; Skirmishes at the Chitral Valley; Capture of Spin Boldak; Battle of Thal; Alizai rebellion of 1923; Khost rebellion (1924–1925); Urtatagai conflict (1925–1926): Afghan Civil War (1928–1929); Siege of Jalalabad (1928–1929); Siege of Jabal al-Siraj; First Battle of Kabul; Siege of Murad Beg Fort; Battle of Moqor

Ghazi Amanullah Khan Barakzai (Note: Pashto: امان الله خان, romanized: Amān Allāh Xān [ʔa.mɑ.nu(l).lɑ(h) xɑn bɑ.ɾak.zaɪ]; Persian: امان الله خان, romanized: Amān Allāh Xān [ʔä.mɑːn‿ʊl.lɑ́ː(ʱ) xɑːn bɑː.ɾäk.záj]) (1 June 1892 – 26 April 1960) was Emir of Afghanistan from 1919 to 1926, and then King of Afghanistan from 1926 until his abdication in 1929. After the end of the Third Anglo-Afghan War in August 1919, Afghanistan was able to relinquish its protected state status to proclaim independence and pursue an independent foreign policy free from the influence of the United Kingdom.

Amanullah's rule was marked by dramatic political and social change, including attempts to modernize Afghanistan along Western lines. He did not fully succeed in achieving this objective due to an uprising by Habibullah Kalakani and his followers. On 14 January 1929, Amanullah abdicated and fled to neighbouring British India as the Afghan Civil War began to escalate. From British India, he went to Europe, where after 30 years in exile, he died in Zürich, Switzerland, on 26 April 1960. His body was brought to Afghanistan and buried in Jalalabad near his father Habibullah Khan's tomb.

== Early years ==
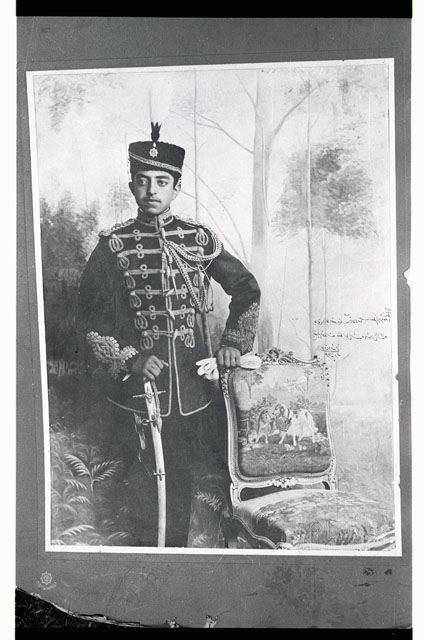
Amanullah at a young age

Amanullah Khan was born on 1 June 1892, in Paghman near Kabul, Afghanistan to a Pashtun family. He was the favoured and the third son of the Emir Habibullah Khan from his second wife. Amanullah was installed as the governor of Kabul, and was in control of the army and the treasury. He gained the allegiance of most of the tribal leaders.

In February 1919, Emir Habibullah Khan went on a hunting trip to Afghanistan's Laghman Province. Among those in his retinue were his brother Nasrullah Khan, Habibullah's first son from his first wife Inayatullah, and Habibullah's commander-in-chief Nadir Khan. On the evening of 20 February 1919, Habibullah was shot in the head by an unknown assassin while sleeping in his tent. Amanullah Khan would later become king in March 1919, leaving Nasrullah as successor to the Afghan throne. Nasrullah at first refused to take the throne and declared his allegiance to his nephew Inayatullah, Habibullah's first-born son from his first wife. Inayatullah refused and said that his father had made his uncle Nasrullah the rightful heir and wanted him to become Emir. All the local tribespeople gave their allegiance to Nasrullah, who was a pious and religious man.

The remainder of Habibullah's party journeyed southeast to Jalalabad, and on 21 February 1919 reached the city, where Nasrullah was declared Emir, supported by Habibullah's first son Inayatullah.

Amanullah Khan, third son of Habibullah by Habibullah's second wife, had remained in Kabul as the king's representative. Upon receiving the news of his father's death, Amanullah immediately seized control of the treasury at Kabul and staged a coup against his uncle. He took control of Kabul and the central government, declaring war against Nasrullah. Nasrullah did not want any bloodshed in order for him to be king. He told Amanullah that he could have the kingdom, and he would go into exile in Saudi Arabia. Amanullah Khan swore upon the Quran that no harm would come to Nasrullah if he returned to Kabul and then he could do as he pleased. On 28 February 1919, Amanullah proclaimed himself Emir. On 3 March 1919, fearing that Nasrullah's supporters would rise against Amanullah, he subsequently went against his word. Nasrullah was arrested and imprisoned by Amanullah's forces.

On 13 April 1919, Amanullah held a Durbar (a royal court under the supervision of Amanullah) in Kabul which inquired into the death of Habibullah. It found a colonel in the Afghanistan military guilty of the crime, and had him executed. On manufactured evidence, it found Nasrullah complicit in the assassination. Nasrullah was sentenced to life imprisonment but Amanullah had him assassinated approximately one year later while being held in the royal jail.

Russia had recently undergone its Communist revolution leading to strained relations between the country and the United Kingdom. Amanullah Khan recognized the opportunity to use the situation to gain Afghanistan's independence over its foreign affairs. He led a surprise attack against the British in India on 3 May 1919, beginning the Third Anglo-Afghan war. After initial successes, the war quickly became a stalemate as the United Kingdom was still dealing with the costs of World War I. An armistice was reached towards the end of 1919, which led to Afghanistan being freed of British diplomatic influence.

== Reforms ==
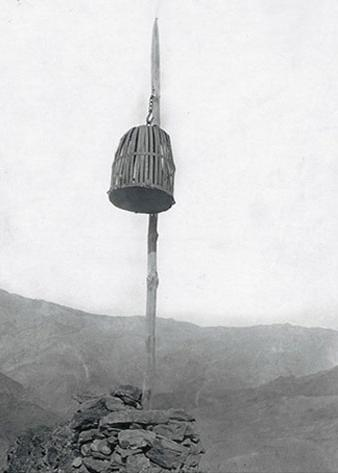
By 1921, banditry was dramatically curtailed in Afghanistan by harsh punishment, such as being imprisoned in suspended cages and left to die.

=== Administrative and political reforms ===
Amanullah conceptualized a modernist constitution that incorporated equal rights and individual freedoms, with the guidance of his father-in-law and Foreign Minister Mahmud Tarzi. To ensure national unity based on equal rights for all people before the law, and their participation in the political development of the country, he drafted the country's first constitution, the "Statute of the Supreme Government of Afghanistan", which was officially approved and ratified by 872 tribal elders and government officials gathered in a Loya Jirga in Jalalabad on 11 April 1922. Under Sharia law and government-enacted legislation, all citizens were entitled to equal rights and freedoms, according to Article 16 of the constitution.

=== Education and literature ===
Amanullah enjoyed early popularity within Afghanistan and he used his influence to modernise the country. Amanullah created new more cosmopolitan schools for both boys and girls in the regions and overturned centuries-old traditions such as strict dress codes for women. Various educational facilities, such as the Telegraph School, the Arabic Learning Academy or Daruloloom, Mastoorat School, Rashidya School in Jalalabad, Kandahar, and Mazar-e-sharif, Qataghan School, and the Academy of Basic Medical Sciences, as well as more than 320 schools, were established across all provinces. These schools initially had Indian instructors who were then replaced by French teachers. Primary education became obligatory, and literacy courses were developed to foster and improve reading abilities. Later, courses for teaching religious subjects and modern sciences were developed, with Amanullah Khan himself teaching some of them.

Despite Dari being the official language, the Pashto language was promoted as an important aspect of Afghan identity by Amanullah Khan. By the 1930s, a campaign had begun with the intention of making Pashto the Afghan government's official language. Pashto was declared an official language in 1936, and this was reaffirmed in 1964.

=== Cultural reforms ===
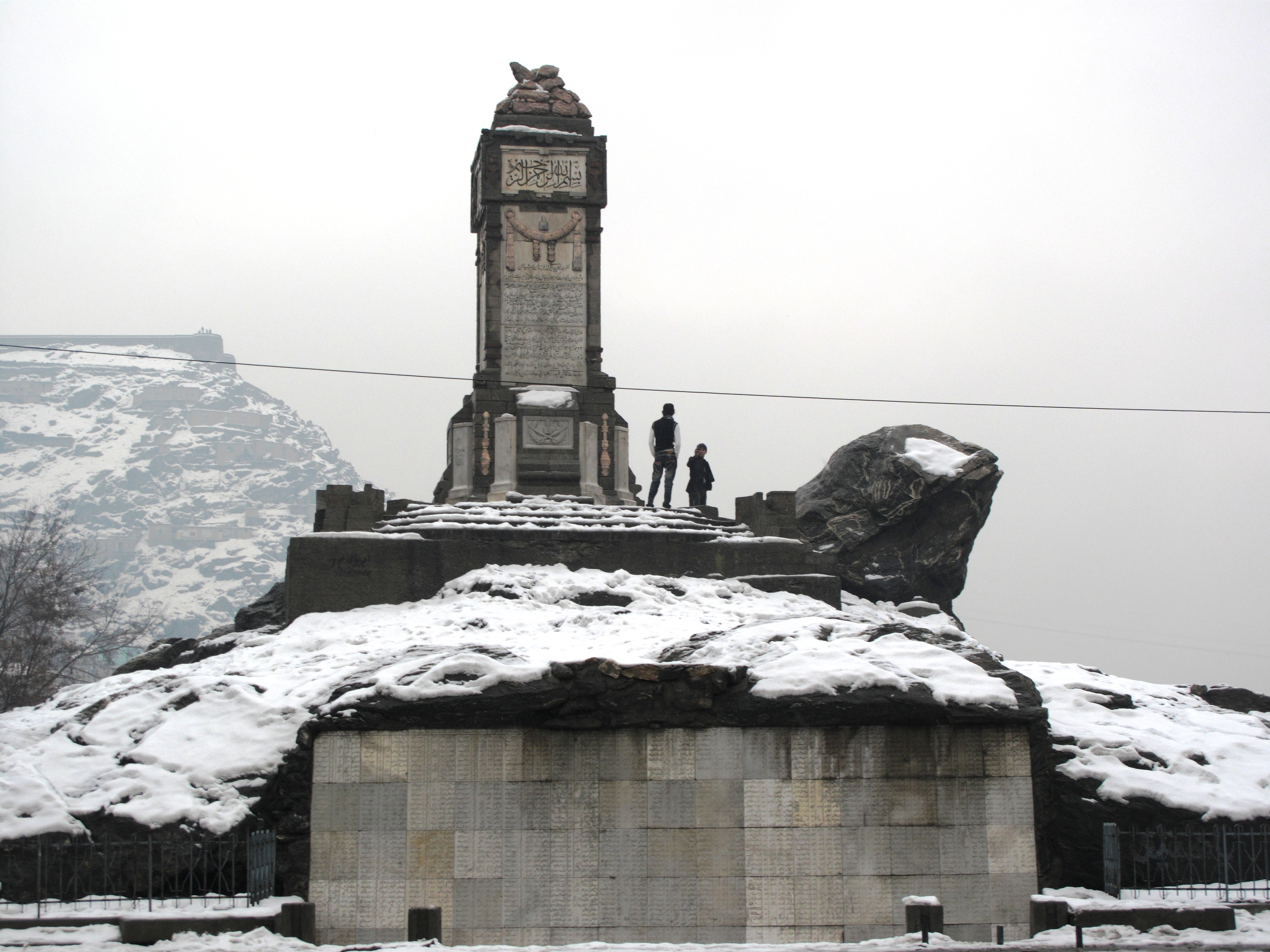
The Minar-e-Elm-wa-Jahil (Minaret of Knowledge and Ignorance) erected in Kabul by Amanullah Khan to commemorate the victory over the Khost rebellion of 1924-1925.

Amanullah's wife, Queen Soraya Tarzi, played a significant role regarding his policy towards women. This rapid modernisation created a backlash and a reactionary uprising known as the Khost rebellion which was suppressed in 1925. Amanullah met with many followers of the Baháʼí Faith in India and Europe, from where he brought back books that are still to be found in the Kabul Library. This association later served as one of the accusations against him when he was overthrown.

The failure of Amanullah Khan's reforms, like that of any other major political phenomena, was the result of a complex set of internal and external variables, some of which were objective in origin and others of which were linked to secret service organisations operating outside the country's borders. On the one hand, objective reasons arose from existing tensions between the changes being implemented and the interests of society's ruling class. At the time, Afghanistan's foreign policy was primarily concerned with the rivalry between the Soviet Union and the United Kingdom, the so-called Great Game. Each attempted to gain influence in Afghanistan and foil attempts by the other power to gain influence in the region. This effect was inconsistent, but generally favourable for Afghanistan; Amanullah established a limited Afghan Air Force consisting of donated Soviet planes.

Amanullah's government also accepted a close relationship with Turkestan. This included leaders like the King of Bukhara (Amir Seyyid Alem), to whom he provided military assistance. Amanullah's government also established a relationship with Enver Pasha. This relationship angered the Soviet Union despite both of the former mentioned subjects being defeated.

== Visit to Europe ==
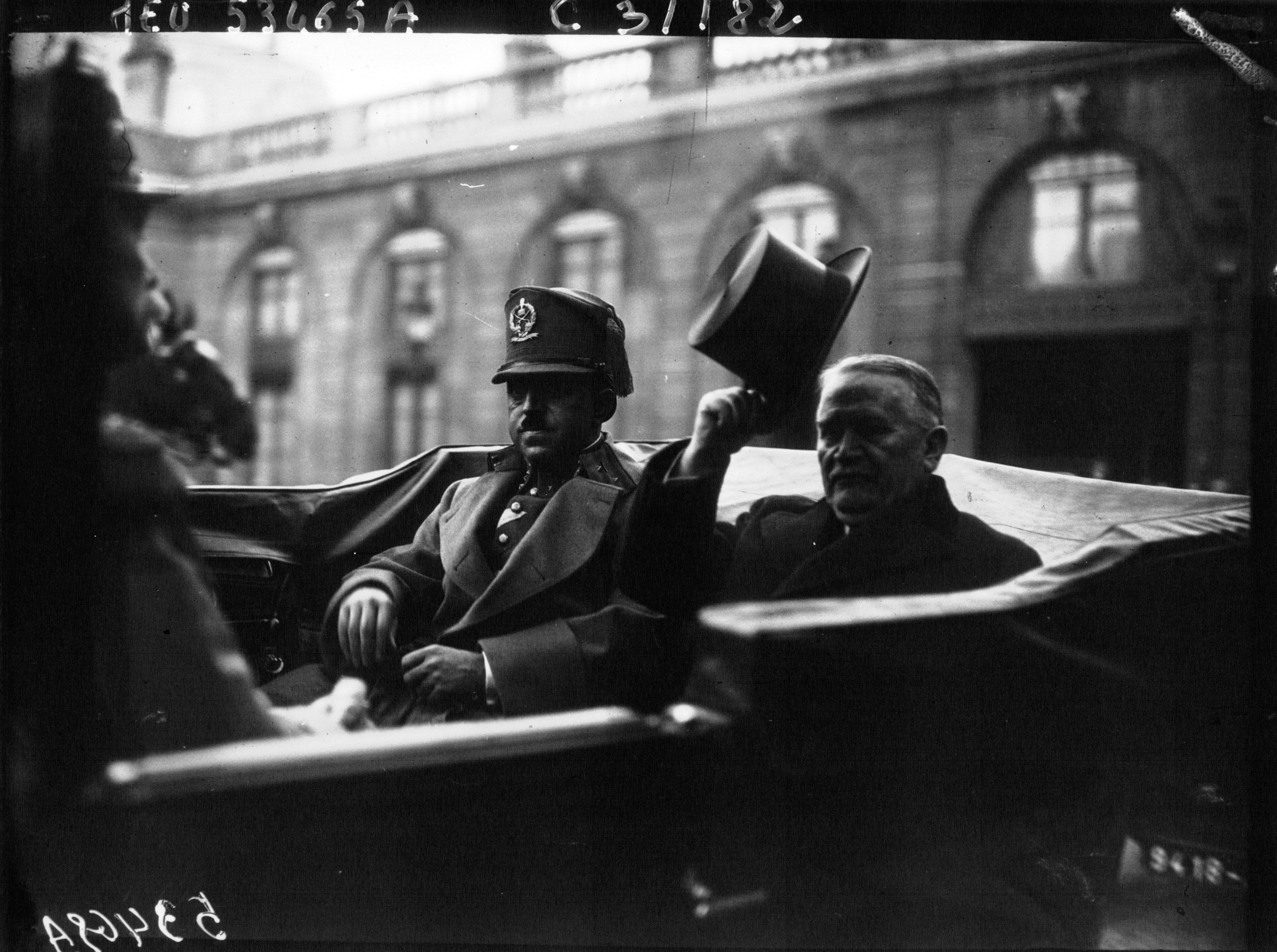
Amānullāh Khān with French president Gaston Doumergue in Paris, (January 1928).

Amanullah travelled to Europe in late 1927. The Afghan King and Queen set out from the port of Karachi and en-route they met with King Fuad of Egypt in Cairo. They undertook a whirlwind European visit: Italy (arrived 8 January 1928), where they met with King Victor-Emanuel III of Italy along with his Prime Minister, Benito Mussolini and then Pope Pius XI in the Vatican City; France, (arrived in Nice on 22 January 1928 and then Paris on 25 January), meeting with President Doumergue; Belgium, (arrived in Brussels on 8 February), meeting with King Albert I and Queen Elisabeth of Belgium. The next stop was Germany. The germanophile king arrived in Berlin on 22 February and met with President Paul von Hindenburg the same day.

Amanullah Khan with Hindenburg during his visit to Berlin, (February 1928).

He travelled to Great Britain as guests of King George V and Queen Mary. The steam ship SS Maid of Orleans arrived in Dover on 13 March 1928. The royal couple left England on 5 April and made their way to Poland. On their way, they had a longer stopover in Berlin where the Amanullah underwent an emergency tonsillectomy. The royal train with the King back on board arrived in the Polish border town of Zbąszyń on 28 April. The next day it pulled into Warsaw to be met by Polish ministers, the speaker of the Sejm and the country's president Ignacy Mościcki. At his request Amanullah was granted an audience with the First Marshal of Poland Józef Piłsudski. The Afghan party departed from Warsaw travelling east across the country to the border with the Soviet Union on 2 May 1928.

Amanullah Khan with Atatürk in a boat during his visit to Turkey (May 1928).

Finally Amanullah Khan visited the first Turkish president Mustafa Kemal Atatürk on 20 May 1928 which at the time was the first state visit by a foreign Head of State to Turkey. During this visit, Turkey signed its first technical assistant agreement with Afghanistan.

== Civil war ==
During and after Amanullah's visit to Europe, opposition to his rule increased to the point where an uprising in Jalalabad culminated in a march to the capital, and much of the army deserted instead of resisting. This was caused by Amanullah's new policies of rapid modernisation after returning from his tour of Europe in a still very conservative society. Some of his new policies (inspired by Mustafa Kemal Atatürk's revolution who however had advised him to be moderate and careful in his reforms during his visit to Turkey in 1928) included the abolishment of the veil, changing Friday, which is a weekend and sacred day of worship in Islamic countries, to a working day and making Thursday a non-working day instead. He also ordered people to replace their traditional Afghan attire with new western clothes (at a time when majority of the people could only afford with difficulty the basic necessities like food) and to tip their hats when greeting others like in Western countries. As a result, Islamic conservatives and opponents led by Habibullāh Kalakāni rose up against his rule and new western inspired modernisation policies.

Ex-King Amanullah Khan in Afghan native dress and holding a rifle in 1929.

On 14 December 1928 Kalakāni, a leader of the "Saqqawists" opposition movement accompanied by groups of Kohistanis, led an attack on Kabul, which was repelled after nine days of fighting and retreated to Paghman. He launched another attack on 7 January 1929 and successfully took Kabul. On 14 January 1929 Amanullah abdicated and went into temporary exile in then British India passing the monarchy to his half brother Inayatullah Khan who became the next king of Afghanistan until surrendering the Arg four days later on 18 January 1929 to Kalakani who proclaimed himself as Amir of Afghanistan.

Much of the resistance in support of Amanullah was confined to just one of the five "culture zones." The impacted area was a small "tribal zone" that encompassed the Eastern and Southern provinces (Mashreqi and Jonub) in 1929, as well as the modern provinces of Nangarhar, Laghman, Kunar, Paktiya, and Paktika. The Shinwari, Mohmand, Kakar, Mangal, Jaji, Ahmadzai, Safi, Ghilzai, along with other Pashtun tribes populate most of this area. Hazarajat's Shi'a Hazarahs were strong supporters of Amanullah's reforms and hence resisted the Kalakāni's rule. Large portions of the country were not involved in either of the violent conflicts.

While Amanullah was in India, Kalakani battled anti-Saqqawist tribes. Around 22 March 1929, Amanullah returned to Afghanistan assembling forces in Kandahar to reach Kabul and to dispose of Kalakāni. In April 1929 he attempted to advance to Kabul but his forces were defeated in Muqur, Ghazni and on 23 May 1929 he fled to India again. He never returned to his country.

== Exile ==
Kalakāni's rule lasted only nine months and he was replaced by Mohammad Nadir Shah on 13 October 1929. Amanullah Khan attempted to return to Afghanistan, but he had little support from the people. From British India, the ex-king travelled to Europe and settled in Italy, buying a villa in Rome's Prati neighbourhood. Meanwhile, Nadir Shah made sure Amanullah's return to Afghanistan was made impossible by engaging in propaganda. Most of Amanullah's reforms were reversed, although the future monarch, King Zahir, introduced a more gradual programme of reform.

Nevertheless, Amanullah still had a group of staunch supporters in Afghanistan. These Amanullah loyalists unsuccessfully attempted several times in the 1930s and 1940s to bring him back to power.

During the Second World War, Germany had extensive plans to reinstall Amanullah to his throne. Khan, while aware and keen to regain his throne, knew little more about the plan; Nazi officials never invited him to participate in discussions. It was Khan's name and face that was needed to provide legitimacy to an uprising and, eventually, a puppet Nazi government in Afghanistan. The plan, however, did not come to fruition; for it to work, Germany needed the support of the Soviet Union, which it never fully received. While Hitler cancelled the plan in the last days of December 1939, there was still hope in the German Foreign Office and the Abwehr that the Soviets would come forward with a proposal; it never happened.

Discussions were revived in late 1942, but following the Axis loss in Stalingrad in 1943, the plans were abandoned.

Amidst all the negotiations, Khan remained in exile in Rome and never directly spoke to German or Soviet officials. While some war-time news articles suggest he was an active Nazi agent, other sources suggest he never even succeeded in obtaining a visa to visit Berlin. It was his brother-in-law, Ghulam Siddiq, to whom Khan had given full powers to negotiate on his behalf, that travelled between Germany, the Soviet Union, Italy and Switzerland to participate in talks surrounding the operation.

Khan survived the war unharmed but appears to have lived a life of poverty in his exile, at least during and immediately after the Second World War. One of the reasons Nazi officials hesitated from inviting him to Berlin was because they suspected he would ask for money. Moreover, a British intelligence officer, who visited Khan after the Allies had captured Rome, described the former King's household: 'His Majesty from time to time rubbing his hand from cold. Her Majesty huddled in a ghastly gilt arm-chair, gracefully draped in a mink coat. Pimp-like princelings and over-painted Royal Aunts from time to time taping the conversation towards kilowatts and the lack of scruples shown by black marketeers.' Nevertheless, people in Rome's Prati neighbourhood, where Khan lived, claimed that he arrived with "crates of jewels" which he slowly sold.

== Death ==
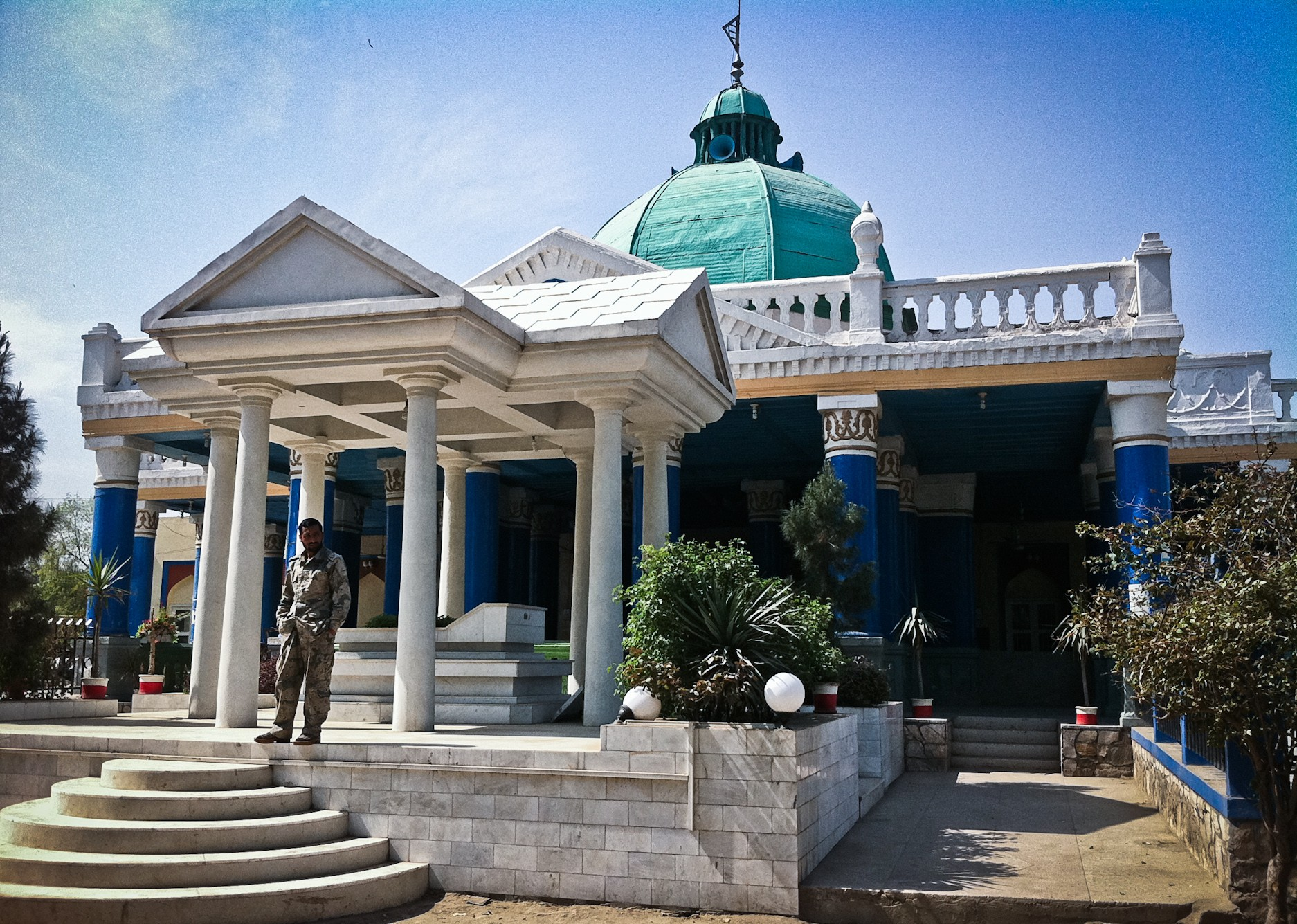
Mausoleum of Amanullah Khan in Jalalabad

After fleeing to British India, King Amanullah Khan sought asylum in Italy because he was given the Order of the Annunciation by King Victor Emmanuel III on his world tour. He died on 26 April 1960 in Zürich, Switzerland. His body was brought to Afghanistan and buried in the eastern city of Jalalabad near the tomb of his father Haibullah Khan. He left behind his widowed wife and four sons and five daughters, including Princess India of Afghanistan.

== Family ==
Amanullah's first marriage occurred in 1908, when he was sixteen but ended in divorce shortly afterwards. One of his wives, Gul Pari, was a Chitrali and served as a lady-in-waiting to his mother. They married in 1910, when he was eighteen. She died in 1912 during childbirth while giving birth to their son, Hedayatullah. Another wife, Soraya Tarzi (1899–1968), was the daughter of Mahmud Tarzi, who served as Afghanistan's Foreign Minister, and his second wife, Asma Rasmiya Khanum. Together, Amanullah and Soraya had ten children—six sons and four daughters. He also married Vanda, with whom he had two sons. Another of his wives, Princess Aliah, was the daughter of his paternal uncle, Emir Nasrullah Khan, and his wife Gulshan, a Shighnani. They married on 31 December 1928, but she did not accompany him into exile to Italy in 1929, and he eventually sent her a divorce. Aliah chose not to remarry.

Amanullah and Soraya had ten children, six daughters and four sons:

- Princess Ameenah Shah (14 May 1916 – 29 October 1992). During her exile, in 1954 she married a naturalised Turkish citizen of Bosnian origin named Mustafa Hasanovic Ar. He was the son of the deputy of the Bosnian Young Muslims.
- Princess Abedah. She married firstly Ali Wali, son of Muhammad Wali and had one son. She married secondly to Hamidullah Enayat Seraj, son of Sardar Enayatullah.
  - Ikhlil
- Princess Meliha (1920–2011). She became a medical doctor in Istanbul University, and married Turkish engineer A. Tahir Söker, a close relative of Celâl Bayar.
- Crown Prince Rahmatullah of Afghanistan (7 June 1921 – 11 September 2009). He married Adelia Graziani, a niece of an Italian general Rodolfo Graziani.
- Prince Saifullah died young from cholera.
- Prince Hymayatullah died very young from bronchial pneumonia.
- Princess Adeela (1925–2000) married Armando Angelini (b. August 10, 1924), the son of an Italian cavalry officer and they had four daughters:
  - Elisabetta (b. 31 May 1948)
  - Cristina (b. 3 Oct 1949)
  - Simin (b. 8 Oct 1954)
  - Cinzia (b. 11 Jan 1957)
- Prince Ehsanullah (1926–2017) married Leyla Tarzi, daughter of Col. Tavvab Tarzi, son of Mahmud Tarzi. They had 2 sons, both born in Istanbul:
  - Ahmed Aman Ullah (b. 1961), married Sylvie Théobald Rahmat Ullah (b. at Bourges, Cher, France)
  - Rahmad Ullah, (b. 1965), married Carine d'Afghanistan-Berger of Bernex, Switzerland.
- Princess India (1929–2023), in 1951 she married Kazem Malek, an Iranian landowner, and settled in Mashhad, Iran. They had two daughters: Soraya, born in 1954 in Rome, Italy, and Hamdam, born in Mashad, Iran in 1956. After eight years of marriage Princess India divorced her husband and returned to Rome to live with her two daughters. In 1966 she married an Afghan businessman, Abdul Rauf Haider. They had a son named Eskandar who was born in Rome in 1967. In 1968, Princess India returned to Afghanistan after the death of her mother Queen Soraya. She attended funeral ceremonies in Jalalabad and was very much impressed by her homeland and decided from that time on she would work for the benefit of Afghanistan.
  - Soraya (b. 1954), first daughter of Princess India
  - Haman (b. 1956), second daughter of Princess India and her husband Kazem Malek. Haman later married an Italian naval commander, Paolo Fusarini. The couple had two children, Matteo and Flavia.
  - Eskandar (b. 1967), son of Princess India and Abdul Rauf Haider.
- Princess Nagia, the youngest daughter of Amanullah and Soraya. She married İlter Doğan, a Turkish businessman whom she met on her visit to Istanbul. They have two children.
  - Ömer, son of Princess Nagia and İlter Doğan
  - Hümeyra, daughter of Princess Nagia and İlter Doğan

== See also ==
- History of Afghanistan
- Reforms of Amānullāh Khān and civil war
- Lycées Esteqlal and Malalaï in Kabul
- Order of the Supreme Sun
- Amir Amanullah Khan Award

== Bibliography ==
- Rashikh, Jawan Shir (2017). Nationalism in Afghanistan. Kabul, Afghanistan: Academia. pp. 1–143. ISBN 9780060505080.
- Ahmed, Fazel (3 September 2016). "Chapter 5 King Amanullah Khan". Conspiracies and Atrocities in Afghanistan,1700-2014 (PDF). Canada: Afghan3. pp. 183–215. ISBN 978-0786191703.
- Hauner, Milan (1981). "The Amanullah Plan". India in Axis Strategy. Klett-Cotta. pp. 159–73. ISBN 3-12-915340-3.

Amanullah Khan Barakzai Dynasty Born: 01 June 1892 Died: 25 April 1960
Regnal titles
Preceded by Habibullah Khan	Emir of Afghanistan; 1919–1926	Succeeded by Himself; King of Afghanistan
Preceded by Himself; Emir of Afghanistan	King of Afghanistan; 1926–1929	Succeeded by Inayatullah Khan
