= Inayatullah Khan =

King of Afghanistan in 1929

- King of Afghanistan
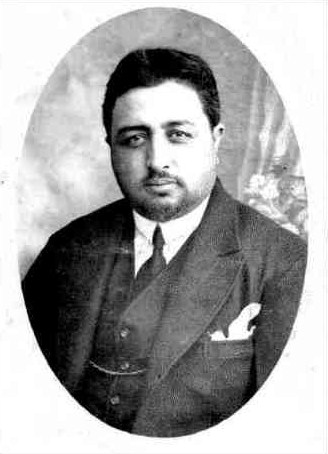
- Inayatullah Khan in 1929

King of Afghanistan
- Reign: 14 January 1929 – 17 January 1929
- Predecessor: Amanullah Khan
- Successor: Habibullāh Kalakāni (In Kabul); Ali Ahmad Khan (In Jalalabad)
- Born: 20 October 1888; Kabul, Emirate of Afghanistan
- Died: 12 August 1946 (aged 57); Tehran, Imperial State of Iran
- Consort: Khairiya Khanum Effendi
- Dynasty: Barakzai
- Father: Habibullah Khan
- Mother: Jamal Begum
- Religion: Sunni Islam
- Military career
- Conflicts: 1919 Afghan coup d'état (POW): Afghan Civil War (1928–1929); Second Battle of Kabul (surrendered)

Inayatullah Khan Barakzai (Note: Pashto: عنايت الله خان بارکزی, romanized: 'Ināyatullāh Xān Bārakzai [ʔi.nɑ.ja.t̪u(l).lɑ(h) xɑn bɑ.ɾak.zaɪ]; Persian: عنایت الله خان بارکزی, romanized: 'Ināyatullāh Khān Bārakzay [ʔɪ.nɑː.jät̪‿ʊl.lɑ́ː(ʱ) xɑːn bɑː.ɾäk.záj]) (20 October 1888 – 12 August 1946) was the King of Afghanistan for 3 days in January 1929. He was the son of former Afghan Emir, Habibullah Khan. Inayatullah's brief reign ended with his abdication.

Khan was born into a Pashtun family. In the middle of the night, on 14 January 1929, Amanullah Khan handed over his throne to his brother Inayatullah Khan and tried to secretly escape from Kabul to Kandahar. Habibullāh Kalakāni and his followers chased Amanullah's Rolls-Royce on horseback but Amanullah managed to escape.

With the King gone, Kalakani wrote a letter to Inayatullah to either surrender or prepare for war. Inayatullah's response was that he had never sought nor wished to be king and agreed to abdicate and proclaim Kalakani as king on 17 January 1929. Inayatullah was airlifted out of Kabul by the Royal Air Force and spent the remainder of his life in exile. In August 1929, during the Afghan Civil War (1928–1929), there were rumours in Kabul that rupees bearing Inayatullah's name were circulating among anti-Kalakani forces. This led some to believe that Inayatullah had begun to contest the Afghan throne. However, nothing came of this, and the rumours quickly subsided. Inayatullah remained in Iran, until his death in Tehran in 1946.

== Family ==
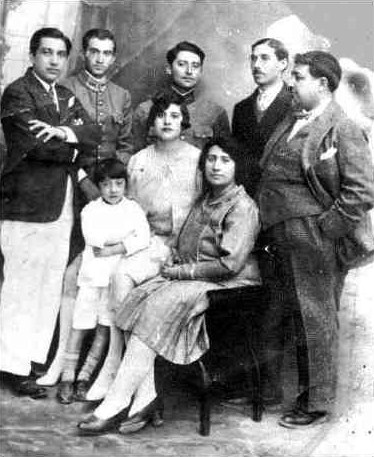
Inayatullah with family

Inayatullah married Khariya (Khariya, a daughter of Mahmud Tarzi) in October 1910 had Khalilullah Seraj (born 1910), Ruhullah Seraj (born 1911, died 1913), Zaynab Seraj, Mastura Seraj, Humaira Seraj, Hamidullah Enayat Seraj (born 1917), Roqya Seraj (born 1918), Hamida Seraj (born 1920), Khayrullah Enayat Seraj (born 1921), Esmatullah Enayat Seraj (born 1922), Latifa Seraj (born 1923), Anisa Seraj (born 1924), Nafisa Seraj (born 1925).

== Notes ==
Inayatullah Khan Barakzai Dynasty Born: 20 October 1888 Died: 12 August 1946
Regnal titles
Preceded by Amanullah Khan	King of Afghanistan; 1929	Succeeded by Habibullah Kalakani (In Kabul); Ali Ahmad Khan (In Jalalabad)
