= 2002 Afghan coup plot =

Attempted overthrow of the Afghan Interim Government

2002 Afghan Coup Plot
- Part of War in Afghanistan (2001–2021)
Date	April 2002
Location	Kabul, Afghanistan
Result	Coup plot foiled: hundreds arrested; King Zahir Shah Returned to Afghanistan; Loya Jirga proceeded as planned

Belligerents
Afghan Interim Government	Hezb-e-Islami Gulbuddin

Commanders and leaders
Hamid Karzai; Qasim Fahim; Bismillah Khan; Mohammad Zahir Shah (symbolic target, in exile)	Gulbuddin Hekmatyar; Waheedullah Sabawoon

Strength
Unknown	About 300–350 suspects

Casualties and losses
None	Hundreds arrested; some later released

The 2002 Afghan coup plot was a plan by Hezb-e-Islami Gulbuddin, led by Gulbuddin Hekmatyar, to overthrow the Afghan Interim Government in April 2002. The plot aimed to assassinate President Hamid Karzai and former King Mohammed Zahir Shah, carry out bombings in Kabul, attack foreign troops, and disrupt the upcoming Loya Jirga.

== Background ==
After the fall of the Taliban in 2001, Afghanistan was run by an interim government led by President Hamid Karzai. The country was unstable, with different groups and militias competing for power. Former King Mohammed Zahir Shah, who had lived in Italy since 1973, was planning to return and was seen as a unifying figure, but his trip was delayed because of threats to his life. At the same time, Hezb-e-Islami, led by Gulbuddin Hekmatyar, opposed the government and foreign forces. The alleged coup plot happened during this period, as the country prepared for the Loya Jirga, a national assembly to decide the transitional leadership.

== Plot ==
According to Afghan officials, the coup plot aimed to assassinate President Hamid Karzai and former King Mohammed Zahir Shah, place bombs around Kabul, attack foreign troops and government officials, and stop the Loya Jirga from taking place. Hundreds of people were arrested in Kabul and nearby areas. Many of the suspects were linked to Hezb-e-Islami, and some were connected to Wahidullah Sabaoon, a former associate of Gulbuddin Hekmatyar.

== Aftermath ==
The Afghan government said the coup plot was stopped before it could be carried out. Many of those arrested were later released, and some innocent people may have been detained. The incident showed that security in Kabul was still weak and delayed the return of former King Mohammed Zahir Shah, who arrived under heavy protection on 18 April 2002.
