= List of heads of state of Afghanistan =

This article lists the heads of state of Afghanistan since the foundation of the first modern Afghan state, the Hotak Empire, in 1709.

== History ==
The Hotak Empire was formed after a successful uprising led by Mirwais Hotak and other Afghan tribal chiefs from the Kandahar region against Mughal and Safavid Persian rule.

After a long series of wars, the Hotak Empire was eventually replaced by the Durrani Afghan Empire, founded by Ahmad Shah Durrani in 1747.

After the collapse of the Durrani Empire in 1823, the Barakzai dynasty founded the Emirate of Kabul, later known as the Emirate of Afghanistan. The Durrani dynasty regained power in 1839, during the First Anglo-Afghan War, when former ruler Shah Shujah Durrani seized the throne under the British auspices. Shah Shujah was assassinated in 1842, following the British retreat. Afterwards the Barakzai dynasty regained power, eventually transformed the Emirate into the Kingdom of Afghanistan in 1926, and ruled the country (with an interruption in 1929) until the last king, Mohammad Zahir Shah, was deposed in the 1973 coup d'état, led by his first cousin Mohammad Daoud Khan. Despite being part of the Barakzai dynasty, Daoud Khan departed from tradition and did not proclaim himself Shah, instead abolished the monarchy and established the Republic of Afghanistan, with himself as President. The Republic lasted until the PDPA–led Saur Revolution in 1978.

Since 1978, Afghanistan has been in a state of continuous internal conflict and foreign interventions.

President Hamid Karzai became the first ever democratically elected head of state of Afghanistan on 7 December 2004. His successor, Ashraf Ghani, was in power from 29 September 2014 to 15 August 2021, when he fled the country as Kabul fell to the Taliban following its 2021 offensive.

Upon its recapture of Kabul, the Taliban reinstated the Islamic Emirate of Afghanistan, and its supreme leader since 2016, Islamic scholar Hibatullah Akhundzada, de facto succeeded Ghani as head of state.

== List of heads of state ==
(Dates in italics indicate de facto continuation of office)

=== Monarchs ===
Monarch of Afghanistan
- د افغانستان پاچا (Pashto); پادشاه افغانستان (Dari)
- Royal Standard (1931–1973)

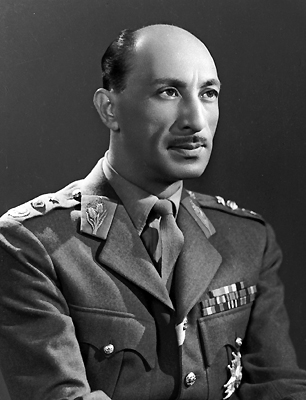
- Last to reign: Mohammad Zahir Shah; 8 November 1933 – 17 July 1973

Details
- Style: His Majesty
- First monarch: Mirwais Hotak (Emir)
- Last monarch: Mohammad Zahir Shah (King)
- Formed: 21 April 1709
- Abolished: 17 July 1973
- Residence: Kabul (Note: Bala Hissar (18th century – 1880); Arg-e-Shahi (19th century – 1973).)
- Appointer: Hereditary
- Pretender: Prince Muhammad Zahir Khan

==== Hotak Empire (1709–1738) ====
Name	Lifespan	Reign start	Reign end	Notes	Family	Image
Mirwais Hotak: Mirwais the Grandfather	1673–1715 (aged 42)	21 April 1709	November 1715	Established the Hotak dynasty in Kandahar.	Hotak	Mirwais Hotak of Afghanistan
Abdul Aziz Hotak	Died 1717	November 1715	1717	Brother of Mirwais Hotak	Hotak	Abdul Aziz Hotak of Afghanistan
Mahmud Hotak	1697 – 22 April 1725 (aged 28)	1717	22 April 1725	Son of Mirwais Hotak	Hotak	Mahmud Hotak of Afghanistan
Ashraf Hotak	Died 1730	22 April 1725	1730	Nephew of Mirwais Hotak	Hotak	Ashraf Hotak of Afghanistan
Hussain Hotak	Died 1738	1730	24 March 1738 (deposed)	Son of Mirwais Hotak Deposed by Nader Shah in Siege of Kandahar	Hotak	Hussain Hotak of Afghanistan

==== Durrani Empire (1747–1823; 1839–1842) ====
Name	Lifespan	Reign start	Reign end	Notes	Family	Image
Ahmad Shah Durrani: the Father of the Nation; احمد شاه دراني	1720/1722 – 4 June 1772 (aged 50–52)	June 1747	4 June 1772	Established the Durrani dynasty and the Durrani Empire; Considered founder of modern Afghanistan	Durrani	Ahmad Shah Durrani of Afghanistan
Timur Shah Durrani: تېمور شاه دراني	December 1746 – 20 May 1793 (aged 46)	November 1772	20 May 1793	Son of Ahmad Shah Durrani Preserved the Durrani Empire following the death of his father after fighting off civil war in 1772, and multiple rebellions	Durrani	Timur Shah Durrani of Afghanistan
Zaman Shah Durrani: زمان شاه دراني	1767–1845 (aged 78)	20 May 1793	25 July 1801 (deposed)	Son of Timur Shah Durrani Engaged in civil war with his brothers after the death of his father, later being deposed	Durrani	Zaman Shah Durrani of Afghanistan
Mahmud Shah Durrani (1st reign): Shah Mahmud; محمود شاه دراني	1769 – 18 April 1829 (aged 60)	25 July 1801	13 July 1803 (deposed)	Son of Timur Shah Durrani Engaged in civil war with his brothers after the death of his father, later being deposed	Durrani	Mahmud Shah Durrani of Afghanistan
Shuja Shah Durrani (1st reign): Inayat-i-llahi, Shuja ul-Mulk, Muhammad Bahadur; شجاع شاه دراني	4 November 1785 – 5 April 1842 (aged 56)	13 July 1803	3 May 1809 (deposed)	Son of Timur Shah Durrani Engaged in civil war with his brothers after the death of his father, later being deposed, and making multiple attempts to reclaim his throne	Durrani	Shuja Shah Durrani of Afghanistan
Mahmud Shah Durrani (2nd reign): Shah Mahmud; محمود شاه دراني	1769 – 18 April 1829 (aged 60)	3 May 1809	1818 (deposed)	Son of Timur Shah Durrani Exiled to Herat following his deposition during his second reign	Durrani	Mahmud Shah Durrani of Afghanistan
Ali Shah Durrani: علي شاه دراني	Died 1819	1818	1819 (deposed)	Son of Timur Shah Durrani Strangled to death by his brothers Shah Ismail Durrani and Ayub Shah Durrani	Durrani	Ali Shah Durrani of Afghanistan
Ayub Shah Durrani: ايوب شاه دراني	Died 1837	1819	1823 (deposed)	Son of Timur Shah Durrani Overthrown by Sultan Mohammad Khan of the Barakzai dynasty	Durrani	Ayub Shah Durrani of Afghanistan

Name	Lifespan	Reign start	Reign end	Notes	Family	Image
Shuja Shah Durrani (2nd reign): Inayat-i-llahi, Shuja ul-Mulk, Muhammad Bahadur; شجاع شاع دراني	4 November 1785 – 5 April 1842 (aged 56)	7 August 1839	5 April 1842	Son of Timur Shah Durrani Returned to the throne with the help of the British in the First Anglo-Afghan War, murdered in the aftermath of the 1842 retreat from Kabul	Durrani	Shuja Shah Durrani of Afghanistan
Fateh Jang Durrani: فتح جنگ دراني	Died 1855	5 April 1842	12 October 1842	Son of Shah Shuja Durrani	Durrani	Fateh Jang Durrani of Afghanistan
Shahpur Shah Durrani: شاهپور شاه دراني	Died 1884	12 October 1842	December 1842	Son of Shah Shuja Durrani	Durrani	Sultan Shahpur Durrani of Afghanistan

==== Emirate of Kabul / Emirate of Afghanistan (1823–1839; 1842–1926) ====
Name	Lifespan	Reign start	Reign end	Notes	Family	Image
Sultan Mohammad Khan: Mohammad Khan Telai	1795–1861 (aged 66)	1823	1826 (deposed)	First ruler of the Barakzai dynasty; Son of Sardar Payendah Khan, brother of Dost Mohammad Khan	Barakzai	Sultan Mohammad Khan of Afghanistan
Dost Mohammad Khan (1st reign): Amir al-Mu'minin, Amir-i Kabir	23 December 1792 – 9 June 1863 (aged 70)	Summer 1826	6 August 1839 (deposed)	Son of Sardar Payendah Khan Initiated campaigns to re-unite Afghanistan which was divided due to the civil wars between the sons of Timur Shah Durrani. Reign disputed from 1839–1842 by Shuja Shah Durrani in the First Anglo-Afghan War	Barakzai	Dost Mohammad Khan of Afghanistan

Name	Lifespan	Reign start	Reign end	Notes	Family	Image
Mohammad Akbar Khan: Amīr Akbar Khān, Wazir Akbar Khān	1816–1847 (aged 31)	May 1842	1843	Son of Dost Mohammad Khan	Barakzai	Mohammad Akbar Khan of Afghanistan
Dost Mohammad Khan (2nd reign): Amir al-Mu'minin, Amir-i Kabir	23 December 1792 – 9 June 1863 (aged 70)	1843	9 June 1863	Son of Sardar Payendah Khan Returned to the throne after the British and Shah Shuja were defeated in the First Anglo-Afghan War. Coined the term "Afghanistan" after an alliance with the British. Went on to defeat the remaining powers inside Afghanistan (Note: Most notably Herat (see Herat campaign of 1862–1863) and Kandahar (see Conquest of Kandahar).), reunifying the country after a brutal civil war lasting 70 years from 1793–1863 by the time of his death	Barakzai	Dost Mohammad Khan of Afghanistan
Sher Ali Khan (1st reign)	1825 – 21 February 1879 (aged 54)	9 June 1863	May 1866 (deposed)	Son of Dost Mohammad Khan	Barakzai	Sher Ali Khan of Afghanistan
Mohammad Afzal Khan	1815 – 7 October 1867 (aged 52)	May 1866	7 October 1867	Son of Dost Mohammad Khan	Barakzai	Mohammad Afzal Khan of Afghanistan
Mohammad Azam Khan	1820–1870 (aged 50)	7 October 1867	21 August 1868	Son of Dost Mohammad Khan	Barakzai	Mohammad Azam Khan of Afghanistan
Sher Ali Khan (2nd reign)	1825 – 21 February 1879 (aged 54)	9 September 1868	21 February 1879	Son of Dost Mohammad Khan	Barakzai	Sher Ali Khan of Afghanistan
Mohammad Yaqub Khan	1849 – 15 November 1923 (aged 74)	21 February 1879	12 October 1879 (deposed)	Son of Sher Ali Khan Deposed during the Second Anglo-Afghan War	Barakzai	Mohammad Yaqub Khan of Afghanistan
Mohammad Ayub Khan: the Victor of Maiwand the Afghan Prince Charlie	1857 – 7 April 1914 (aged 57)	12 October 1879	31 May 1880 (deposed)	Son of Sher Ali Khan Defeated in the Battle of Kandahar and exiled at the end of the Second Anglo-Afghan War	Barakzai	Mohammad Ayub Khan of Afghanistan
Abdur Rahman Khan: the Iron Amir	1840/44 – 1 October 1901 (aged 57–61)	31 May 1880	1 October 1901	Son of Mohammad Afzal Khan	Barakzai	Abdur Rahman Khan of Afghanistan
Habibullah Khan	3 June 1872 – 20 February 1919 (aged 46)	1 October 1901	20 February 1919	Son of Abdur Rahman Khan	Barakzai	Habibullah Khan of Afghanistan
Nasrullah Khan	1874 – May 1920 (aged 46)	20 February 1919	28 February 1919 (deposed)	Son of Abdur Rahman Khan	Barakzai	Nasrullah Khan of Afghanistan
Amanullah Khan	1 June 1892 – 26 April 1960 (aged 67)	28 February 1919	9 June 1926	Son of Habibullah Khan	Barakzai	Amanullah Khan of Afghanistan

==== Kingdom of Afghanistan (1926–1929) ====
Name	Lifespan	Reign start	Reign end	Notes	Family	Image
Amanullah Khan	1 June 1892 – 26 April 1960 (aged 67)	9 June 1926	14 January 1929 (abdicated)	Son of Habibullah Khan	Barakzai	Amanullah Khan of Afghanistan
Inayatullah Khan	20 October 1888 – 12 August 1946 (aged 57)	14 January 1929	17 January 1929 (abdicated)	Son of Habibullah Khan	Barakzai	Inayatullah Khan of Afghanistan

==== Saqqawist Emirate and the 1928–1929 civil war ====
Name	Lifespan	Reign start	Reign end	Notes	Family	Image
Habibullah Kalakani: Bacha-ye Saqao	19 January 1891 – 3 November 1929 (aged 38)	17 January 1929 (Note: Most sources list 17 January 1929, the day that Kalakāni captured Kabul, as the date that his reign began. However, he had been formally claiming the title of emir since 14 December 1928.)	13 October 1929	Styled as king and emir (Note: Kalakani referred to himself as both "king" and "emir".); contested the throne during the 1928–29 civil war; deposed and executed	Non-dynastic	Habibullah Kalakani of Afghanistan
Ali Ahmad Khan	1883 – 11 July 1929 (aged 46)	17 January 1929	9 February 1929	Grandson of Dost Mohammad Khan (maternal) Styled as King; rose in opposition to Kalakāni during the 1928–29 civil war; captured and executed	Barakzai	Ali Ahmad Khan of Afghanistan
Amanullah Khan	1 June 1892 – 26 April 1960 (aged 67)	March 1929	23 May 1929	Son of Habibullah Khan Former King; returned to Afghanistan to contest the throne during the 1928–29 civil war; eventually retreated back into British India; See also Amanullah loyalism	Barakzai	Amanullah Khan of Afghanistan

==== Kingdom of Afghanistan (restored; 1929–1973) ====
Name	Lifespan	Reign start	Reign end	Notes	Family	Image
Mohammad Nadir Shah	9 April 1883 – 8 November 1933 (aged 50)	15 October 1929	8 November 1933	Great-grandson of Sultan Mohammad Khan Assassinated by Abdul Khaliq Hazara	Barakzai	Mohammad Nadir Shah of Afghanistan
Mohammad Zahir Shah: Father of the Nation (from 2004) (Note: "The late King was always fondly referred to by all Afghans, cutting across ethnic boundaries, as "Baba-e-Millat" or 'Father of the Nation', a position given to him in the country's Constitution promulgated in January 2004, about two years after the collapse of Taliban rule. The title of the 'Father of the Nation' dissolves with his death." "Last King of Afghanistan dies at 92". Archived from the original on 30 September 2007.)	15 October 1914 – 23 July 2007 (aged 92)	8 November 1933	17 July 1973 (deposed)	Son of Mohammad Nadir Shah Deposed by first cousin Mohammad Daoud Khan in the 1973 coup d'état	Barakzai	Mohammad Zahir Shah of Afghanistan

==== Local monarchs ====
Some rulers tried to take advantage of internal conflicts in Afghanistan to claim the throne. However, their rule was limited only to certain areas.

Name	Lifespan	Reign start	Reign end	Notes	Family	Image
Jehandad Khan	Died 1914	May 1912	May 1912 (deposed)	Styled as Emir; ruled only in Khost during the 1912 rebellion	Non-dynastic	Jehandad Khan of Afghanistan
Abd-al Karim	1897 – 18 February 1927 (aged 30)	July 1924	30 January 1925 (deposed)	Son of Mohammad Yaqub Khan Styled as Emir; rule limited to the Southern Province during the 1924–1925 rebellion	Barakzai	Abd-al Karim of Afghanistan
Salemai		c. 1944	c. 1946 (deposed)	Styled as King; rule limited to the Eastern Province during the 1944–47 tribal revolts	Non-dynastic	Salemai of Afghanistan

=== Non-monarchs ===
Name	Portrait	Lifespan	Term of office			Political affiliation
Name	Portrait	Lifespan	Took office	Left office	Time in office	Political affiliation
Republic of Afghanistan (1973–1978)
Mohammad Daoud Khan		1909–1978	17 July 1973	28 April 1978	4 years, 285 days	Independent (until 1974)
Mohammad Daoud Khan		1909–1978	17 July 1973	28 April 1978	4 years, 285 days	National Revolutionary Party
Mohammad Daoud Khan		1909–1978	President; Member of the Barakzai dynasty (first cousin of Mohammad Zahir Shah); Assassinated with most of his family during the Saur Revolution; Supposedly killed for refusing to surrender to the new authorities.			
Colonel; Abdul Qadir		1944–2014	28 April 1978	30 April 1978	2 days	People's Democratic Party (Khalq faction)
Colonel; Abdul Qadir		1944–2014	Acting Head of State; Chairman of the Presidium of the Military Revolutionary Council.			
Democratic Republic of Afghanistan (1978–1992)
Nur Muhammad Taraki		1917–1979	30 April 1978	14 September 1979	1 year, 137 days	People's Democratic Party (Khalq faction)
Nur Muhammad Taraki		1917–1979	Chairman of the Presidium of the Revolutionary Council; Assassinated by orders of Hafizullah Amin.			
Hafizullah Amin		1929–1979	14 September 1979	27 December 1979	104 days	People's Democratic Party (Khalq faction)
Hafizullah Amin		1929–1979	Chairman of the Presidium of the Revolutionary Council; Assassinated by Soviet special forces during the Operation Storm-333.			
Babrak Karmal		1929–1996	27 December 1979	24 November 1986	6 years, 332 days	People's Democratic Party (Parcham faction)
Babrak Karmal		1929–1996	Chairman of the Presidium of the Revolutionary Council; Dismissed.			
Haji Mohammad Chamkani		1947–2012	24 November 1986	30 September 1987	310 days	Independent
Haji Mohammad Chamkani		1947–2012	Chairman of the Presidium of the Revolutionary Council; Appointed as part of the National Reconciliation process.			
Mohammad Najibullah		1947–1996	30 September 1987	16 April 1992	4 years, 199 days	People's Democratic Party (Parcham faction) (until 1990)
Mohammad Najibullah		1947–1996	30 September 1987	16 April 1992	4 years, 199 days	Homeland Party
Mohammad Najibullah		1947–1996	President (Chairman of the Presidium of the Revolutionary Council until 30 November 1987); Resigned.			
Abdul Rahim Hatif		1926–2013	16 April 1992	28 April 1992	12 days	Homeland Party
Abdul Rahim Hatif		1926–2013	Acting President; Deposed.			
Islamic State of Afghanistan (1992–2002)
Sibghatullah Mojaddedi		1926–2019	28 April 1992	28 June 1992	61 days	National Liberation Front of Afghanistan
Sibghatullah Mojaddedi		1926–2019	Acting President; Resigned.			
Burhanuddin Rabbani		1940–2011	28 June 1992	22 December 2001	9 years, 177 days	Jamiat-e Islami
Burhanuddin Rabbani		1940–2011	President; Fled Kabul following its fall to the Taliban on 27 September 1996; Continued to serve as president in areas controlled by the Northern Alliance during the 1996–2001 Civil War until being fully reinstated following the recapture of Kabul on 13 November 2001; Between 1996 and 2001, the Islamic State remained the internationally recognized government, despite only controlling about 10% of Afghan territory.			
Hamid Karzai		born 1957	22 December 2001	19 June 2002	179 days	Independent
Hamid Karzai		born 1957	Chairman of the Afghan Interim Administration; Appointed by the 2001 Bonn Conference.			
Islamic Emirate of Afghanistan (1996–2001)
Mullah; Mohammed Omar		between 1953 and 1966 – 2013	27 September 1996	13 November 2001	5 years, 47 days	Taliban
Mullah; Mohammed Omar		between 1953 and 1966 – 2013	Supreme Leader; Deposed following the fall of Kabul, and went into hiding during the fall of Kandahar on 7 December 2001; Continued to claim the position in rebellion during the Taliban insurgency until his death on 23 April 2013; Between 1996 and 2001, the Islamic Emirate never attained widespread international recognition, despite controlling about 90% of Afghan territory. (Note: Between 1996 and 2001, only three UN member states—Pakistan, Saudi Arabia, and the United Arab Emirates (UAE)—recognized the Islamic Emirate as the rightful government of Afghanistan.)			
Transitional Islamic State of Afghanistan (2002–2004)
Hamid Karzai		born 1957	19 June 2002	7 December 2004	2 years, 171 days	Independent
Hamid Karzai		born 1957	Transitional President; Appointed by the 2002 loya jirga.			
Islamic Republic of Afghanistan (2004–2021)
Hamid Karzai		born 1957	7 December 2004	29 September 2014	9 years, 296 days	Independent
Hamid Karzai		born 1957	President; First democratically elected head of state; Elected in 2004 and re-elected in 2009.			
Ashraf Ghani		born 1949	29 September 2014	15 August 2021	6 years, 320 days	Independent
Ashraf Ghani		born 1949	President; First peaceful transition of power; Elected in 2014 and re-elected in 2019; Deposed during the fall of Kabul.			
Islamic Emirate of Afghanistan (2021–present)
Mullah; Mawlawi; Hibatullah Akhundzada		born 1967	15 August 2021	Incumbent	5 years, 99 days	Taliban
Mullah; Mawlawi; Hibatullah Akhundzada		born 1967	Supreme Leader; Claimed the position in rebellion during the Taliban insurgency from 25 May 2016 until the recapture of Kabul. The Islamic Emirate currently has limited international recognition, despite controlling all Afghan territory. (Note: As of 2026, only one UN member state—Russia—recognized the Islamic Emirate as the rightful government of Afghanistan.)			

== Family tree of monarchs ==
Family tree of Afghan monarchs

Salim Khan
Hotak dynasty
Mirwais; Khan Hotak^{(1)} r. 1709–1715	Abdul Aziz; Hotak^{(2)} r. 1715–1717
Mahmud; Hotak^{(3)} r. 1717–1725	Hussain; Hotak^{(5)} r. 1725–1738	Ashraf; Hotak^{(4)} r. 1725–1729
Durrani dynasty
Ahmad Shah; Durrani^{(1)} r. 1747–1772	Sardar; Payinda; Mohammad; Khan
Barakzai dynasty
Timur Shah; Durrani^{(2)} r. 1772–1793	Mohammad; Khan^{(1)} r. 1823–1826	Dost; Mohammad; Khan^{(2)} r. 1826–1839, 1843–1863
Zaman Shah; Durrani^{(3)} r. 1793–1801	Mahmud Shah; Durrani^{(4)} r. 1801–1803, 1809–1818	Shah Shujah; Durrani^{(5)} r. 1803–1809, 1839–1842	Ali Shah; Durrani^{(6)} r. 1818–1819	Ayub Shah; Durrani^{(7)} r. 1819–1823	Mohammad; Afzal Khan^{(5)} r. 1866–1867	Akbar Khan^{(3)} r. 1842–1843	Mohammad; Azam Khan^{(6)} r. 1867–1868	Sher Ali; Khan^{(4)} r. 1863-1866, 1868–1879	Sahira; Begum	Loinab; Khush; Dil Khan
Ali Ahmad; Mirza	Sardar; Mohammad; Yahya Khan	Hamdan; Sultana; Begum	Abdur; Rahman; Khan^{(9)} r. 1880–1901	Mohammad; Yaqub Khan^{(7)} r. 1879	Mohammad; Ayub Khan^{(8)} r. 1879–1880
Sharaf; Sultana; Hukumat; Begum	Sardar; Mohammad; Yusuf Khan	Sardar; Mohammad; Asif Khan	Habibullah; Khan^{(10)} r. 1901–1919	Nasrullah; Khan^{(11)} r. 1919
Mohammad; Nadir Shah^{(15)} r. 1929–1933	Mah Parwar; Begum	Inayatullah; Khan^{(13)} r. 1929	Amanullah; Khan^{(12)} r. 1919–1929, 1929	Ali Ahmad; Khan^{(14)} r. 1929
Mohammad; Zahir Shah^{(16)} r. 1933–1973

== Timeline ==
This is a graphical timeline of the heads of state of Afghanistan from 1880. They are listed in order of first assuming office.

The following chart lists heads of state by lifespan (living heads of state on the green line), with the years outside of their tenure in beige. Heads of state with an unknown birth date or death date are shown with only their tenure or their earlier or later life.

The following chart shows heads of state by their age (living heads of state in green), with the years of their tenure in blue. Heads of state with an unknown birth or death date are excluded. The vertical black line at 40 years indicates the minimum age to be president during the existence of the Islamic Republic of Afghanistan.

== Standards of heads of state ==
Standard of the king of Afghanistan, c. 1919–1929

Standard of the king of Afghanistan, 1931–1973.

Standard of the president of Afghanistan, 1974–1978.

Standard of the president of Afghanistan, 2004–2013.

Standard of the president of Afghanistan, 2013–2021.

== See also ==
- President of Afghanistan
- Supreme Leader of Afghanistan
- Prime Minister of Afghanistan
- Deputy Prime Minister of Afghanistan
- Chief Executive (Afghanistan)
- List of Durrani Wazirs
- Politics of Afghanistan
- History of Afghanistan
- List of Pashtun empires and dynasties
- Name of Afghanistan
- Afghan (ethnonym)
