= Princess Maryam Begum =

Afghan princess (1936–2021)

Maryam Begum Naim
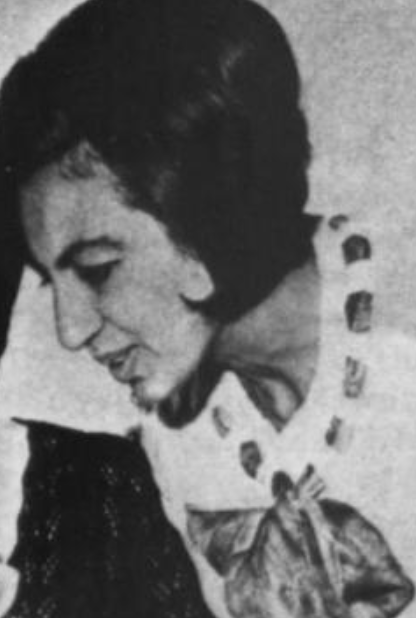
- Princess Maryam Begum, from a 1966 publication of the US Department of State
- Born: 2 November 1936; Dilkusha Palace, Arg, Kabul, Kingdom of Afghanistan
- Died: 25 December 2021 (aged 85); Kabul, Afghanistan
- Burial: Maranjan Hill, Kabul,
- Spouse: Professor Sardar Muhammad Aziz Khan Naim (m. 1960)
- Issue: Sardar Nadir Khan Naim
- House: House of Barakzai
- Father: Mohammed Zahir Shah
- Mother: Humaira Begum
- Religion: Sunni Islam

Princess Maryam Begum Naim (Pashto: مریم بیګم نعیم) (2 November 1936 – 25 December 2021) was an Afghan princess. She was the second daughter of King Mohammed Zahir Shah and Queen Humaira Begum.

Princess Maryam Begum was educated at Malali School, in Kabul. The princess was working as a doctor when her father ruled the country.

Princess Maryam Begum died at home in Kabul, Afghanistan on 25 December 2021, at the age of 85. She was buried at Maranjan Hill in Kabul, Afghanistan.

== Issue ==
1. Sardar Nadir Khan Naim (born in 1965 in Munich, Bavaria, Germany).

== Ancestry ==
Ancestors of Princess Maryam Begum

8. Sardar Mohammed Yusuf Khan, Governor of Herat
4. Mohammed Nadir Shah
9. Sharaf Sultana Hukumat Begum
2. Mohammed Zahir Shah
10. Sardar Muhammad Asif Khan
5. Mah Parwar Begum
11. Murwarid Begum
1. Maryam Begum
12. Sardar Muhammad Asif Khan (= 10)
6. Sardar Ahmad Shah Khan
13. Murwarid Begum (= 11)
3. Humaira Begum
14. Loinab Khush Dil Khan, Governor of Kabul and Kandahar
7. Zarin Begum
15. Sahira Begum
