= Ahmad Shah Khan, Crown Prince of Afghanistan =

Afghan prince (1934–2024)

Ahmad Shah Khan: احمد شاه خان
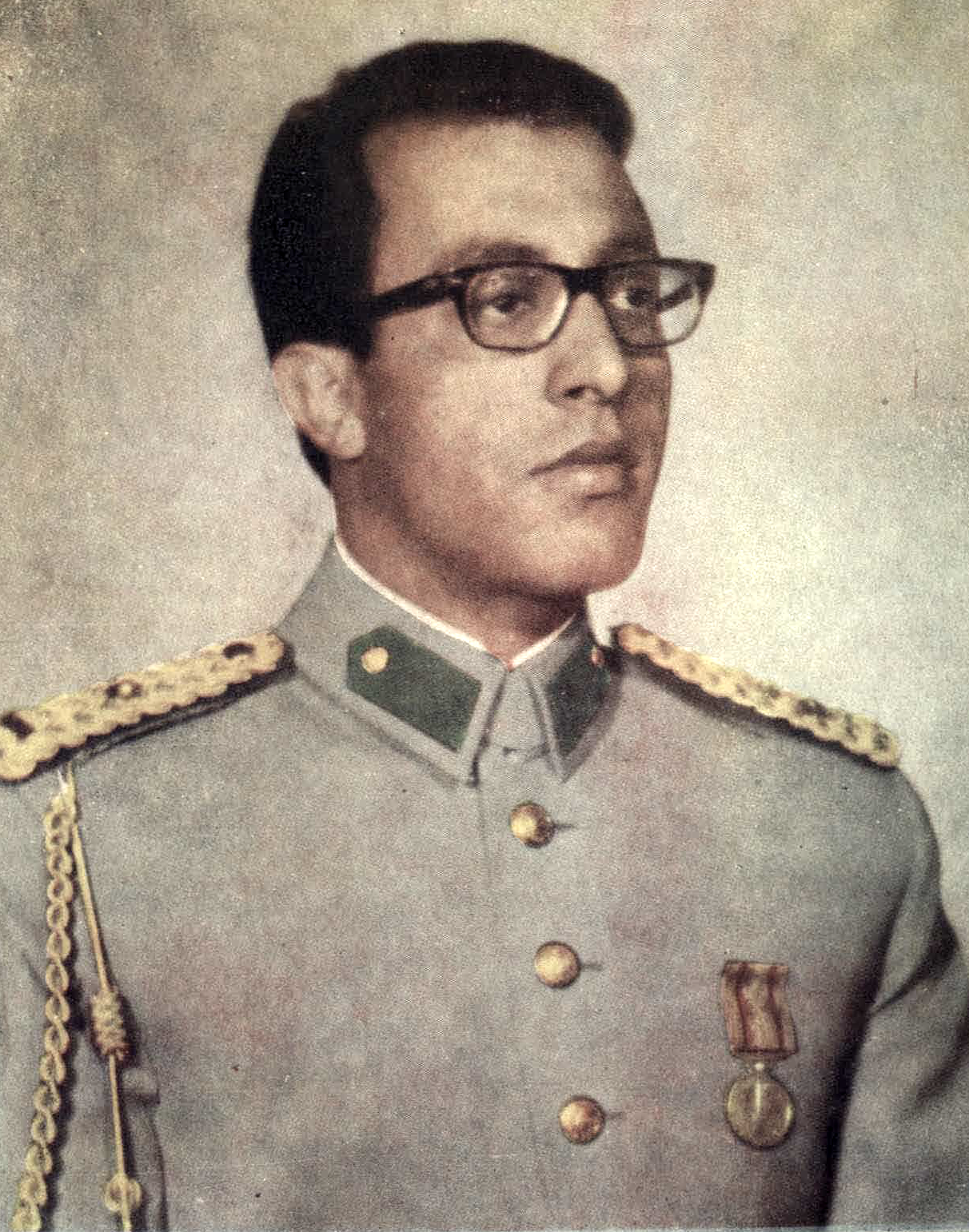
- Shah in 1963

Head of House of Barakzai
- Tenure: 23 July 2007 – 4 June 2024
- Predecessor: Mohammad Zahir Shah
- Successor: Prince Muhammad Zahir Khan

Crown Prince of Afghanistan
- Tenure: 26 November 1942 – 17 July 1973
- Predecessor: Muhammed Akbar Khan, Crown Prince of Afghanistan
- Successor: Monarchy abolished
- Born: 23 September 1934; Arg-i-Shahi, Kabul, Kingdom of Afghanistan
- Died: 4 June 2024 (aged 89); Virginia, U.S.
- Spouse: Khatul Begum (m. 1961)
- Issue: Prince Muhammad Zahir Khan; Princess Hawa Khanum; Prince Muhammad Emel Khan
- House: Barakzai
- Father: Mohammad Zahir Shah
- Mother: Humaira Begum
- Religion: Sunni Islam

Styles of Ahmad Shah
- Reference style: His Royal Highness
- Spoken style: Your Highness

Ahmad Shah, Crown Prince of Afghanistan (Dari/Pashto/Persian: احمد شاه خان; 23 September 1934 – 4 June 2024) was the second son of Mohammad Zahir Shah, the overthrown King of Afghanistan. He held the title of Head of the House of Barakzai from his father's death in July 2007, until his death in June 2024.

== Biography ==
Ahmad Shah was born at the Arg royal palace in Kabul. At the time of his birth he was second in the line of succession to the throne after his older brother Muhammed Akbar Khan, Crown Prince of Afghanistan. However, following the death of his brother on 26 November 1942, he became the heir apparent and Crown Prince. Ahmad Shah represented his father several times as regent when the latter was abroad.

He was educated first at the Esteqlal High School, and College of Military Science, in Kabul. He later attended the University of Oxford and the Institut d'études politiques de Paris, before working at the Ministry of Foreign Affairs in Kabul.

His father's reign ended on 17 July 1973, when he was ousted by a coup with Afghanistan being declared a republic by Mohammad Daoud Khan, a member of the royal family. The Crown Prince was one of fourteen members of the royal family arrested following the coup. He was allowed to leave the country for Rome on 26 July. Following the overthrow of the monarchy, the Crown Prince settled in Alexandria in the U.S. state of Virginia and took to writing poetry, keeping a low profile even after the former king's return to Afghanistan in 2002.

He died on 4 June 2024, at the age of 89. At the time of his death, he was the oldest surviving male heir of the last reigning King of Afghanistan.

== Marriage and issue ==
On 22 November 1961, the Crown Prince married Princess Khatul Begum (born 1940), a daughter of Sardar Muhammad Umar Khan Zikeria, by his wife, Princess Sultana Begum, the fourth daughter of King Mohammad Nadir Shah. The ceremony took place at the Chihil Sutun palace near Kabul. They had two sons and a daughter:

- Prince Muhammad Zahir Khan (born 26 May 1962). He married Princess Oshila Begum (b. 1958). They have a daughter:
  - Princess Roxanne Khanum (born 1988)
- Princess Hawa Khanum (born 27 October 1963)
- Prince Muhammad Emel Khan (born 1969)

== Ancestry ==
Ancestors of Ahmad Shah Khan, Crown Prince of Afghanistan

8. Sardar Mohammed Yusuf Khan, Governor of Herat
4. Mohammed Nadir Shah
9. Sharaf Sultana Hukumat Begum
2. Mohammed Zahir Shah
10. Sardar Muhammad Asif Khan
5. Mah Parwar Begum
11. Murwarid Begum
1. Ahmad Shah Khan
12. Sardar Muhammad Asif Khan (= 10)
6. Sardar Ahmad Shah Khan
13. Murwarid Begum (= 11)
3. Humaira Begum
14. Loinab Khush Dil Khan, Governor of Kabul and Kandahar
7. Zarin Begum
15. Sahira Begum

Ahmad Shah Khan, Crown Prince of Afghanistan House of Barakzai Born: 23 September 1934 Died: 4 June 2024
Titles in pretence
| Preceded by King Mohammad Zahir Shah | — TITULAR — King of Afghanistan; 23 July 2007 – 4 June 2024; Reason for succession failure: Monarchy overthrown in 1973 | Succeeded by Prince Muhammad Zahir Khan |
