= Zamina Begum =

1st First Lady of Afghanistan

Princess Zamina Begum

1st First Lady of Afghanistan
- In role 17 July 1973 – 28 April 1978
- President: Mohammed Daoud Khan
- Preceded by: Position established
- Succeeded by: Nur bibi Taraki

Personal details
- Born: 11 January 1917 Kabul, Emirate of Afghanistan
- Died: 28 April 1978 (aged 61) Kabul, Democratic Republic of Afghanistan
- Cause of death: Assassination
- Resting place: Kabul, Afghanistan
- Spouse(s): Mohammed Daoud Khan (1934–1978)
- Children: 8
- Parents: Mohammed Nadir Shah (father); Mah Parwar Begum (mother)
- Relatives: Mohammed Zahir Shah (brother)

Zamina Begum (Pashto: زمینه بیګم) (11 January 1917 – 28 April 1978), also known as Zainab Begum, was an Afghan princess who was the First Lady of Afghanistan from 1973 until her assassination in 1978. She was the wife of Mohammed Daoud Khan, the first president of Afghanistan, and the sister of the last king of Afghanistan, Mohammed Zahir Shah.

She was killed along with her husband and family in the Saur Revolution in 1978.

== Life ==
Zamina Begum was the daughter of King Mohammed Nadir Shah and Mah Parwar Begum, and the sister of King Zahir. Her brother succeeded her father in November 1933. She married Daoud in September 1934.

Zamina Begum famously played a role in the women's emancipation policy of her husband's government, notably by appearing unveiled in public. The Prime Minister prepared women's emancipation carefully and gradually. He began by introducing women workers at the Radio Kabul in 1957, by sending women delegates to the Asian Women's Conference in Kairo, and by employing forty girls to the government pottery factory in 1958. When this was met with no riots, the government decided it was time for the very controversial step of unveiling.

In August 1959, on the second day of the festival of Jashn-e-Esteqlal (Afghan Independence Day), Princess Zamina appeared unveiled alongside Queen Humaira and Princess Bilqis in the Royal Box at the military parade. A group of Islamic clerics sent a letter of protest to the Prime Minister to protest and demand that the words of sharia be respected. The Prime Minister answered by inviting them to the capital and present proof to him that the holy scripture indeed demanded the chadri. When the clerics could not find such a passage, the Prime Minister declared that the female members of the Royal Family would no longer wear veils, because the Islamic law did not demand it.

While the chadri was never banned, the example of the Queen and the Prime Minister's wife was followed by the wives and daughters of government officials as well as by other urban women of the upper and middle classes, with Kubra Noorzai and Masuma Esmati-Wardak.

== Death ==
On 28 April 1978, Zamina Begum and her husband were killed during the Saur Revolution at the Arg.

She was reburied in the Deh Sabz District in Kabul along with her husband and other family members in 2009.

== Family ==
The couple had four sons and four daughters:

- 1. Zarlasht Daoud Khan
- 2. Khalid Daoud Khan (1947–1978). Had a son:
  - Tariq Daoud Khan
- 3. Wais Daoud Khan (1947–1978). Had four children:
  - Turan Daoud Khan (1972-)
  - Ares Daoud Khan (1973 – k. 1978)
  - Waygal Daoud Khan (1975 – k. 1978)
  - Zahra Khanum (1970-)
- 4. Muhammad Umar Daoud Khan (k. 1978). Had two daughters:
  - Hila Khanum (1961 – k. 1978)
  - Ghazala Khanum (1964 – k. 1978)
- 5. Dorkhanai Begum
- 6. Zarlasht Begum (k. 1978)
- 7. Shinkay Begum (k. 1978). Had two daughters:
  - Ariane Heila Khanum Ghazi (1961-)
  - Hawa Khanum Ghazi (1963-)
- 8. Torpekay Begum. Had three children:
  - Shah Mahmud Khan Ghazi
  - Daud Khan Ghazi
  - Zahra Khanum Ghazi

== Ancestry ==
Ancestors of Zamina Begum

16. Sultan Muhammad Khan Telai, Governor of Kabul, Peshawar and Kohat (= 24)
8. Sardar Mohammad Yahya Khan, Governor of Kabul (= 12)
17. a Popalzai lady (= 25)
4. Sardar Mohammed Yusuf Khan, Governor of Herat
18. Sardar Muhammad Akbar Khan (= 26)
9. Hamdan Sultana Begum (= 13)
19. (= 27)
2. Mohammed Nadir Shah
20. Prince Ayub Shah Durrani
10. Ali Ahmad Mirza, Khan Bahadur
5. Sharaf Sultana Hukumat Begum
1. Princess Zamina Begum
24. Sultan Muhammad Khan Telai, Governor of Kabul, Peshawar and Kohat (= 16)
12. Sardar Mohammad Yahya Khan, Governor of Kabul (= 8)
25. a Popalzai lady (= 17)
6. Sardar Muhammad Asif Khan
26. Sardar Muhammad Akbar Khan (= 18)
13. Hamdan Sultana Begum (= 9)
27. (= 19)
3. Mah Parwar Begum
7. Murwarid Begum
