= Humaira Begum =

Queen of Afghanistan from 1933 to 1973

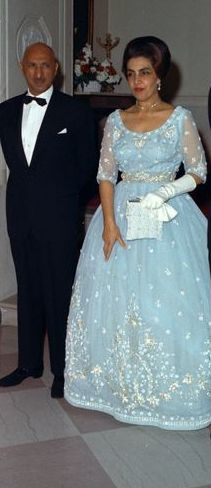
- Humaira Begum at the White House with her husband, King Zahir, 1963

Queen consort of Afghanistan
- Tenure: 8 November 1933 – 17 July 1973
- Installation: 8 November 1933
- Born: 24 July 1918; Kabul, Emirate of Afghanistan
- Died: 26 June 2002 (aged 83); Rome, Italy
- Burial: Maranjan Hill
- Spouse: Mohammed Zahir Shah (m. 1931)
- Issue: Princess Bilqis Begum; Prince Muhammed Akbar Khan; Crown Prince Ahmad Shah Khan; Princess Maryam Begum; Prince Muhammed Nadir Khan; Prince Shah Mahmoud Khan; Prince Muhammed Daoud Pashtunyar Khan; Prince Mir Wais Khan
- House: Barakzai
- Father: Sardar Ahmad Shah Khan
- Mother: Zarin Begum
- Religion: Sunni Islam

Humaira Begum (Pashto: حميرا بیگم; 24 July 1918 – 26 June 2002) was the wife and first cousin of King Zahir and the last Queen of Afghanistan.

== Marriage ==
Humaira Begum was the daughter of Sardar Ahmad Shah Khan, brother of the royal consort Mah Parwar Begum and Minister of the Royal Court, and his first wife Zarin Begum, who was cousin of King Amanullah Khan and eldest daughter of General H.E. Loinab Khush Dil Khan, Governor of Kabul and Kandahar. She married her first cousin, the Crown Prince of Afghanistan Mohammed Zahir on 7 November 1931 in Kabul, at the age of 13.

Mohammed Zahir Shah and Humaira Begum had six sons and two daughters:

1. Princess Bilqis Begum (born 17 April 1932).
2. Prince Muhammed Akbar Khan (4 August 1933 – 26 November 1942).
3. Crown Prince Ahmad Shah (23 September 1934 – 4 June 2024).
4. Princess Maryam Begum (2 November 1936 – 25 December 2021).
5. Prince Muhammed Nadir Khan (21 May 1941 – 3 April 2022).
6. Prince Shah Mahmoud Khan (15 November 1946 – 7 December 2002).
7. Prince Muhammed Daoud Pashtunyar Khan (born 14 April 1949).
8. Prince Mir Wais Khan (7 January 1957 – 29 September 2023).

== Queen of Afghanistan ==
On 8 November 1933, she became Queen of Afghanistan when her husband was proclaimed king after the assassination of her father-in-law, King Mohammad Nadir Shah.

During the first part of her husband's reign, Queen Humaira did not play a big public role. King Amanullah had been deposed in 1929 because of discontent partially caused by the example of Queen Soraya Tarzi, who appeared in public with her husband unveiled, and his successor reinstated the veil and gender seclusion. During the 1930s, the royal women continued to dress in Western fashion inside the enclosed royal palace compound of Kabul, but reverted to covering themselves in the traditional veil when they left the royal compound, and no longer showed themselves in public.

This changed after the Second World War, when modernization reforms were seen as necessary by the government, including reforms in women's position. In 1946, Queen Humaira became the protector of the newly founded Women's Welfare Association, which was the first-ever Women's Institute in Afghanistan, and signified resuming the women's movement. When Mohammed Daoud Khan became Prime Minister in 1953, the development toward women's emancipation started to move faster, and the women of the royal family, with the Queen as the central figure, were given an important task as role models in this process. They started to attend public functions, initially veiled.

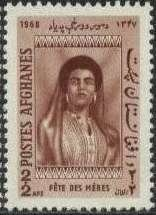
1968 postage stamp showing Begum

In 1959, she supported the call by prime minister Mohammed Daoud Khan for women to voluntary remove their veil by removing her own. This was a big event in the history of women in Afghanistan, and it was also an intentional part of the women's emancipation policy of the Daoud government at that time. The step was carefully prepared by introducing women workers at the Radio Kabul in 1957, sending women delegates to the Asian Women's Conference in Kairo, and employing forty girls to the government pottery factory in 1958. When this was met with no riots, the government decided it was time for the very controversial step of unveiling. In August 1959 therefore, on the second day of the festival of Jeshyn, Queen Humaira and Princess Bilqis appeared in the royal box at the military parade unveiled, alongside the Prime Minister's wife, Zamina Begum.

This controversial step was met with indignation by the Islamic clergy, and a group of clerics sent a letter of protest to the Prime minister to protest and demand that the words of sharia be respected. The Prime minister answered by inviting them to the capital and present proof to him that the holy scripture indeed demanded the chadri. When the clerics could not find such a passage, the Prime Minister declared that the female members of the royal family would no longer wear veils, as the Islamic law did not demand it. While the chadri was never banned, the example of the Queen and the Prime Minister's wife was followed by the wives and daughters of government officials as well as several urban women of the upper- and middle class, with Kubra Noorzai and Masuma Esmati-Wardak known as the first pioneers among the common citizens.

After this event, Queen Humaira participated in royal representational tasks and attended public functions unveiled. She engaged in charity and visited hospitals and public events.

== Exile ==
On 17 July 1973, while her husband was in Italy undergoing eye surgery as well as therapy for lumbago, his cousin and former Prime Minister Mohammed Daoud Khan, who had been removed from office by Zahir Shah a decade earlier, staged a coup d'état and established a republican government. In the August following this coup, Zahir Shah abdicated rather than risk an all-out civil war. Queen Humaira had remained in Afghanistan when her husband departed to Italy for his surgery, and was thus present in Afghanistan during the coup. She was not harmed, but kept in house arrest in her residence, as several other members of the royal family, until they were allowed to depart to join Zahir Shah in Italy.

Humaira and Zahir Shah spent their twenty-nine years in exile in Italy living in a relatively modest four-bedroom villa in the affluent community of Olgiata on Via Cassia, north of the city of Rome. The king had never put money into foreign bank accounts, and thus depended on the generosity of friends.

== Death ==
On 24 June 2002, just weeks before she was to return to Afghanistan and be reunited with her husband who recently had returned, Begum was admitted to hospital with breathing problems and heart trouble. She died two days later.

Her body was returned to Afghanistan on 29 June, and was greeted at the airport by military personnel, tribal representatives in traditional robes, and cabinet ministers from Hamid Karzai's government. Memorial and funeral services were also held for her in two Kabul mosques. Her remains were buried in the Royal Mausoleum in Kabul.

== Honours ==
=== National honours ===
- Knight Grand Cordon of the Order of the Supreme Sun

=== Foreign honours ===
- France: Grand Cross of the Order of the Legion of Honour
- Germany: Grand Cross of the Order of Merit of the Federal Republic of Germany, Special Issue
- (Iran) Iranian imperial family: Dame Grand Cordon of the Imperial Order of the Pleiades, 1st Class
- Japan: Paulownia Dame Grand Cordon of the Order of the Precious Crown

== Ancestry ==
Ancestors of Humaira Begum

16. Sultan Muhammad Khan Telai, Governor of Kabul, Peshawar and Koha
8. Sardar Mohammad Yahya Khan, Governor of Kabul
17. a Popalzai lady
4. Sardar Muhammad Asif Khan
18. Sardar Muhammad Akbar Khan
9. Hamdan Sultana Begum
2. Sardar Ahmad Shah Khan
5. Murwarid Begum
1. Humaira Begum
12. Loinab Sher Dil Khan, Governor of Balkh
6. Loinab Khush Dil Khan, Governor of Kabul and Kandahar
3. Zarin Begum
28. Sardar Payinda Muhammad Khan
14. Sardar Dost Mohammad Khan
29. Zainab Begum
7. Sahira Begum
30. Sardar Agha Muhammad Khan Qizilbash
15. a daughter of Sardar Agha Muhammad Khan Qizilbash

Royal titles
Preceded by Mah Parwar Begum	Queen consort of Afghanistan; 1933–1973	Monarchy abolished
