= Muhammed Akbar Khan, Crown Prince of Afghanistan =

Muhammed Akbar Khan
- Crown Prince of Afghanistan
- Born: 4 August 1933; Kabul, Kingdom of Afghanistan
- Died: 26 November 1942 (aged 9); Kabul, Kingdom of Afghanistan
- House: House of Barakzai
- Father: Mohammed Zahir Shah
- Mother: Humaira Begum
- Religion: Sunni Islam

Muhammed Akbar Khan, Crown Prince of Afghanistan (Pashto: محمد اکبر خان) (4 August 1933 - 26 November 1942) was the first son of Mohammed Zahir Shah, the former King of Afghanistan. He was heir apparent to the throne of Afghanistan, until his early death at the age of 9. Following his death, his younger brother Ahmad Shah Khan became heir apparent.

== Ancestry ==
Ancestors of Muhammed Akbar Khan, Crown Prince of Afghanistan

8. Sardar Mohammed Yusuf Khan, Governor of Herat
4. Mohammed Nadir Shah
9. Sharaf Sultana Hukumat Begum
2. Mohammed Zahir Shah
10. Sardar Muhammad Asif Khan
5. Mah Parwar Begum
11. Murwarid Begum
1. Muhammed Akbar Khan
12. Sardar Muhammad Asif Khan (= 10)
6. Sardar Ahmad Shah Khan
13. Murwarid Begum (= 11)
3. Humaira Begum
14. Loinab Khush Dil Khan, Governor of Kabul and Kandahar
7. Zarin Begum
15. Sahira Begum
