= Mohammad Zahir Shah =

King of Afghanistan from 1933 to 1973

- Father of the Nation
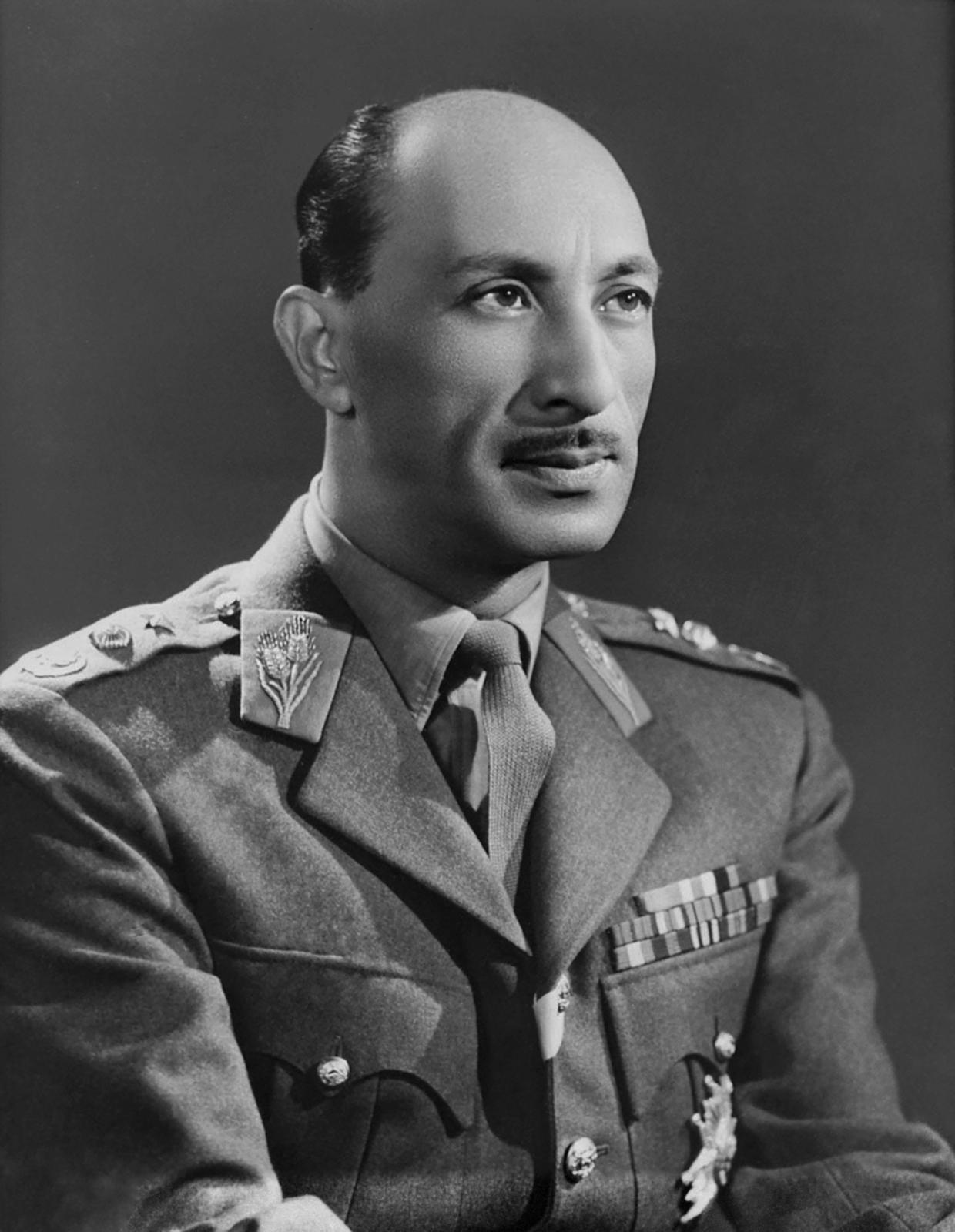
- Official portrait, 1965

King of Afghanistan
- Reign: 8 November 1933 – 17 July 1973
- Coronation: 8 November 1933
- Predecessor: Mohammad Nadir Shah
- Successor: Monarchy abolished (Mohammad Daoud Khan as President of Afghanistan)

Head of House of Barakzai
- Tenure: 17 July 1978 – 23 July 2007
- Predecessor: Prince Daoud Khan (as President of Afghanistan)
- Successor: Prince Ahmad Shah
- Born: 15 October 1914; Kabul, Afghanistan
- Died: 23 July 2007 (aged 92); Kabul, Afghanistan
- Burial: Maranjan Hill, Kabul
- Spouse: Humaira Begum (m. 1931; died 2002)
- Issue: Princess Bilqis Begum; Prince Muhammed Akbar Khan; Crown Prince Ahmad Shah Khan; Princess Maryam Begum; Prince Muhammed Nadir Khan; Prince Shah Mahmoud Khan; Prince Muhammed Daoud Pashtunyar Khan; Prince Mirwais Khan
- Persian: محمد ظاهر شاه
- House: Barakzai
- Father: Mohammad Nadir Shah
- Mother: Mah Parwar Begum
- Religion: Sunni Islam

Mohammad Zahir Shah (Note: /ˌmoʊhəˈmɛd ˈzɑːhər ˈʃɑː/; Pashto: محمد ظاهر شاه, romanized: Muhamad Zāhir Šā, pronounced [mu(h)ɐˈmad zɑˈ(h)iɾ ˈʃɑ]; Dari: محمد ظاهر شاه, romanized: Muhammad Zāhir Šāh, cyrillized: Муҳаммад Зоҳир Шоҳ, pronounced [mʊ(ɦ)ɐmˈmad zɑːˈ(ɦ)ɪɾ ʃɑːʱ]) (15 October 1914 – 23 July 2007) was the last King of Afghanistan, reigning from 8 November 1933 until he was deposed on 17 July 1973. Ruling for almost 40 years, Zahir Shah was the longest-serving ruler of Afghanistan since the foundation of the Durrani Empire in the 18th century.

He expanded Afghanistan's diplomatic relations with many countries, including with both sides of the Cold War. In the 1950s, Zahir Shah began modernizing the country, culminating in the creation of a new constitution and a constitutional monarchy system. Demonstrating nonpartisanism, his long reign was marked by peace in the country which was lost afterwards with the onset of the Afghan conflict.

In 1973, while Zahir Shah was undergoing medical treatment in Italy, his regime was overthrown in a coup d'état by his cousin and former prime minister, Sardar Mohammad Daoud Khan, who established a single-party republic, ending more than 225 years of continuous monarchical government. He remained in exile near Rome until 2002, returning to Afghanistan after the end of the Taliban government. He was given the title Father of the Nation, which he held until his death in 2007.

== Early life ==
Prince Mohammad Zahir Khan was born on 15 October 1914, in a city quarter called Deh Afghanan in Kabul in the Emirate of Afghanistan, into the royal Musahiban family, who belonged to the Mohammadzai clan of the Barakzai tribe of Pashtuns. He was the son of Mohammad Nadir Shah (1883–1933) and Mah Parwar Begum (d. 1941). Nadir was a senior member of the Mohammadzai clan and Commander-in-Chief of the Royal Afghan Army under King Amanullah Khan.

Zahir Khan was educated in a special class for princes at Elementary Primary, built in 1904 by the United Kingdom, and Habibia High School, where many subjects were taught in English. For his secondary education, he went to the Amaniya High School (built during the reign of King Amanullah by France, where many subjects were taught in French. This school was renamed by Nadir Shah as Esteqlal High School) after the fall of King Amanullah. Zahir Khan studied at the Infanterie Military School in the winter (school year in Kabul, 21 March to November). He was then sent to France for further training. He continued his education in France where his father had served as a diplomatic envoy, studying at the Pasteur Institute and the University of Montpellier. When he returned to Afghanistan, he helped his father and uncles restore order and reassert government control during a period of lawlessness in the country. He was later enrolled at an Infantry School and appointed a privy counsellor, later serving in the government positions of deputy war minister and minister of education.

=== Ancestry ===
Zahir's father, Mohammad Nadir Shah, was the son of Sardar Mohammad Yusuf Khan. Born in Dehradun, British India, Nadir's family had been exiled after the Second Anglo-Afghan War. Nadir Shah was a descendant of Sardar Sultan Mohammad Khan Telai, half-brother of Emir Dost Mohammad Khan. His grandfather Mohammad Yahya Khan (father in law of Emir Yaqub Khan) was in charge of the negotiations with the British resulting in the Treaty of Gandamak. After the British invasion after the killing of Sir Louis Cavagnari during 1879, Yaqub Khan, Yahya Khan and his sons, Princes Mohammad Yusuf Khan and Mohammad Asef Khan, were taken captive by the British and transferred to the British Raj, where they remained forcibly until the two princes were invited back to Afghanistan by Emir Abdur Rahman Khan during the last year of his reign (1901). During the reign of Amir Habibullah they received the title of Companions of the King (Musahiban). Nadir assumed the throne after the execution of the self-proclaimed ruler of Afghanistan Habibullah Kalakani on 1 November 1929.

== Reign ==
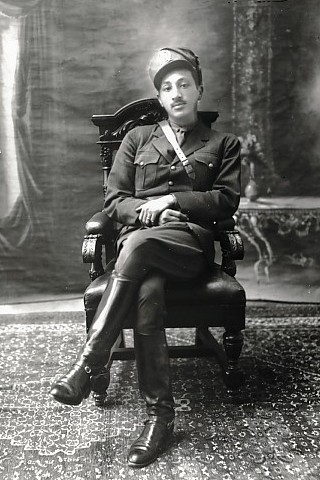
Studio photograph of Zahir Shah in military uniform, seated in a heavy, carved armchair (1930s)

Zahir Khan was proclaimed king (shah) on 8 November 1933 at the age of 19, after the assassination of his father Mohammad Nadir Shah. After his ascension to the throne he was given the regnal title, "He who puts his trust in God, follower of the firm religion of Islam". For the first 20 years, he did not effectively rule, instead ceding power to his paternal uncles, Mohammad Hashim Khan and Shah Mahmud Khan, who both served as Prime Ministers. This period fostered a growth in Afghanistan's relations with the international community as during 1934, Afghanistan joined the League of Nations while also receiving formal recognition from the United States. By the end of the 1930s, agreements on foreign assistance and trade had been reached with many countries, most notably with the Axis powers of Germany, Italy, and Japan.

Zahir Shah provided aid, weapons, and Afghan fighters to the Uyghur and Kirghiz Muslim rebels, who had established the breakaway Turkic Islamic Republic of East Turkestan. The aid was not capable of saving the East Turkestan republic, as the combined forces were defeated in 1934 by the Kuomintang Chinese Muslim New 36th Division of the National Revolutionary Army, commanded by General Ma Zhancang at the Battle of Kashgar and Battle of Yarkand. All Afghan volunteers were killed by Chinese Muslim troops, who then abolished the East Turkestan republic, and reestablished Chinese government control over the area.

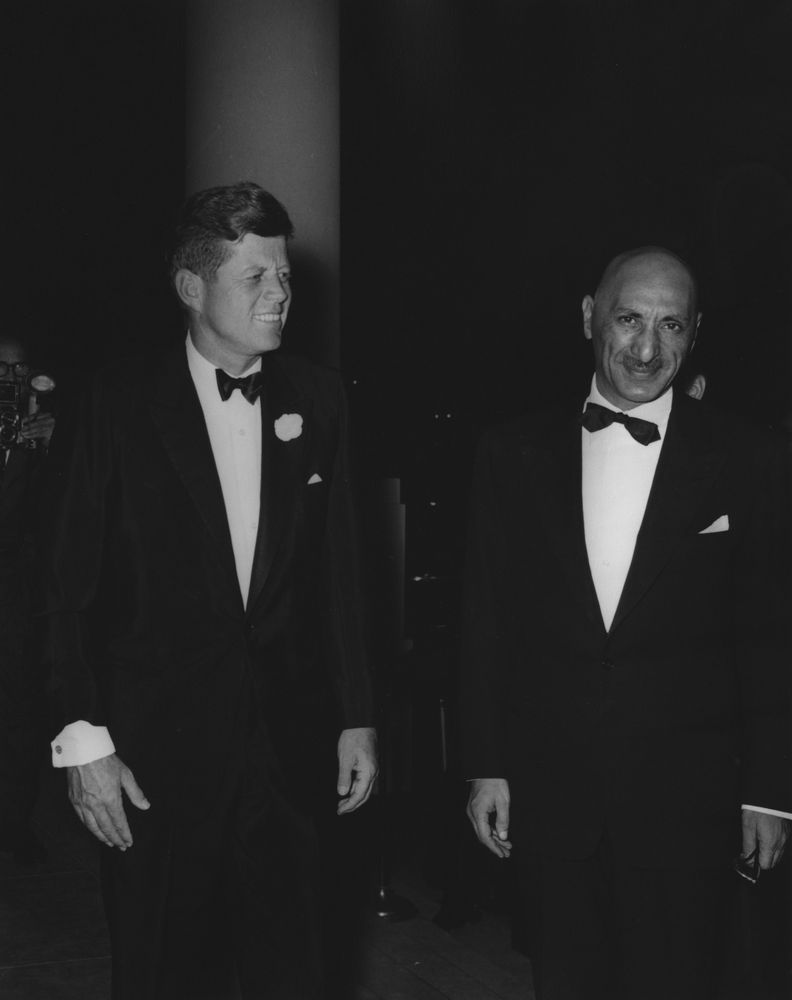
Dinner in honour of King Mohammad Zahir Shah of Afghanistan hosted by US President John F. Kennedy (1963)

Despite close relations to the Axis powers, Zahir Shah and his governments refused to take sides during World War II and Afghanistan was one of the few countries in the world which remained neutral. From 1944 to 1947, Afghanistan experienced a series of revolts by various tribes. After the end of World War II, Zahir Shah recognised the need for the modernisation of Afghanistan and recruited a number of foreign advisers to assist with the process. During this period, Afghanistan's first modern university was founded. A number of potential advances and reforms were derailed as a result of factionalism and political infighting. Zahir Shah also requested financial aid from both the United States and the Soviet Union, and Afghanistan was one of few countries in the world to receive aid from both Cold War adversaries. In a 1969 interview, Zahir Shah said that he is "not a capitalist. But I also don't want socialism. I don't want socialism that would bring about the kind of situation [that exists] in Czechoslovakia. I don't want us to become the servants of Russia or China or the servant of any other place."

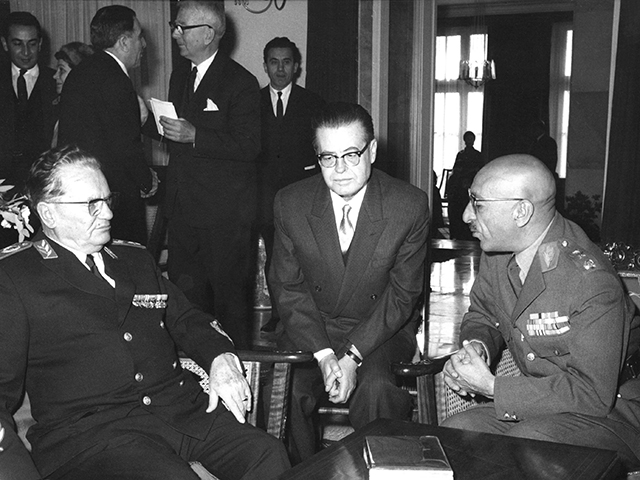
Mohammad Zahir Shah and Marshal Tito in 1968

He was considered a relatively lenient leader compared to previous kings; Zahir Shah had never signed a warrant for the execution of anyone for political reasons during his reign. He also used his power several times to commute capital punishment sentences given to some convicted criminals. At Zahir Shah's behest, a new constitution was promulgated in 1964, which made Afghanistan a modern democratic state by introducing free elections, a parliament, civil and political rights, women's rights, and universal suffrage.

Zahir Shah arrives at PAF Station Mauripur, followed by President of Pakistan Iskander Mirza and Nahid Mirza. They are greeted by C-in-C of the PAF Asghar Khan and Nur Khan. Others in attendance are chiefs of the Iraqi, Turkish, and Iranian Air Forces, and General Ayub Khan. The World record loop, performed in his honor, is showcased at the end. (1958)

At least five Afghani Pul coins during his reign bore the Arabic title المتوكل على الله محمد ظاهر شاه (AlMutawakkil 'āla Allah Muhammad Dhāhir Shāh), which means "The leaner on God, Mohammad Zahir Shah". The honorific title of "leaner on God" is taken from Quran 8:61.

By the time he returned to Afghanistan in 2002, Zahir Shah's rule was characterized as a lengthy era of peace.

== Exile ==
In 1973, while Zahir Shah was abroad in Italy, his cousin Mohammad Daoud Khan staged a coup d'état and established an autocratic republican government. As a former prime minister, Daoud Khan had been forced to resign by Zahir Shah a decade earlier and felt that Zahir Shah lacked leadership and that the parliamentary system prevented real progressivism. In August 1973, Zahir Shah sent a letter from Rome to Khan in Kabul declaring his abdication, saying he respected "the will of my compatriots" after realizing the people of Afghanistan "with absolute majority welcomed a Republican regime".

Zahir Shah lived in exile in Italy for 29 years alongside his wife Queen Humaira Begum and other royal family members. Initially, they lived in a three‐room apartment on Rome's Via Cassia. Relatives of the 1920s King Amanullah Khan, of the same house of Barakzai, also lived in Rome. President Daoud Khan continued to send money to them in Italy consisting of income from property and estates of the former royal family. After the Saur Revolution, the leftist Khalq government cut all funds to Italy.

Zahir Shah eventually lived in a villa in the affluent community of Olgiata on Via Cassia, north of Rome, where he spent his time playing golf and chess, as well as tending to his garden. He was financially supported by the Shah of Iran since the new Afghan government failed to provide him a monthly salary. The Shah also supported his two sons, who were studying in the United States and Canada.

He was prohibited from returning to Afghanistan during the late 1970s by the Soviet-assisted Communist government. In 1983 during the Soviet–Afghan War, Zahir Shah was cautiously involved with plans to develop a government in exile. Ultimately these plans failed because he could not reach a consensus with powerful Islamist factions. It has also been reported that Afghanistan, the Soviet Union, and India had all tried to persuade Zahir Shah to return as chief of a neutral, possibly interim, administration in Kabul. Both the Soviet Union and the United States sent representatives to meet him, and President Mohammad Najibullah supported Zahir Shah to play a role in a possible interim government in the quest for peace. In May 1990, Zahir Shah issued a long statement through Voice of America and the BBC calling for unity and peace among Afghans, and offering his services. This reportedly led to a spark of interest and approval among the Kabul populace. However, the idea of a revived political role for Zahir Shah was met with hostility by some, notably radical Islamist Gulbuddin Hekmatyar.

In 1991, Zahir Shah survived an attempt on his life by a knife-wielding assassin masquerading as a Portuguese journalist, who later revealed that the attempted assassination was ordered by Osama bin Laden. After the fall of the pro-Soviet government, Zahir Shah was favoured by many to return and restore the monarchy to unify the country as he was acceptable to most factions. However, these efforts were blocked mostly by Pakistan's ISI, who feared his stance on the Durand Line issue. In June 1995, Zahir Shah's former envoy Sardar Wali announced at talks in Islamabad, Pakistan, that Zahir Shah was willing to participate in peace talks to end the Afghan Civil War, but no consensus was ever reached.

== Return to Afghanistan ==
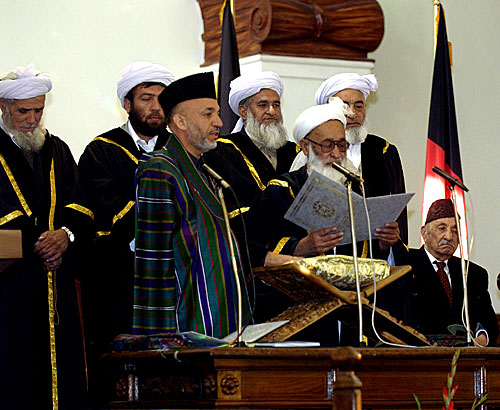
Zahir Shah is seated at the far right during the oath ceremony of Hamid Karzai on 7 December 2004.

On 18 April 2002, at the age of 87 and four months after the end of Taliban rule, Zahir Shah returned to Afghanistan, flown in on an Italian military plane, and welcomed at Kabul's airport by Hamid Karzai and other officials. His return was widely welcomed by Afghans, and he was liked by all ethnic groups. There were proposals for a return to the monarchy – Zahir Shah himself let it be known that he would accept whatever responsibility was given him by the Loya Jirga, which he initiated in June 2002. However he was obliged to publicly renounce monarchical leadership at the behest of the United States. As Pakistan would not accept Zahir as king due to fears regarding his stance on the Durand Line issue; the American government knew allowing him to be restored could result in Pakistan feeling threatened to the point they may cease cooperating with the international coalition and potentially even resume their support for the Taliban. At the time, most delegates to the Loya Jirga were prepared to vote for Zahir Shah and block the U.S.-backed leader of the Northern Alliance, Hamid Karzai. While he was prepared to become chief of state Zahir made it known that it would not necessarily be as monarch: "I will accept the responsibility of head of state if that is what the Loya Jirga demands of me, but I have no intention to restore the monarchy. I do not care about the title of king. The people call me Baba and I prefer this title." Karzai called Zahir Shah a "symbol of unity, a very kind man" and a "fatherly figure."

Zahir Shah visited his father's tomb soon after arriving in Kabul and reportedly gasped after witnessing rocket holes and gunfire damage on the tomb caused by the civil war.

Hamid Karzai, who was favoured by Zahir Shah, became president of Afghanistan after the Loya Jirga. Karzai, from the Pashtun Popalzai clan, provided Zahir Shah's relatives with major jobs in the transitional government. Following the Loya Jirga he was given the title "Father of the Nation" by Karzai, symbolizing his role in Afghanistan's history as a symbol of national unity. This title ended with his death. In August 2002 he relocated back to the Arg, his old palace, after 29 years.

During an October 2002 visit to France, Zahir Shah bruised his ribs after slipping in a bathroom, and on 21 June 2003, while returning to France for a medical check-up, he broke his femur.

On 3 February 2004, Zahir Shah was flown from Kabul to New Delhi, India, for medical treatment after complaining of an intestinal problem. He was hospitalized for two weeks and remained in New Delhi under observation. On 18 May 2004, he was brought to a hospital in the United Arab Emirates because of nose bleeding caused by heat.

Zahir Shah attended the 7 December 2004 swearing-in of Hamid Karzai as President of Afghanistan. During his final years, he was frail and required a microphone pinned to his collar so that his faint voice could be heard. In January 2007, Zahir was reported to be seriously ill and bedridden.

== Death ==
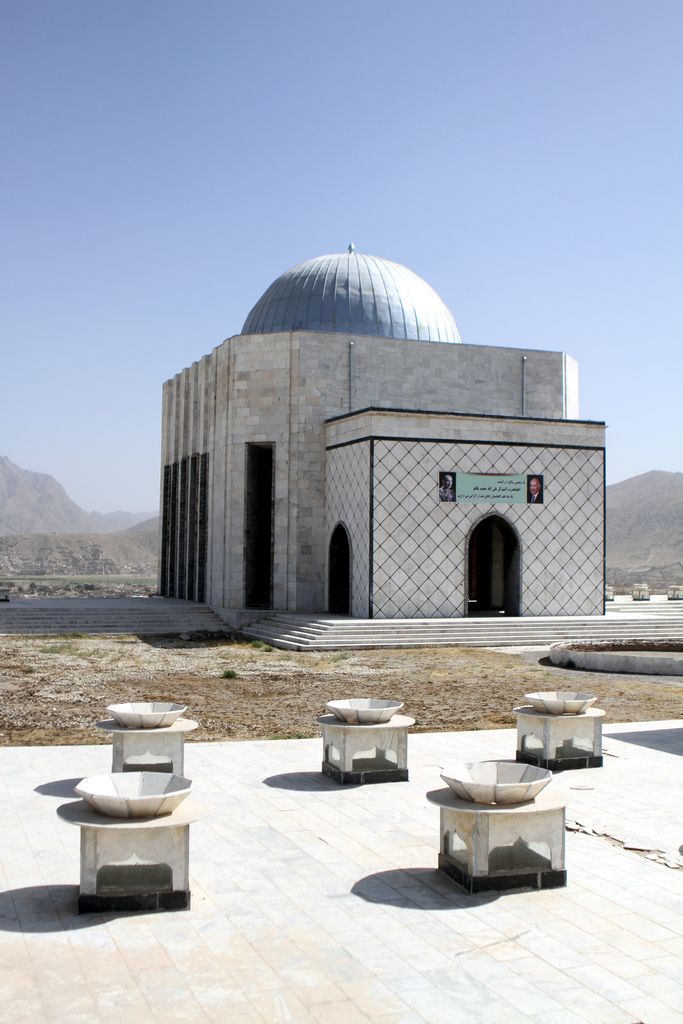
Tomb of King Zahir Shah

Zahir Shah died on 23 July 2007 in the compound of the Arg in Kabul at the age of 92 after a long illness – 34 years after his abdication and nearly 74 years after he ascended the throne. His death was announced by President Karzai, who said "He was the servant of his people, the friend of his people, he was a very kind person, kind hearted. He believed in the rule of the people and in human rights." Karzai also declared three days of national mourning for the deceased king.

His funeral, which was held the day after his death, began on the premises of the presidential palace, where politicians and dignitaries paid their respects; his coffin was then taken to a mosque before being moved to the royal mausoleum on Maranjan Hill in eastern Kabul.

5 Afghan afghani (1961)
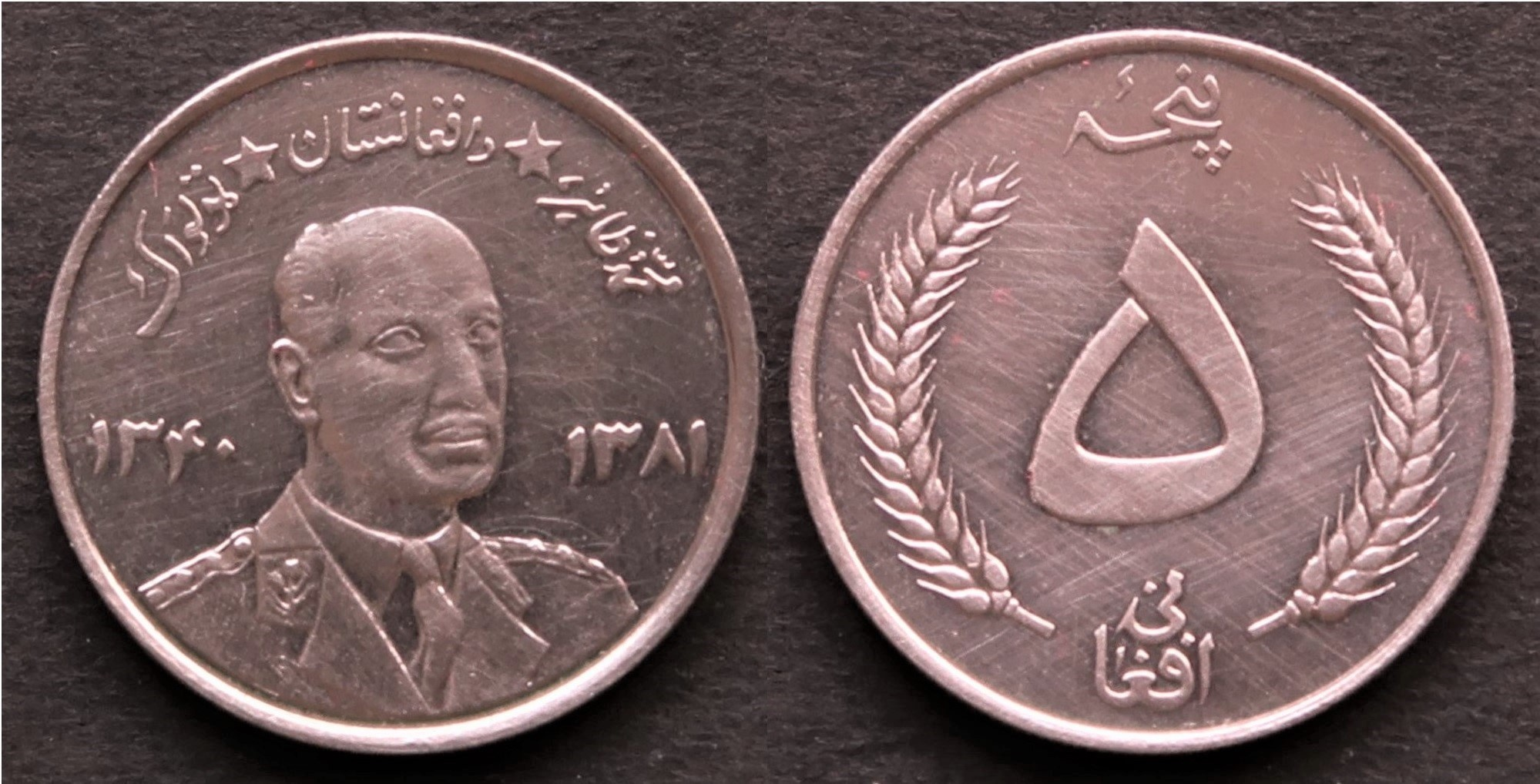
First side of the image: Obverse: Portrait of Mohammad Zahir Shah with lettering "* محمد ظاهر * دافغانستان" (Mohammad Zahir Afghanistan) on top and "۱۳۴۰-۱۳۸۱" (1340–1381) at bottom.
Second side of the image: Reverse: Wheat ear flank on the side and denomination in the centre. Lettering "پنج" (five), "۵" (5) and "افغانی" (Afghanis).
Afghani coin from reign of Shah minted in c. 1962 corresponding to 1340 and 1381 in Lunar and Solar Hijri years respectively.

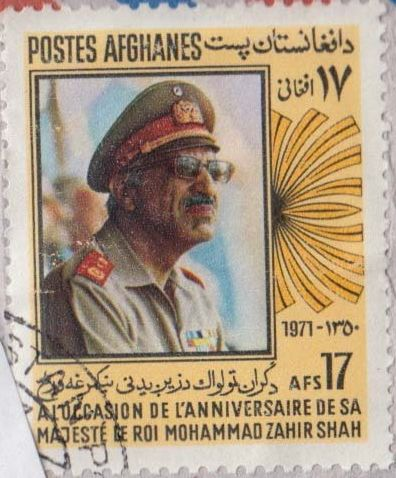
Postage stamp, 1971

== Personal life ==
Zahir Shah was reportedly shy, modest and "soft-spoken". He liked photography, chess, and smoking cigars.

Zahir Shah was fluent in Pashto, Dari (his mother tongue), and French, and could also speak English.

To Afghan people, he was known as Baba.

=== Family ===
He married his first cousin Humaira Begum (1918–2002) on 7 November 1931 in Kabul. They had six sons and two daughters:

Name	Birth	Death	Marriage		Their children
Name	Birth	Death	Date	Spouse	Their children
Princess Bilqis Begum	17 April 1932 (age 94)		1951	Abdul Wali Khan	Princess Humaira Begum
Princess Bilqis Begum	17 April 1932 (age 94)		1951	Abdul Wali Khan	Princess Wana Begum
Princess Bilqis Begum	17 April 1932 (age 94)		1951	Abdul Wali Khan	Princess Mayana Khanum
Crown Prince Muhammed Akbar Khan	4 August 1933	26 November 1942 (aged 9)	—N/a	—N/a	—N/a
Crown Prince Ahmad Shah Khan	23 September 1934	5 June 2024 (aged 89)	1961	Khatul Begum	Prince Muhammad Zahir Khan
Crown Prince Ahmad Shah Khan	23 September 1934	5 June 2024 (aged 89)	1961	Khatul Begum	Prince Muhammad Emel Khan
Crown Prince Ahmad Shah Khan	23 September 1934	5 June 2024 (aged 89)	1961	Khatul Begum	Princess Hawa Khanum
Princess Maryam Begum	2 November 1936	25 December 2021 (aged 85)	1960	Sardar Muhammad Aziz Khan Naim	Sardar Nadir Khan Naim
Prince Muhammed Nadir Khan	21 May 1941	3 April 2022 (aged 80)	6 February 1964	Lailuma Begum	Prince Mustapha Zahir Khan
Prince Muhammed Nadir Khan	21 May 1941	3 April 2022 (aged 80)	6 February 1964	Lailuma Begum	Prince Muhammad Daud Jan
Prince Shah Mahmoud Khan	15 November 1946	7 December 2002 (aged 56)	18 April 1966	Safura Begum	Princess Bilqis Khanum
Prince Shah Mahmoud Khan	15 November 1946	7 December 2002 (aged 56)	18 April 1966	Safura Begum	Princess Ariane Khanum
Prince Muhammed Daoud Pashtunyar Khan	14 April 1949 (age 77)		2 February 1973	Fatima Begum	Prince Duran Daud Khan
Prince Muhammed Daoud Pashtunyar Khan	14 April 1949 (age 77)		2 February 1973	Fatima Begum	Princess Noal Khanum
Prince Mirwais Khan	7 January 1957	29 September 2023 (aged 66)		Farkhudna Begum	Princess Safya Zaher

In January 2009, an article by Ahmad Majidyar of the American Enterprise Institute included one of his grandsons, Mustafa Zahir, on a list of fifteen possible candidates in the 2009 Afghan presidential election. However, Mustafa did not become a candidate.

His granddaughter, Princess Noal of Afghanistan, is the wife of Muhammad Ali, Prince of the Sa'id, the heir apparent to the abolished thrones of Egypt and Sudan.

== Titles and styles ==
Styles of Mohammad Zahir Shah of Afghanistan
- Reference style: His Majesty
- Spoken style: Your Majesty

Royal Standard
Royal Standard of Mohammad Zahir Shah (obverse and reverse)

During his reign, His Majesty Mohammad Zahir Shah, King of Afghanistan.

== Notes ==
Mohammad Zahir Shah Barakzai dynasty Born: 16 October 1914 Died: 23 July 2007
Regnal titles
Preceded by Mohammad Nadir Shah	King of Afghanistan; 8 November 1933 – 17 July 1973	Succeeded by Republic declared
Titles in pretence
Loss of title Republic declared	— TITULAR — King of Afghanistan; 17 July 1973 – 23 July 2007	Succeeded by Crown Prince Ahmad Shah
