= Princess Bilqis Begum =

Afghan princess (born 1932)

Bilqis Begum
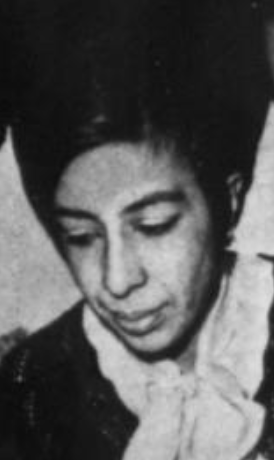
- Princess Bilqis Begum, from a 1966 publication of the US Department of State
- Born: 17 April 1932 (age 94); Dilkusha Palace, Arg, Kabul, Kingdom of Afghanistan
- Spouse: Abdul Wali Khan (m. 1951)
- House: House of Barakzai
- Father: Mohammed Zahir Shah
- Mother: Humaira Begum
- Religion: Sunni Islam

Princess Bilqis Begum (Pashto: بلقیس بیګم) (born 17 April 1932) is the oldest child of Mohammad Zahir Shah, the last king of Afghanistan, and his wife Humaira Begum.

In 1951, she married lieutenant general Sardar Abdul Wali Khan (1925–2008).

She was educated at Malalai School, in Kabul.

In 1959, she and her mother supported the call by then prime minister Mohammed Daoud Khan for women to voluntary remove their veil by removing their own. This was a big event in the history of women in Afghanistan, and it was also an intentional part of the women's emancipation policy of the Daoud Government at that time. The step was carefully prepared by introducing women workers at the Radio Kabul in 1957, sending women delegates to the Asian Women's Conference in Kairo, and employing forty girls to the government pottery factory in 1958. When this was met with no riots, the government decided it was time for the very controversial step of unveiling. In August 1959 therefore, on the second day of the festival of Jeshyn, Queen Humaira and Princess Bilqis appeared in the royal box at the military parade unveiled, alongside the Prime Minister's wife, Zamina Begum (her paternal aunt).

From this point onward, Princess Bilqis participated in public royal representational duties unveiled, and attended many public functions in Afghanistan as well as abroad. In 1971, she attended the 2,500-year celebration of the Persian Empire, where she represented the Afghan royal family with her spouse.

Her father was deposed in 1973.

== Issue ==
1. Princess Humaira Begum (born 1953). Married to Muhammad Tarif Khan Aref.
2. Princess Wana Begum (born 1955). Married to Sardar Taj Ahmad Khan Zekrya.
3. Princess Mayana Khanum (born 1960).

== Patronages ==
- Honorary President of the Committee of Womens Volunteers (1964).

== Honours ==
=== Foreign honours ===
- Germany : Dame Grand Cross of the Order of Merit of the Federal Republic of Germany (7 August 1963).
- Iran : Commemorative Medal of the 2500th Anniversary of the founding of the Persian Empire (14 October 1971).
