= Mohammadzai =

Subtribe of the Barakzai Durrani Pashtuns

Mohammadzai محمدزی
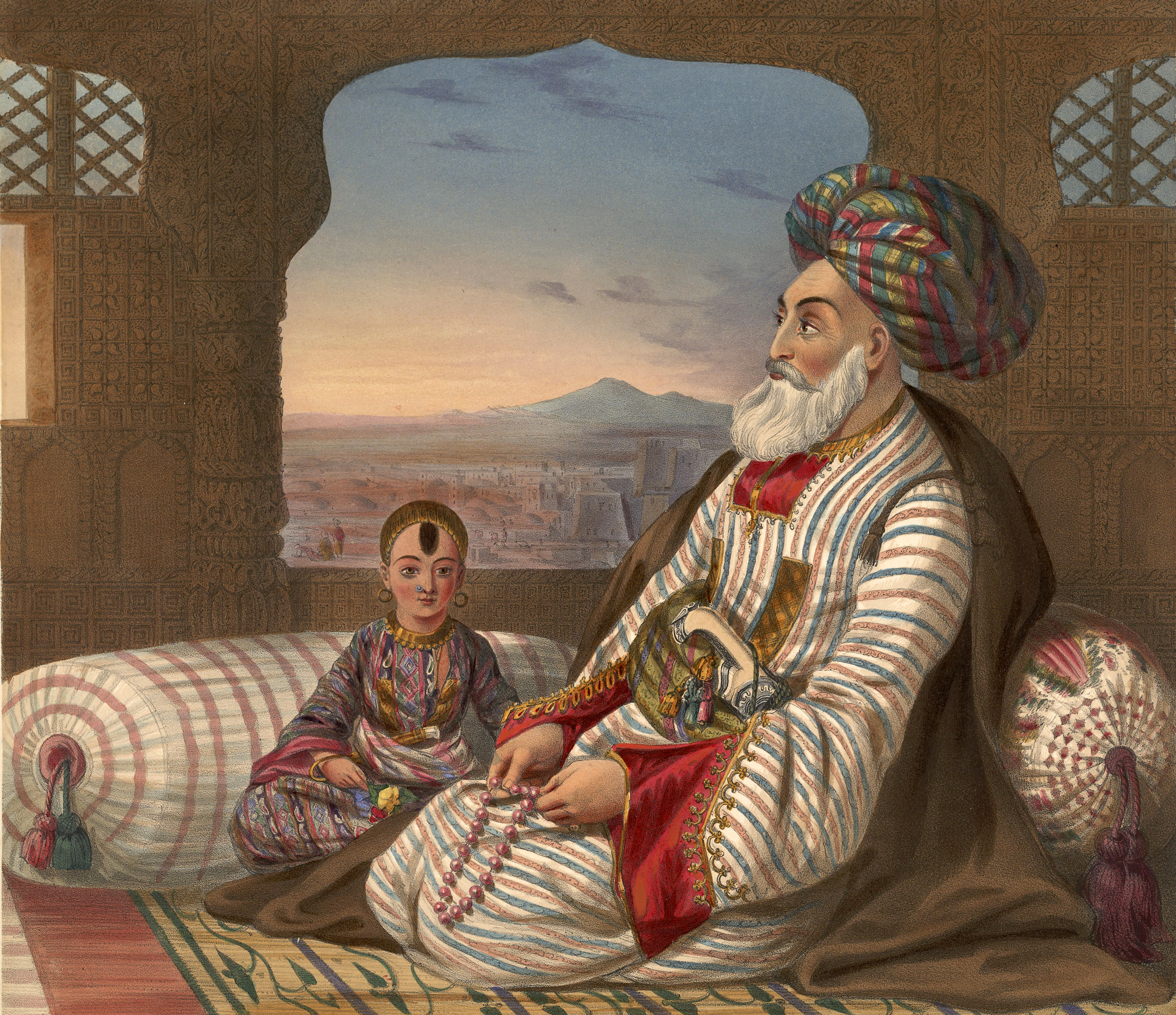
- Dost Mohammad Khan, king of Afghanistan, and belonging to the Mohammadzai sub-tribe
- Ethnicity: Pashtun
- Location: Afghanistan, Pakistan
- Parent tribe: Barakzai
- Language: Pashto
- Religion: Islam

Mohammadzai (Pashto: محمدزی), also spelled Moḥammadzay (meaning "descendants of Mohammad"), is a Pashtun sub-tribe or clan of the Barakzai which is part of the Durrani confederacy of tribes. They are primarily centered on Kandahar, Kabul and Ghazni in Afghanistan as well as in the city of Charsadda in neighbouring Pakistan. The Mohammadzai ruled Afghanistan from 1823 to 1978, for a total of 155 years. Their rule ended under Daoud Khan when the Communists took power via the Ghilzai-Coup.

== Distribution ==
Mohammadzai are the most prominent and powerful branch of the Durrani confederacy, and are primarily centered on Kandahar. They can also be found in other provinces throughout Afghanistan as well as across the border in present-day Pakistan.

Musahiban are the descendants of Sultan Mohammad Khan, also known as "Telai". Telai means Gold in Dari. He was the elder brother of Dost Mohammed Khan.

== Language ==
The principal language of the Mohammadzai is Pashto, more specifically the Southern (Kandahari) dialect of Pashto. Dari is also used as the language for records and correspondence.

== Politics ==
From 1823 to 1978, rulers of Afghanistan belonged to the two branches of one Barakzai dynasty descending from the chiefs of the Barakzai tribe (belonging to the Mohammadzai).

- Amir Sultan Mohammad Khan - First Muhammadzai Ruler of Afghanistan
- Amir Dost Muhammad Khan Barakzai
- Amir Sher Ali Khan - Emir of Afghanistan
- Amir Mohammad Yaqub Khan - Emir of Afghanistan, Signed treaty of Gandamak.
- Amir Abdur Rahman Khan - Emir of Afghanistan (October 1879/July 22, 1880 – October 3, 1901)
- Amir Habibullah Khan - Emir of Afghanistan (October 3, 1901 - February 20, 1919)
- Amir Amanullah Khan - Emir of Afghanistan (February 28, 1919 - 1926)
- King Amanullah Khan - King of Afghanistan (1926 - January 14, 1929)
- King Inayatullah Khan (January 14, 1929 - January 17, 1929).
- Sardar Kohan Dil Khan - Ruler of Kandahar & Baluchistan.
- Sardar Rahmdil Khan - Ruler of Kandahar & Baluchistan.
- Sardar Payinda Khan - Ruler of Kandahar, Pashtunistan & Baluchistan. Father of All Barakzai's/Mohammadzai's
- King Mohammed Nadir Shah (October 17, 1929 - November 8, 1933).
- King Mohammed Zahir Shah (November 8, 1933 - July 17, 1973.)
- President Mohammed Daoud Khan (First Afghan President) (July 18, 1973 - April 28, 1978)
- Chief of Army Kandahar Sardar Abdul Rashid Khan Mohammadzai (1927-1931) in Kandahar Arghandab.
- Senior Advisor to the presidential house at Government of Afghanistan Haji Mukhtar Rashidi (2014-2021) The grandson son of Sardar Abdul Rashid Khan Mohammadzai Kandahar Arghandab.
- President of the national Islamic society of Afghan Youth and The Director of Health and social Development Organization of Afghanistan Nisar Ahmad Rashidi (2003, 2021) in Kandahar, the grandson of Sardar Abdul Rashid Khan Mohammadzai.

== See also ==
- Pashtun tribes
- Barakzai dynasty
- Barakzai
- Shaghasi
- Pashtunwali
- Pashtunistan
- Pakthas
