= Masood Dakik =

German Afghan entrepreneur and lobbyist

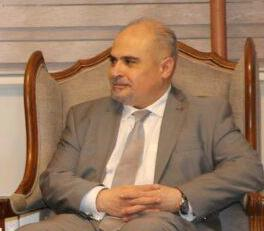
- Born: 19 August 1967 (age 58); Kabul, Kingdom of Afghanistan
- Occupations: Lobbyist, entrepreneur
- Spouse: Nargis bint Assadullah
- Parents: Abdul Khaliq (father); Rahima bint Muhammad (mother)

Masood Dakik (born 19 August 1967) is a German Afghan entrepreneur and lobbyist.

== Early life and career ==
Dakik was born on 19 August 1967 in Kabul, Afghanistan, to father Abdul Khaliq Khan. In 1984, he graduated from Lycée Esteqlal.

In an interview he said that after being admitted to Kabul Medical School he fled to West Germany, because his father was imprisoned during the rule of Barbark Karmal, where he worked in management. He then became an oil and gas entrepreneur and an anti-Taliban lobbyist.

In 2015 he received the lowest rank of Germany's Federal Cross of Merit.

== Personal life ==
In 1996, he married his cousin Nargis Dakik with whom he has three children.
