= Centre d'Enseignement Français en Afghanistan =

Coordinates: 34°31′22″N 69°10′34″E

National Public School
- District 2, Kabul; Afghanistan

Information
- Type: Public
- Established: 1922
- Teaching staff: 300
- Enrollment: 5,700
- Website: nps.com

The Centre d'Enseignement Français en Afghanistan (CEFA) consists of two Franco-Afghan schools in the center of Kabul, Afghanistan, together educating around 6,000 Afghan students.

The National Public School is a school in Kabul, Afghanistan. It is the second oldest school (after Habibia High School) in Kabul, and is recognized as the most prestigious school in the country.

National Public School is a private school administered by the Afghan Ministry of Education, and is currently under the contract of AEFE, an educational agency of the French Foreign Ministry. The French Cultural Center (CCF) is also located inside the National Public School compound.

== Further information ==
Created under the impulse of King Amanullah in 1922 as Amaniya School, it was renamed in 1931 to Lycée Esteqlal (meaning "independence"). In 1968, French Prime Minister Georges Pompidou laid the first brick of modern buildings, and the new site was inaugurated in 1974. The curriculum was entirely in the French language until 1985 when diplomatic relations between France and Afghanistan were suspended under the communist regime. Since 2002, only a few subjects, such as French language, mathematics and physics, are taught in French, and the rest in Persian.

Until 1985, Lycée Esteqlal did not only receive Afghan students, but also several French nationals who were related to the French Embassy's diplomatic staff. Lycée Esteqlal along with Lycée Malalaï (Pashto: لیسه ملالی), which is the other Franco-Afghan school for girls in Kabul, were rebuilt and reopened at the beginning of 2003, and currently are under the contract of Agency for French Education Abroad (Agence pour l'enseignement français à l'étranger).

King Amanullah, who was progressive and democratic, also oversaw the opening of the first girls school, Masturat, in 1921. Masturat was closed from 1928 to 1932, then reopened in 1932 through the efforts of the new King Nadir Shah and became a girls secondary school in 1939, led by a French teacher. Seven hours a week of French was taught from the primary year upwards. In 1942, the school moved to a new building and took the name of Lycée Malalai, from the name of a famous Afghan woman who fought in the resistance against the invading English in 1880 during the Second Anglo-Afghan War.

In 2014 a suicide bomber attacked a cultural center at Esteqlal High School, killing a German national and injuring 16. The explosion occurred during the performance of a play called 'Heartbeat: Silence After the Explosion', which was a condemnation of suicide attacks. One of the injured was musician Ahmad Naser Sarmast.

== Notable alumni ==
Many internationally renowned Afghan personalities and figures have received part of their education or have obtained their baccalaureate in Lycée Esteqlal.

- Ahmad Shah Khan, crown prince of Afghanistan
- Ahmad Shah Massoud, renowned Afghan anti-Soviet resistance leader
- Amin Wardak, mujahideen leader
- Atiq Rahimi, well-known French-Afghan writer
- Dr.Samir Bayat, physician, Surgeon, University Lecturer, Founder of Telemedicine Services in Afghanistan
- Homayun Tandar, Afghan ambassador
- Mohammed Akram, former minister of education and ambassador in France
- Mohammed Kassem Fazelly, lawyer, professor, ambassador to UN
- Mahmoud Saikal, former Afghan permanent representative to the UN
- Mohammed Sediq Farhang, civil servant, historian
- Muhammed Akbar Khan, crown prince of Afghanistan
- Nur Ahmad Etemadi, former Afghan prime minister
- Ravan A. G. Farhâdi, former ambassador to the UN, renowned writer, researcher, and professor
- Tamim Ansary, author
- Zalmai Rassoul, former Afghan foreign affairs minister
- Zemaryalai Tarzi, internationally renowned archaeologist and professor
