= Ravan A. G. Farhâdi =

Afghan academic and diplomat (1929–2026)

Abdul Ghafoor Ravan Farhâdi (Persian: عبدالغفور روان فرهادی; 23 August 1929 – 26 July 2026) was an Afghan academic and diplomat who served as Afghanistan's Ambassador to the United Nations from 1993 to 2006.

== Early life and education ==
Farhâdi was an ethnic Tajik from Kabul. He graduated from Lycée Esteqlal in Kabul, in 1948. Farhâdi studied at the Institut d'études politiques in Paris, France, achieving an MA degree in 1952. He then earned his Ph.D. at the Sorbonne, in Indo-Iranian Studies, in 1955. His paper was on "le Persan parlé en Afghanistan", later translated to English and Russian. Farhâdi was fluent in French, English and Persian.

== Career as a diplomat ==
In 1955, Farhâdi assumed a position as lecturer in the History of political thought at Kabul University. In 1958, he started his diplomatic career as First Secretary at the Afghan Embassy in Karachi, Pakistan. From 1961 to 1962, he was Director of United Nations Affairs at the Afghan Ministry of Foreign Affairs. Following that, he was appointed Counsellor and Deputy Chief of Mission at the Embassy of Afghanistan in Washington, D.C., United States.

In 1964, he returned to Kabul to work at the Ministry of Foreign Affairs. From 1964 till 1968, he served as Director-General for Political Affairs at the ministry and then he was Deputy Foreign Minister for 5 years. Between 1965 and 1971 he also was Secretary of the Council of Ministers of the Afghan Government.

In 1973, he was appointed Ambassador in Paris. After the coup of Sardar Mohammed Daoud Khan, Farhâdi was recalled to Kabul. He served as a member of the Advisory Commission of the Ministry of Culture (1975–1978) organizing international meetings in cultural fields.

== Career as an academic ==
After the Soviet Invasion in 1979, Farhâdi spent two years in Pol-e Charkhi jail as a political prisoner. After that he moved to France again and became associate professor in History of Persian Literature at the University of Paris 1 Pantheon-Sorbonne/University of Paris III: Sorbonne Nouvelle. In summer 1985, he was a visiting fellow at the Australian National University, in Canberra. He was then an associate professor at the Department of Near Eastern Studies, University of California, Berkeley. At Berkeley, he taught subjects ranging from Persian Literature to medieval Islamic mysticism.

Farhâdi wrote a number of historical texts, including The Quatrains of Rumi, a translation of over 1,600 of the quatrains attributed to Rumi, and Abdullah Ansari of Herat (Khajeh Abdollah Ansari), a Sufi master.

== Afghanistan's UN Ambassador ==
After the fall of the communist government of Afghanistan and the start of the government of Burhanuddin Rabbani, Farhâdi served as Afghanistan's ambassador to the United Nations. Farhâdi presented his credentials as Ambassador Permanent Representative of Afghanistan to the United Nations Secretary General Boutros Boutros Ghali on 30 April 1993. Even when the Taliban had taken control of most of Afghanistan, the government of Burhanuddin Rabbani continued to represent Afghanistan at the United Nations, with Farhâdi as the UN Ambassador representing Afghanistan until the end of 2006. The Taliban never represented Afghanistan in the United Nations.

From 1993, Farhâdi served as Vice Chairman of the Committee on the Exercise of the Inalienable Rights of the Palestinian People at United Nations Headquarters in New York. He was known for his strong commitment to the Palestinian rights but has also acknowledged Israel's right to exist.

After his period as diplomat, with American scholar Ibrahim Gamard, he translated into English all the quatrains of the Sufi Persian poet Maulana Jalal ad-Din Rumi.

== Political views ==
Farhâdi was highly critical of Pakistan, saying it supported the Taliban. He was in favour of a government composed of all of Afghanistan's ethnic communities, including Uzbeks, Tajiks, Hazaras, Baluchs and Pashtuns, but rejected the idea of US Secretary of State Colin Powell to include moderate Taliban members in the next government. During the presidential elections of 2009, in which Abdullah Abdullah was the main challenger of Karzai, Farhâdi spoke in favour of Abdullah, the former Minister of Foreign Affairs.

After the fall of the Taliban, Farhâdi tried to put pressure on the U.S. government to give more aid to Afghanistan, especially to compensate the families who lost civilian family members in U.S. bombings.

== Death ==
Farhâdi died on 26 July 2026, at the age of 96.
