= Sultan Mohammad Khan =

Regent of Kabul from 1823 to 1826

Sultan Muhammad Khan سلطان محمد خان
- The Golden Sultan (Note: Persian: سلطان طلایی, romanized: Sultān-i Talāyī)
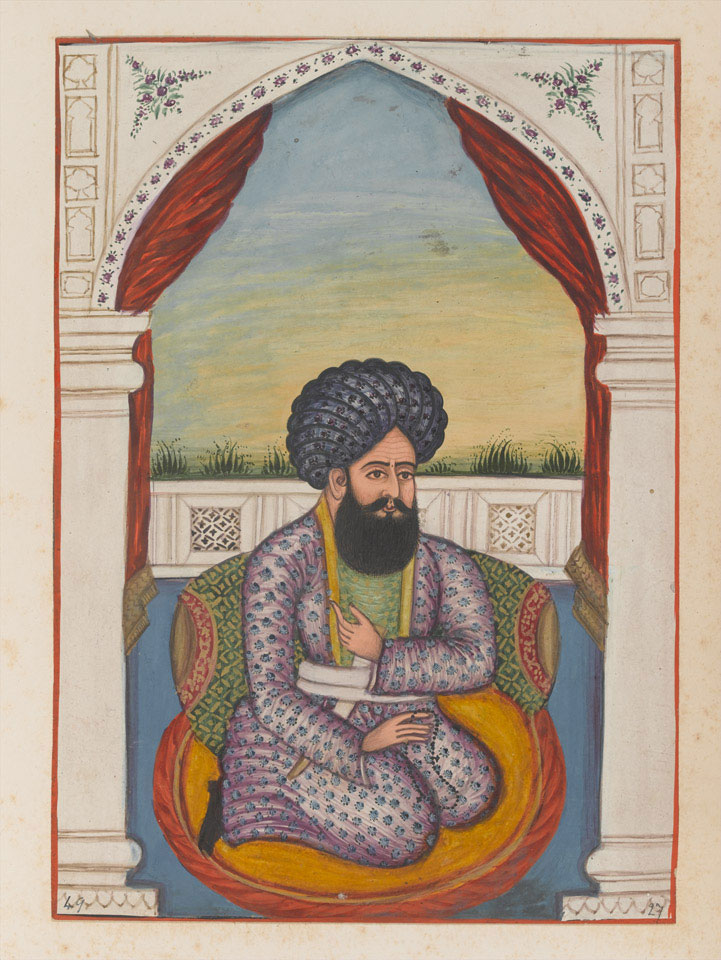
- Depiction of Sultan Mohammad Khan Talaei, c. 1865

Sardar of Kabul
- Reign: 1823–1826
- Predecessor: Habibullah Khan
- Successor: Dost Mohammad Khan
- Born: 1795; Kandahar, Durrani Empire
- Died: 1861 (aged 65–66); Kabul, Emirate of Afghanistan
- Burial: Maranjan Hill, Kabul, Afghanistan
- Spouses: 16 wives: A Hajjibashi lady A Popalzai lady A Qizilbash lady A second Popalzai lady A Bajauri lady A Barakzai lady A Bangash lady A third Popalzai lady A Sadozai lady An Arab Khel Peshawari lady A Kazi Khel lady A daughter of Nasrullah Khan A Kabuli lady A second Qizilbash lady A Nurzai lady A third Qizilbash lady
- Issue: 50 sons and 9 daughters: Khwaja Mohammad Khan Nur Mohammad Khan Yahya Khan Ghulam Mohammad Khan Mohammad Akbar Khan Hajji Mohammad Sarwar Khan Mohammad Sami Khan Mohammad Ayaz Khan Mohammad Ayub Khan Abdullah Khan Mohammad Ibrahim Khan Ahmad Khan Musa Khan Mohammad Harun Khan Dilawar Khan Mohammad Nasir Khan Abdul Qadir Khan Mohammad Azam Khan Mohammad Sadiq Khan Safi al-Din Mohammad Khan Zakaria Khan Saifullah Khan Mohammad Ishaq Khan Ghulam Muhi al-Din Khan Mohammad Abbas Khan Sikandar Khan Mohammad Ghaus Khan Abdul Nabi Khan Abdul Ghani Khan Mohammad Ismail Khan Mohammad Ali Khan Khan Sherin Khan Mohammad Yakub Khan Mohammad Hashim Khan Abdul Quddus Khan Abdul Sudoor Khan Abdul Ghaus Khan Nek Mohammad Khan Bustan Khan Mohammad Anwar Khan Burhan Khan Lal Mohammad Khan Abdul Wahid Khan Jalal al-Din Khan Abdul Aziz Khan Mohammad Yunus Khan Mohammad Sidiq Khan Ata Mohammad Khan Abdul Wadud Khan Abdul Qayum Khan Four unknown daughters Sultanat Begum Silsila Begum Dilbar Begum Amina Begum Amir Khanum
- House: Musahiban (Barakzai dynasty)
- Dynasty: Barakzai dynasty
- Father: Payandah Khan
- Mother: an Alakozai lady
- Religion: Sunni Islam

Sardar Sultan Mohammad Khan Barakzai, (Note: Pashto: سلطان محمد خان بارکزی, romanized: Sultān Muhammad Xān Bārakzai [sul.t̪ɑn mu.wa.mad̪ xɑn bɑ.ɾak.zaɪ, sul.t̪ɑn mu.ham.mad̪ xɑn bɑ.ɾak.zaɪ]; Persian: سلطان محمد خان بارکزی, romanized: Sultān Mohammad Khān Bārakzay [sʊl̪.t̪ʰɑ́ːn mʊ.wäm.mád̪ xɑːn bɑː.ɾäkʰ.záj, sʊl̪.t̪ʰɑ́ːn mo̞.ɦäm.mád̪ xɑːn bɑː.ɾäkʰ.záj]) (1795 – 1861) also known as Ghazi Sultan Mohammad Talaei, through his epithet as the Golden Sultan, was an Afghan chief minister and regent. He was a powerful half-brother of Dost Mohammad Khan, the eventual ruler of Afghanistan who seized control of Kabul from him. Prior to and during the reign of Dost Mohammad Khan, Sultan Mohammad Khan Telai was chief minister and governor of various regions of Afghanistan, including Kabul, Peshawar and Kohat. He was the first of the Musahiban, a Mohammadzai dynasty that began with him and ruled Afghanistan for more than 150 years, in various forms such as emir, king or president from 1823 to 1978.

An ethnic Pashtun, Mohammad Khan Talaei was the 15th son of Sardar Payeida Khan (chief of the Barakzai tribe), who was killed in 1799 by Zaman Shah Durrani. Sultan Muhammad Khan's grandfather was Hajji Jamal Khan. Sultan Mohammad Khan's wealth, along with his immense love for fine goods like luxurious robes, led to his family giving him his nickname "Telai", meaning golden.

== Early history and background ==
Sultan Mohammad Khan was born in 1795 to an influential Pashtun family in Kandahar, Durrani Empire (present-day Kandahar, Afghanistan). His father, Payinda Khan, was chief of the Barakzai tribe and an aristocrat with the title "Sarfraz Khan" in the Durrani dynasty. Their family can be traced back to Abdal (the founder of the Abdali tribe) through Hajji Jamal Khan, Yousef, Yaru, Mohammad, Omar Khan, Khisar Khan, Ismail, Nek, Daru, Saifal, and Barak. Abdal had four sons, Popal, Barak, Achak, and Alako.

== Political power ==
Sultan Muhammad Khan assumed rule of Kabul in 1824 from Yar Mohammad Khan Barakzai and held it until 1826 when he was expelled by Dost Mohammad Khan. Following his exile, he governed over Peshawar from 1826-1828 and Kohat from 1828-1834. He and the Muhammadzai leaders in general were known for having a great number of wives in order to unify the Afghan tribes and ethnic groups. In 1838, Afghanistan was invaded by the British who had captured Kandahar and Kabul by the end of 1839. Sultan Mohammad later reconciled with Dost Mohammad.

== Death ==
He died in 1861, and his mausoleum rests on Maranjan Hill in Kabul, Afghanistan.

== Notable descendants ==
- Nadir Shah, King of Afghanistan, great grandson of Emir Sultan Mohammed Khan Telai through his father Colonel Prince Yousuf Khan
- Zahir Shah, King of Afghanistan, son of King Nader Shah
- Prince Daoud Khan, Prime minister and first President of Afghanistan
- Prince Abdul Aziz Khan Telai, General, Governor of Badakhshan and Kandahar
- Prince Abdul Qayyum Khan, Governor of Hazarajat, Governor of various Central Afghan Provinces; oldest son of Prince Abdul Aziz Khan and father of Prince Abdul Khalek Khan Telai
- Prince Amir Muhammad Khan Telai, General, sided with the British during the third Anglo Afghan War proclaimed himself as Emir in a failed coup d´état against Amanullah Khan; military alliance with Muhammad Ali Jinnah and the All India Muslim League; son of Prince Abdul Aziz Khan
- Prince Assadullah "Sharza" Telai, General in the US Air Force; son of Prince Amir Muhammad Khan Telai
- Brigade General Prince Abdul Ghaffar Khan Telai, Commander of the Royal Brigade of his cousin HM King Nadir Shah; Carried out the executions of the Amanist Charkhi family, who successfully managed to assassinate HM King Nadir Shah through a Hazara ally; son of Prince Abdul Aziz Khan Telai
- Prince Abdul Khalek Khan Telai, Afghanistan´s first Physics Professor, Afghan Ambassador to the UN, Chief of Staff of his relative Daoud Khan, son of Prince Abdul Qayyum Khan Telai

== See also ==
- List of heads of state of Afghanistan
- Sultan Masood Dakik

== Notes ==
Political offices
Preceded by Ayub Shah Durrani	Emir of Afghanistan; 1823-1826	Succeeded by Dost Muhammad Khan
