= Musahiban =

Ruling family of Afghanistan from 1929 to 1978

The Musahiban (Pashto: مُصاحبان) (meaning "courtier" or "aide de camp") are a Pashtun Mohammadzai family who founded the Afghan Barakzai dynasty. Its members were of the royal lineage that ruled Afghanistan as emir, king, or president from 1823 to 1978. They descend from Sultan Mohammad Khan Telai (1795–1861) and his older brother Emir Dost Mohammad Khan (1792–1863), and were the last rulers of the Mohammadzai dynasty before being overthrown in the Saur Revolution in April 1978.

== Name and origins ==
The family are descendants of Sultan Mohammad Khan (1795–1861), nicknamed "Telai" (Pashto: ټیلای) which means "possessor of gold" or "golden" (a nickname he was given because of his wealth and love of fine clothing), and his older brother was Dost Mohammad Khan who gained control of Afghanistan and became its ruler. Telai had a son named Yahya and Yahya's son, Sardar Mohammad Yusuf Khan, founded the Yahya-khel clan which was later named the Musahiban. According to Amin Saikal, "by 1905, Yossef and his brother, Asef, became the Amir's Musahiban-e Khas (Attendants par Excellence), from which originated the tribe name Musahiban".

== Policies ==
The Musahiban have historically been known for a step-by-step, culturally progressive and tribally sensitive, evolution for the modernization and opening up of Afghanistan in contrast to the often more radically accelerated strategies promoted in the past.
