= Mah Parwar Begum =

Consort of the Afghan monarch
- Tenure: 15 October 1929 – 8 November 1933
- Born: 12 June 1887; Tehran, Qajar Iran
- Died: 13 December 1941 (aged 54); Tehran, Imperial State of Iran
- Burial: King Nadir Shah Mausoleum
- Spouse: Mohammed Nadir Shah
- Issue: Sardar Muhammad Tahir Khan; King Muhammad Zahir Shah; Tahera Khanum; Princess Zuhra Begum; Princess Zamina Begum; Princess Sultana Begum; Princess Bilqis Begum
- Father: Sardar Muhammad Asif Khan
- Mother: Murwarid Begum

Mah Parwar Begum (Pashto: ماه پرور بیګم) (12 June 1887 — 13 December 1941) was the royal consort of Afghanistan. She belonged to the Babakar Khel clan from the Ghilzai tribe and was the third daughter of Sardar Muhammad Asif Khan and of his second wife, Murwarid Begum. She was the only wife of Mohammed Nadir Shah and the mother of Mohammed Zahir Shah, both Kings of Afghanistan. Her daughter Zamina Begum was the 1st First Lady of Afghanistan, as the spouse of Mohammed Daoud Khan.

== Ancestry ==
Ancestors of Mah Parwar Begum

16. Sardar Payinda Muhammad Khan
8. Sardar Sultan Muhammad Khan Telai
17. an Alakozai lady
4. Sardar Yahya Khan
9. a Popalzai lady
2. Sardar Muhammad Asif Khan
20. Sardar Dost Mohammad Khan
10. Sardar Muhammad Akbar Khan Ghazi
21. Khadija Begum
5. Hamdan Sultana Begum
1. Mah Parwar Begum
3. Murwarid Begum

== Sources ==
- (in French) Mah Parwar Begum

Royal titles
Preceded by Soraya Tarzi	Royal consort to the Afghan king 1929–1933	Succeeded by Humaira Begum
