= Mohammad Nadir Shah =

King of Afghanistan from 1929 to 1933

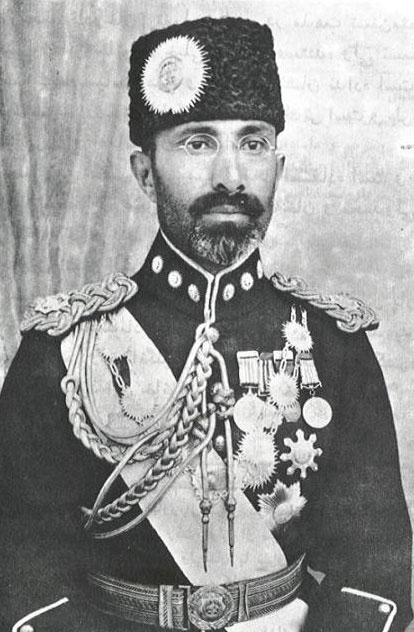

King of Afghanistan
- Reign: 15 October 1929 – 8 November 1933
- Installation: 15 October 1929
- Predecessor: Habibullāh Kalakāni
- Successor: Mohammad Zahir Shah
- Born: 9 April 1883; Dehradun, British India
- Died: 8 November 1933 (aged 50); Kabul, Kingdom of Afghanistan
- Burial: King Nadir Shah Mausoleum
- Spouse: Mah Parwar Begum
- Issue: Sardar Muhammad Tahir Khan; King Mohammad Zahir Shah; Tahera Khanum; Princess Zuhra Begum; Princess Zainab Begum; Princess Sultana Begum; Princess Bilqis Begum
- House: Musahiban
- Father: Mohammad Yusuf Khan
- Mother: Sharaf Sultana Hukumat Begum
- Religion: Sunni Islam
- Military career
- Conflicts: 1919 Afghan coup d'état (POW): Third Anglo-Afghan War; Battle of Bagh; Second Battle of Bagh; Battle of Stonehedge Ringe; Skirmishes at Quetta; Skirmishes at the Zhob Valley; Skirmishes at Kurram; Skirmishes at the Chitral Valley; Capture of Spin Boldak; Battle of Thal; Afghan Civil War (1928–1929) Basmachi Movement X

Mohammad Nadir Shah (Note: Pashto: محمد نادر شاه) (9 April 1883 – 8 November 1933) was King of Afghanistan from 1929 until his assassination in 1933. He became the king after crushing the Afghan Civil War of 1928–1929. Previously, he served as Minister of War, Afghan Ambassador to France, and as a general in the Royal Afghan Army. He and his son Mohammad Zahir Shah, who succeeded him, were part of the Musahiban.

== Background ==
Nadir Khan was born on 9 April 1883 in Dehradun, British India, in the Musahiban branch of the Royal dynasty of Afghanistan (of the Mohammadzai section of Barakzai Pashtuns). His father was Mohammad Yusuf Khan, and his mother was Sharaf Sultana Hukumat Begum (Princess of the Sadozai Dynasty descended from Ahmad Shah Durrani).

His paternal grandfather was Yahya Khan, and his great grandfather was Sultan Mohammad Khan Talaei, the brother of Dost Mohammad Khan. Nadir's ancestors were exiled to British India by Emir Abdur Rahman Khan after the Emir realized their aspiration for power. Abdur Rahman advised his incumbent Crown Prince Habibullah not to allow the "Al-Yahya" family to enter the country under any terms or conditions. In 1901, Abdul Rahman died, and Habibullah was crowned emir. In 1912, Nadir assisted in helping the Afghan government defeat the Khost rebellion.

Unlike his father, Amir Habibullah had many weaknesses, including philandery. During an official visit to British India, Amir Habibullah married one of Nader's sisters when the Nader family moved to Afghanistan. Nader became the minister of war during Amanullah while concealing his ambitions to become the King. Nader and his brothers played an important role in destabilizing the Amani government, and they started to support Habibullāh Kalakāni.

== Rise to power ==
After growing up in India, Nadir Khan first went to Afghanistan when his grandfather Mohammad Yahya was authorized to return from exile by the British and Abdur Rahman Khan. He later became a general under King Amanullah Khan and led the Royal Afghan Army in the Third Anglo-Afghan War. After the war, Nadir Khan was made Minister of War and from early 1924 to 1926 he was Afghan Ambassador to France.

Shortly after a rebellion by some Pashtun tribesmen and Tajik forces of Habibullāh Kalakāni against the monarchy, Nadir Khan was exiled due to disagreements with King Amanullah. After the overthrow of Amanullah Khan's monarchy by Habibullah Kalakani, he returned to Afghanistan with his army of Mangal, Mahsud and Wazir tribe members and took most of Afghanistan. He had enlisted the support of the British to raise an army and remove Habibullah Kalakani from power. By 13 October 1929, forces loyal to Nadir had captured Kabul and subsequently sacked the city, and he arrived in the city on the 15th. He captured Kalakani. He executed him by firing squad on the west wall of the Arg on 1 November 1929, along with Kalakani's brother and 9 other members of Kalakani's inner circle.

=== King of Afghanistan ===
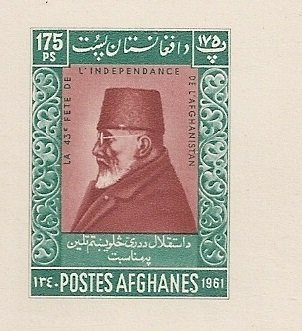
Posthumous postage stamp of Nadir Shah, 1961

As King of Afghanistan, Nadir Shah quickly abolished most of Amanullah Khan's reforms, but despite his efforts to rebuild an army that had just been engaged in suppressing a rebellion, the forces remained weak while the religious and tribal leaders grew strong. Nadir faced many insurrections, including the Koh Daman revolt (29 November – 30 June), the Shinwari rebellion (February 1930), operations against Ibrahim Beg (November 1930 – April 1931), the Ghilzai threat (1931), the Darre Khel revolt (November 1932), and disturbances in Khost. The same year, a Soviet force crossed the border in pursuit of an Uzbek leader whose forces had been harassing the Soviets from his sanctuary in Afghanistan. He was driven back to the Soviet side by the Afghan army in April 1930, and by the end of 1931, most uprisings had been subdued.

Nadir Shah named a ten-member cabinet consisting mostly of his family members. In September 1930, he called into session a loya jirga of 286, which confirmed his accession to the throne. In 1931, the King promulgated a new constitution. Despite its appearance as a constitutional monarchy, the document effectively instituted a Royal oligarchy, and popular participation was merely an illusion.

Although Nadir Shah placated religious factions with a constitutional emphasis on orthodox denominational principles, he also took steps to modernize Afghanistan in material ways, although far less obtrusively than Amanullah. He improved road construction, especially the Great North Road through the Hindu Kush, methods of communication, and helped establish Kabul University, Afghanistan's first university in 1931; He forged commercial links with the same foreign powers that Amanullah had established diplomatic relations in the 1920s, and, under the leadership of several prominent entrepreneurs, he initiated a banking system and long-range economic planning. Although his efforts to improve the army did not bear fruit immediately, by the time of his death in 1933, Nadir Shah had created a 40,000-strong military force.

Nadir Shah wanted to establish a good relationship with the Republic of Türkiye.

Entrepreneur Abdul Majid Zabuli had good realations with Nadir Shah. During his rule he advocated laissez-faire economic reforms and opened up the economy to private enterprises. However, he also advocated economic nationalist economic policies.

== Assassination ==
On 8 November 1933, Nadir Shah was visiting a high school and was shot dead by Abdul Khaliq Hazara during a graduation ceremony. Abdul Khaliq was immediately apprehended, tortured, and then executed by quartering along with most of his relatives including his father and uncle.

According to Hafizullah Emadi, "The government arrested Abdul Khaliq, his family, and friends, and used this opportunity to arrest other potential rivals and execute them on charges of plotting the assassination of King Nadir." His remains were buried in Kabul on Nader Khan Hill (Maranjan Hill). Muhammad Iqbal wrote an elegy for him, which ends in the following words:

سرشکِ دیدۂ نادر به داغِ لاله فشان

چنان که آتشِ او را دگر فرونه نشان! ("The tears from Nader’s eye scatter upon the scar of the tulip,

So much so that his fire can never be extinguished again!" in English)

== Titles, styles and symbols ==
Styles of Mohammed Nadir Shah of Afghanistan
- Reference style: His Majesty
- Spoken style: Your Majesty

During his reign, His Majesty Mohammed Nadir Shah, King of Afghanistan.

=== Royal flag ===
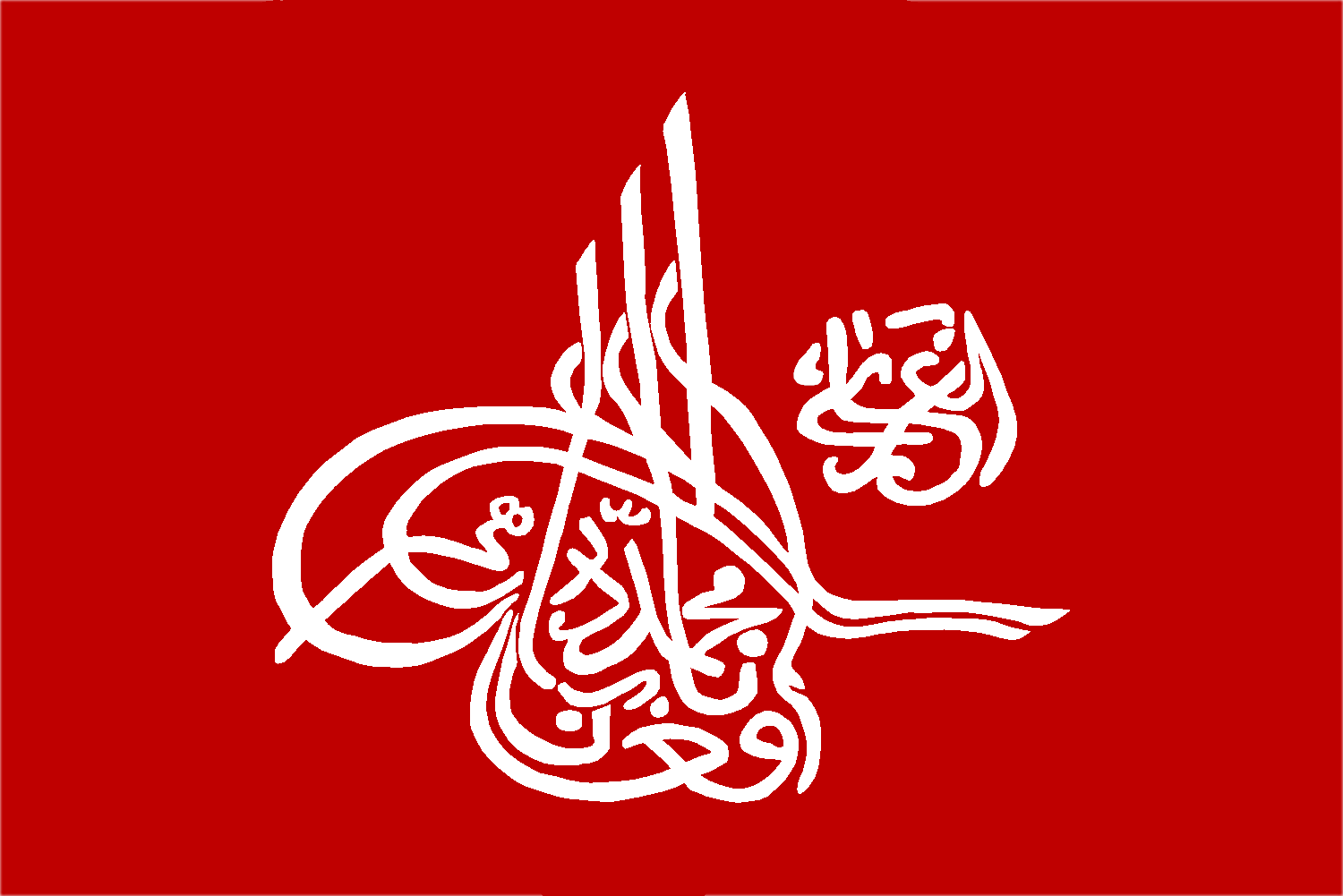
Mohammad Nadir Shah also had his own royal flag:

== References and footnotes ==
Mohammad Nadir Shah Barakzai dynasty Born: 10 April 1880 Died: 8 November 1933
Regnal titles
| Preceded by Habibullāh Kalakāni as King and Emir of Afghanistan | King of Afghanistan; 15 October 1929 – 8 November 1933 | Succeeded by Mohammad Zahir Shah |
