= Arg, Kabul =

Presidential palace of Afghanistan

Coordinates: 34°31′25″N 69°10′44″E

Arg
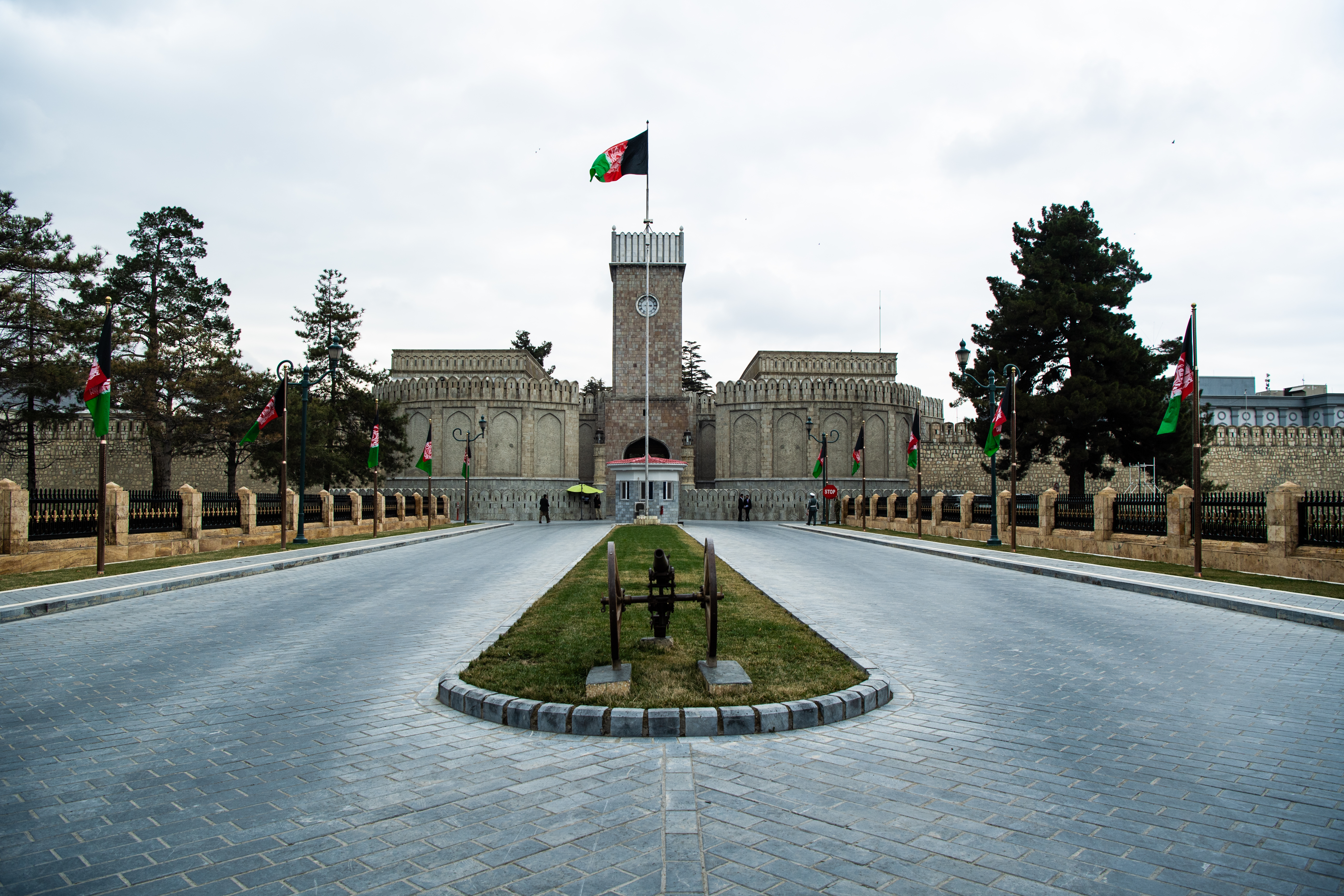
- Front of the palace in 2020, with the flag of the Islamic Republic hoisted
- Interactive map of the Arg area

General information
- Architectural style: Afghan
- Location: Kabul, Afghanistan
- Current tenants: Cabinet of Afghanistan
- Construction started: 1880

Technical details
- Size: Approximately 34 ha (83 acres)

Website
- Official website

The Arg (Note: Pashto: ارگ, romanized: Arg [äɾg]; Dari: ارگ, romanized: Arg [äɾg]) is the presidential palace of Afghanistan, located in Kabul. Since the 2021 abolition of the Afghan presidency by the Taliban, it has served as the meeting place of the Cabinet of Afghanistan. The palace sits on a 34-hectare (83-acre) site in District 2, between Deh Afghanan and the affluent neighbourhood of Wazir Akbar Khan; it has historically been used by many Afghan heads of state, from Abdur Rahman Khan (who laid its foundation) to Ashraf Ghani.

It was built after the destruction of the Bala Hissar in 1880.

== History ==
The foundation of the Arg was laid by Emir Abdur Rahman Khan in 1880 after assuming the throne. It was designed as a castle with a water-filled moat around it. Abdur Rahman Khan named it Arg-e-Shahi (Citadel of the King) and included, among other buildings, a residence for his family, an Afghan Army barracks, and the national treasury. Previously, the Bala Hissar served as the citadel or the headquarters of the emirs until it was destroyed by the Frontier Force Regiment during the Second Anglo-Afghan War (1878–80).

The Arg has served as the royal and presidential palace for all of the kings and presidents of Afghanistan. Hafizullah Amin also used Tajbeg Palace as the residence for his family. It has undergone modifications and revitalization under the different rulers. During the 1978 Saur Revolution, Mohammad Daoud Khan and his family were assassinated by members of the People's Democratic Party of Afghanistan (PDPA) inside the Gulkhana Palace of the Arg. On 15 August 2021, following the 2021 Taliban offensive and the near seizure of the capital, the Taliban occupied the Arg after President Ashraf Ghani fled the country, purportedly for peace and to avoid bloodshed. The Taliban has since been using the Arg to hold meetings of the Cabinet of Afghanistan, except those chaired by the Supreme Leader, which are held in Kandahar.

== Construction ==
The Arg (up to 15 August 2021) consisted of the following:

- The Gul Khana, which served as the offices for President Ashraf Ghani and the President's Protocol Office;
- The Offices of the President's Chief of Staff;
- The National Security Advisor's building; and the Offices of the Spokesperson to the President.
- Offices for the Afghan National Security Forces (ANSF).
- Building for the Administrative Office of the President.
- Various buildings for receiving delegations or hosting large meetings.

== Gallery ==
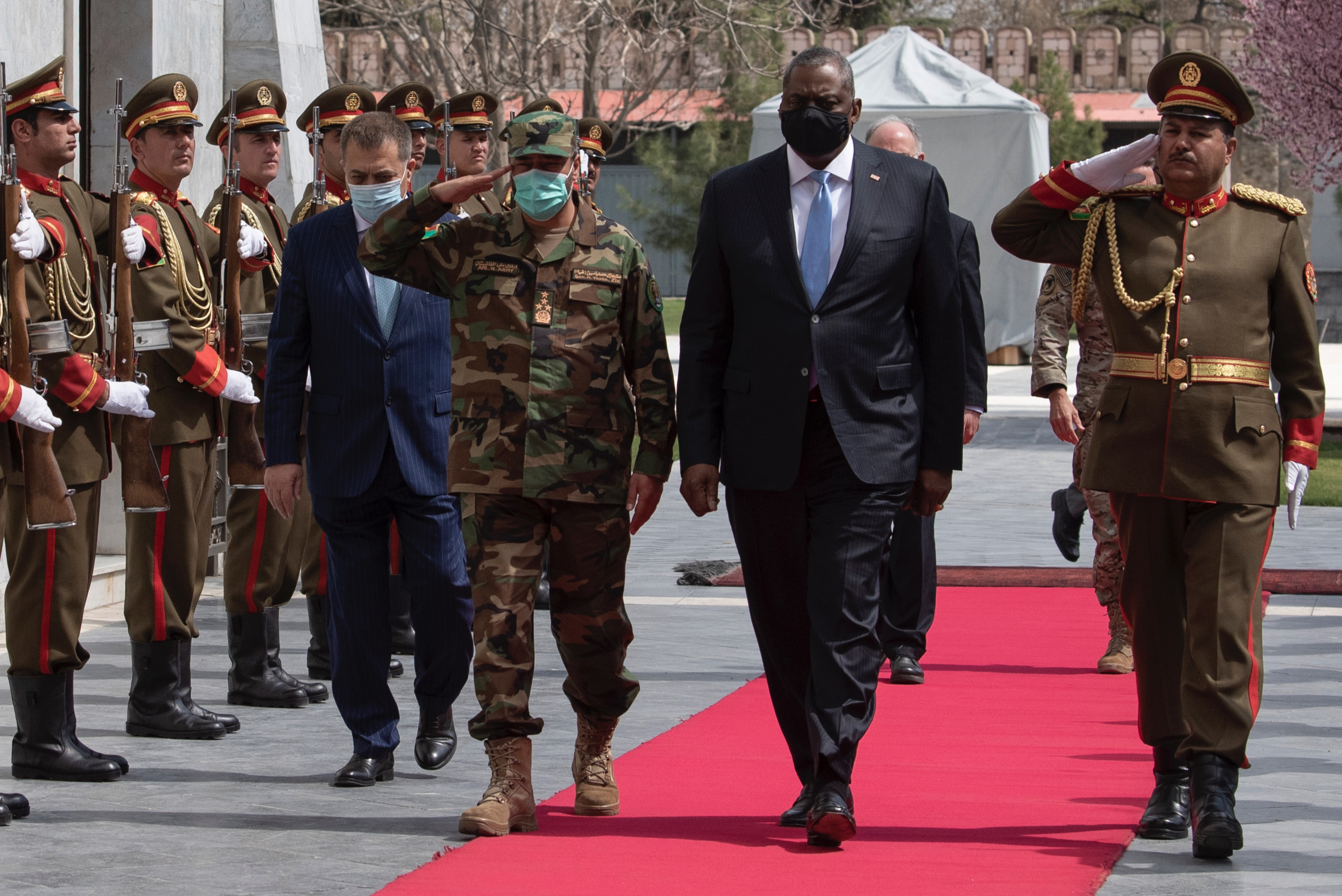
United States Defense Secretary Lloyd Austin at the palace on March 21, 2021

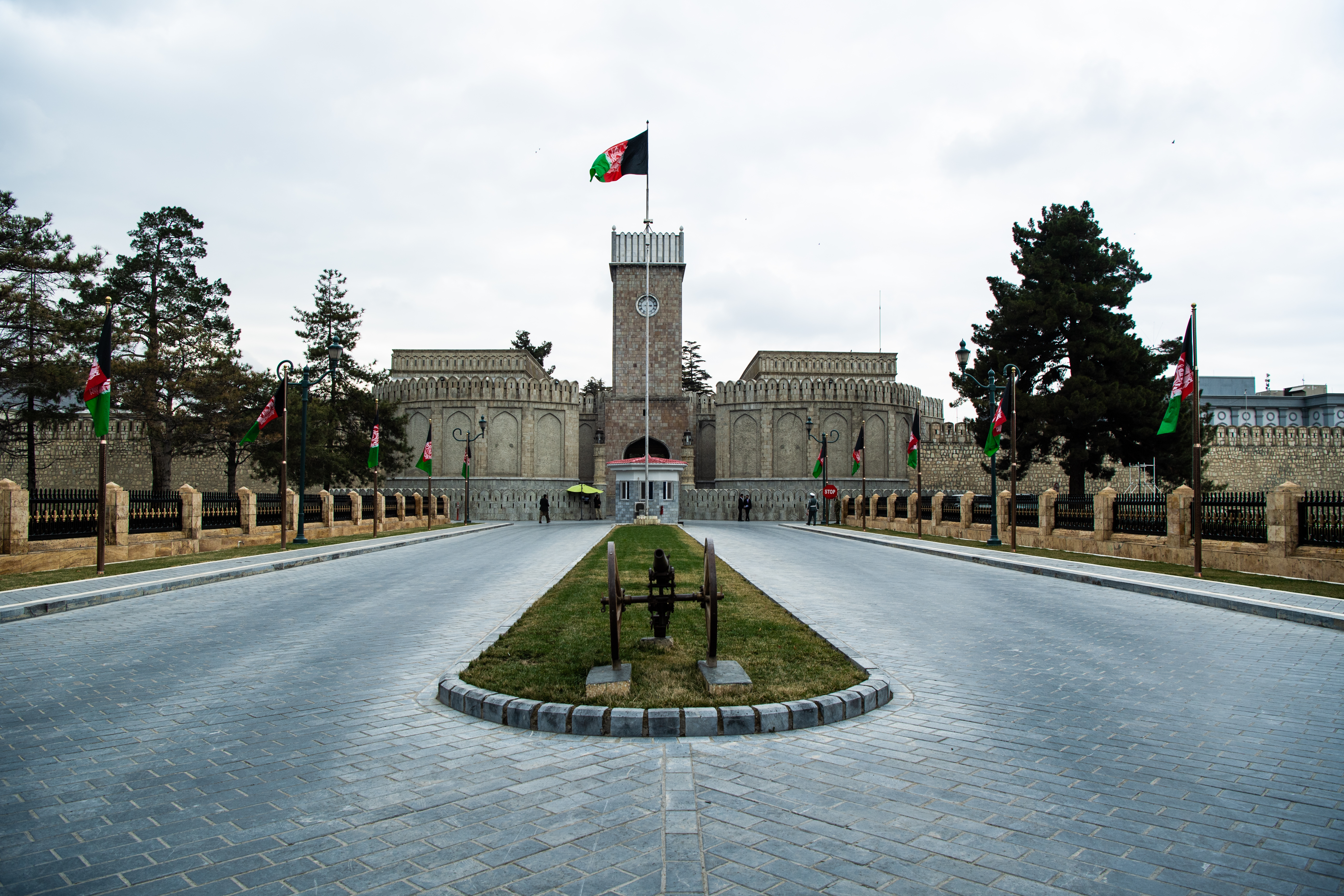
Front of the palace in 2020

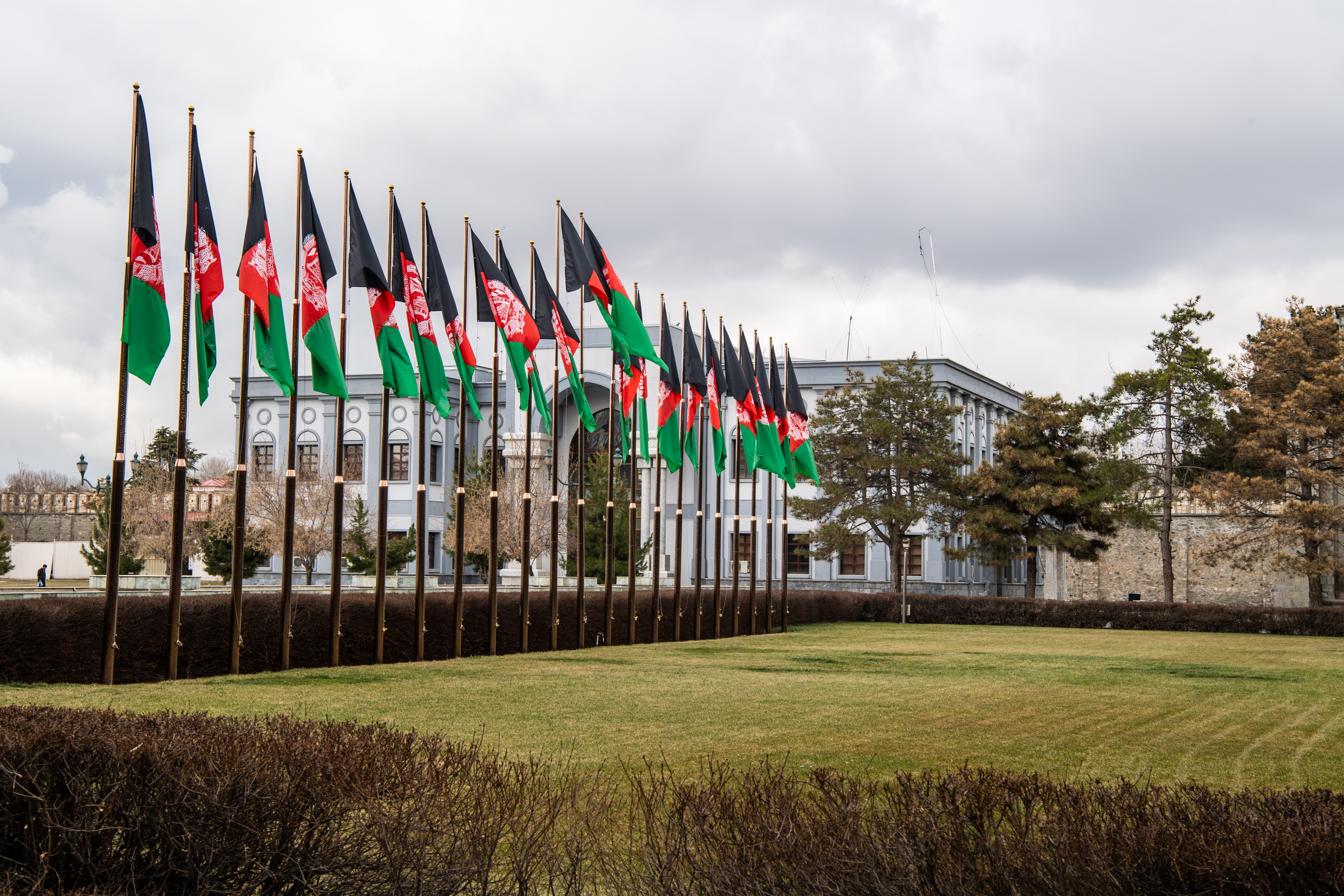
The entrance on February 29, 2020

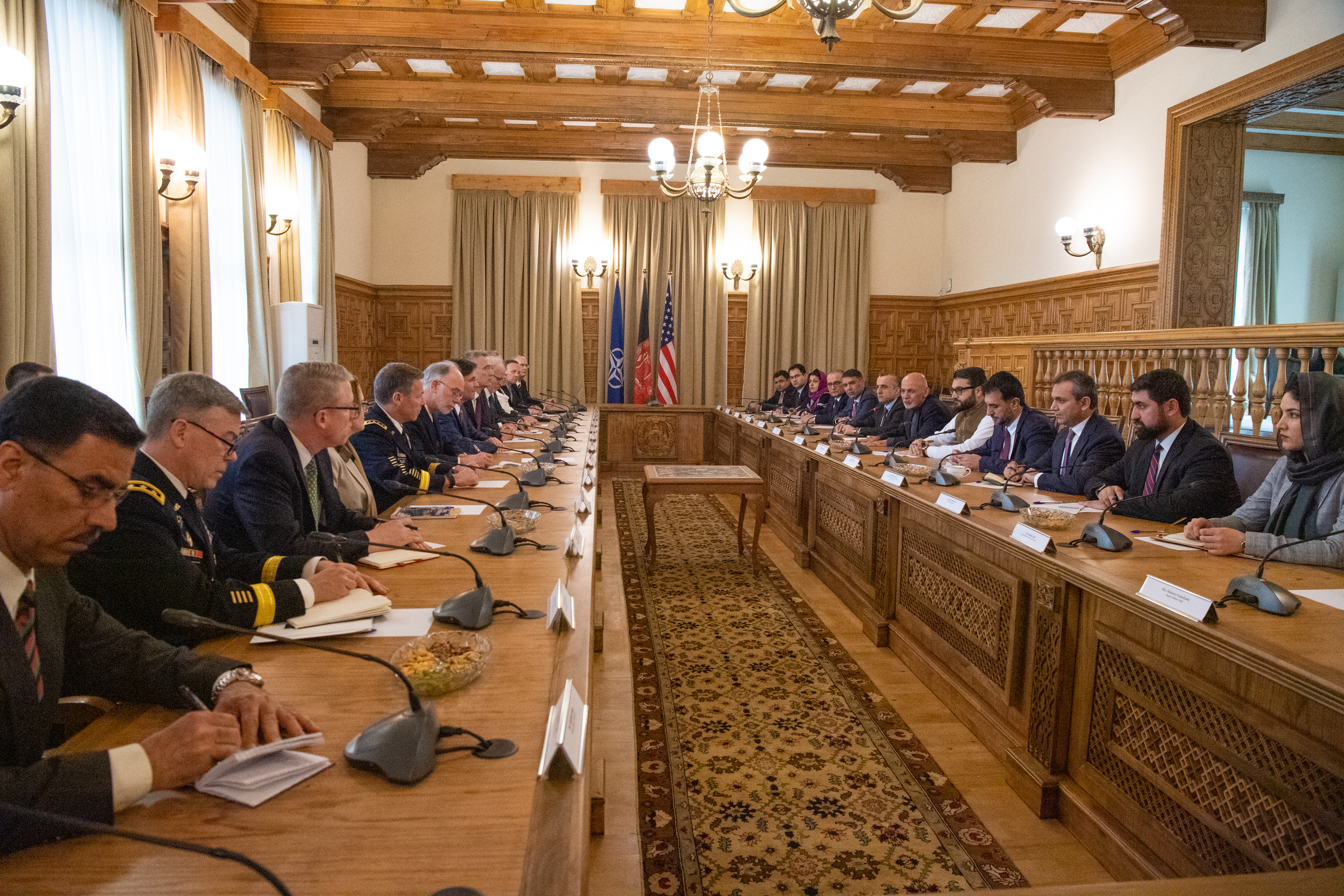
NATO and Afghan officials in 2020

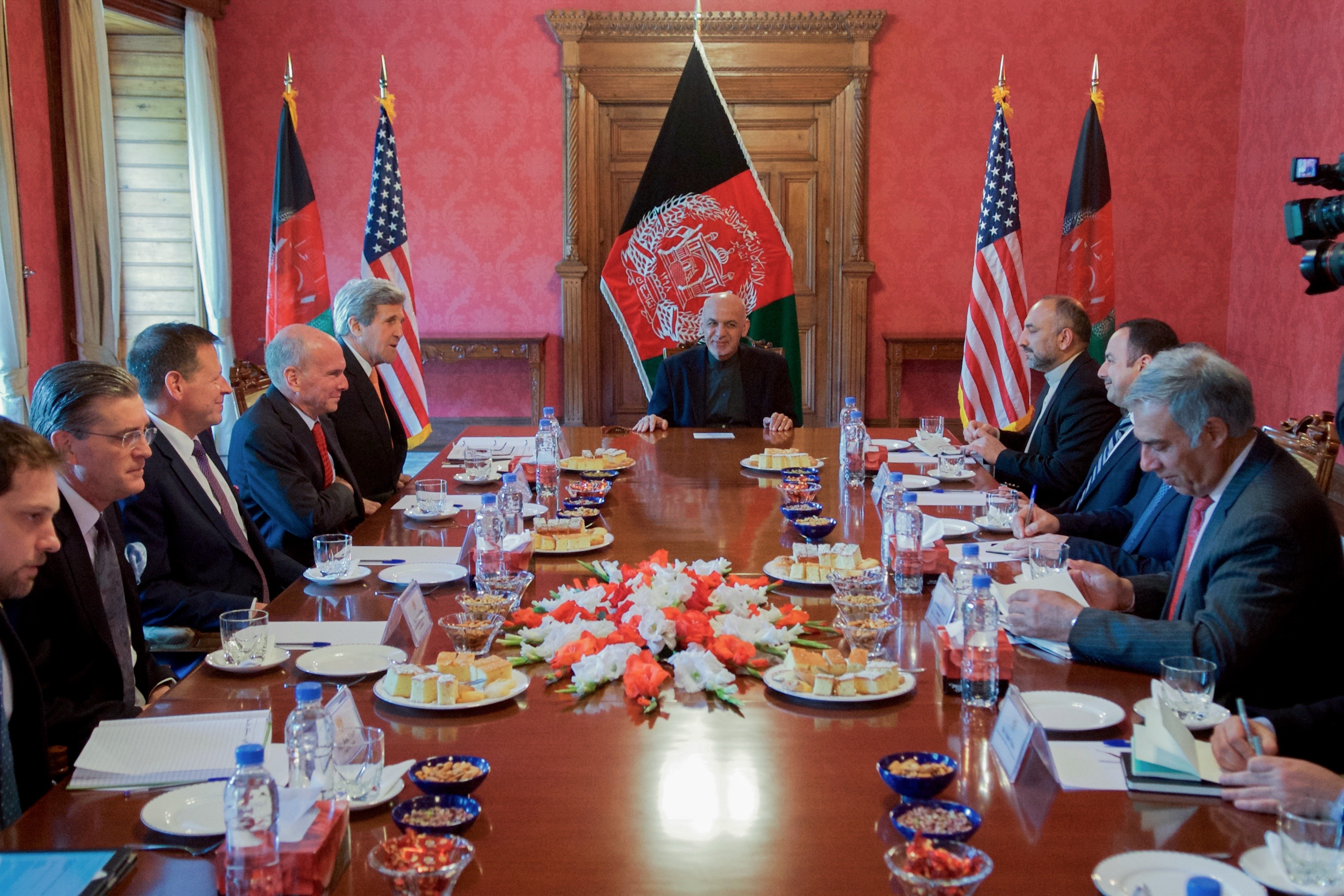
Afghan President Ashraf Ghani with John Kerry

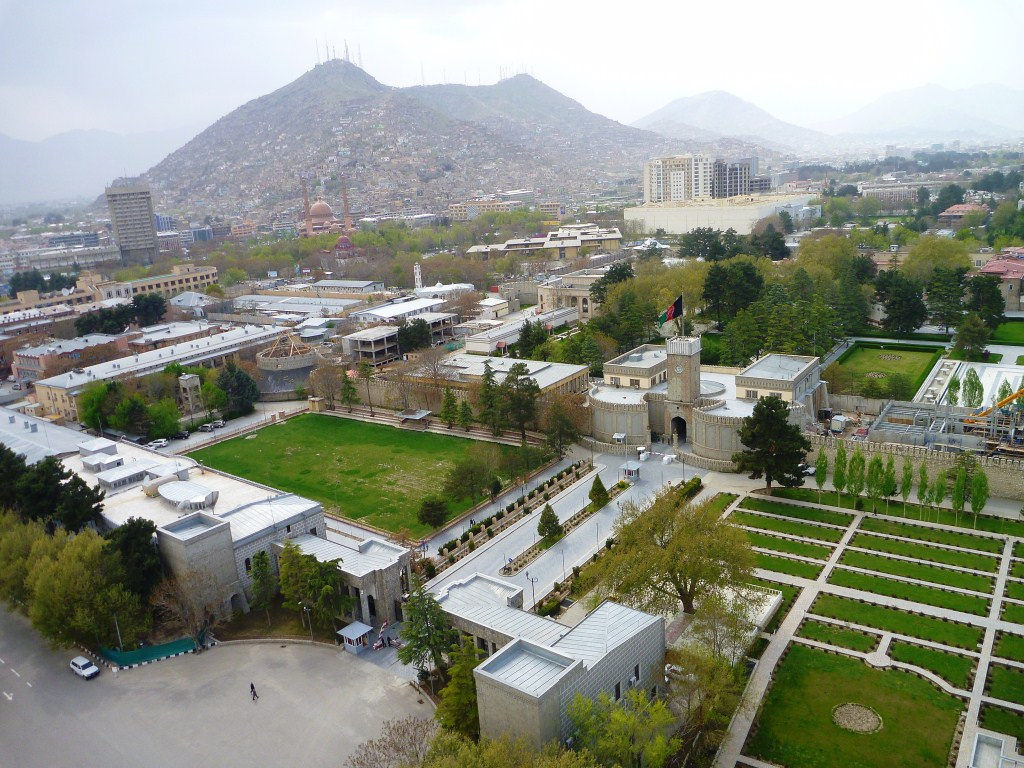
Overview of the Arg palace and several other palaces and gardens within the complex

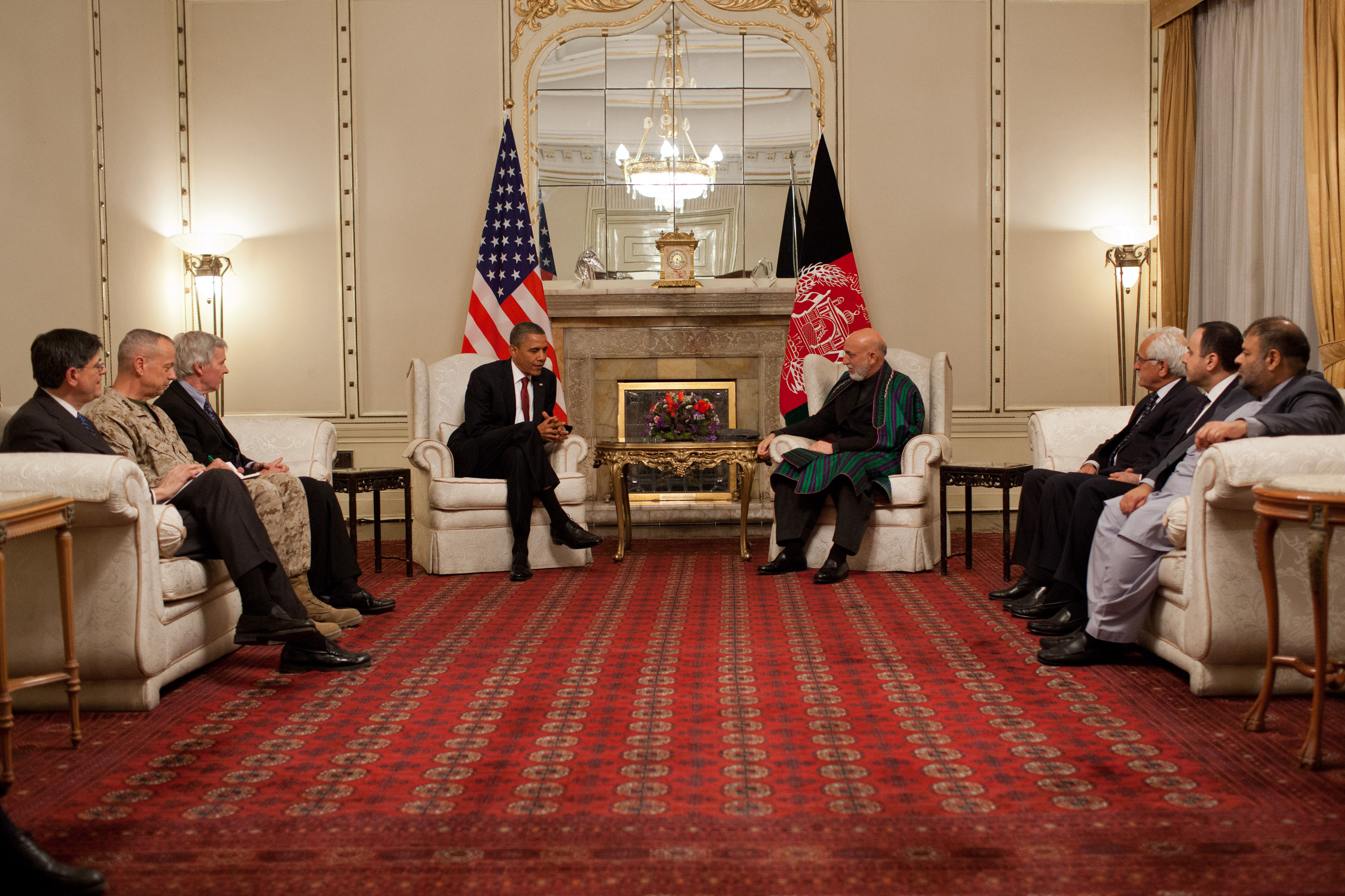
U.S. President Barack Obama and Afghan President Hamid Karzai during the May 2012 signing of the U.S.–Afghanistan Strategic Partnership Agreement

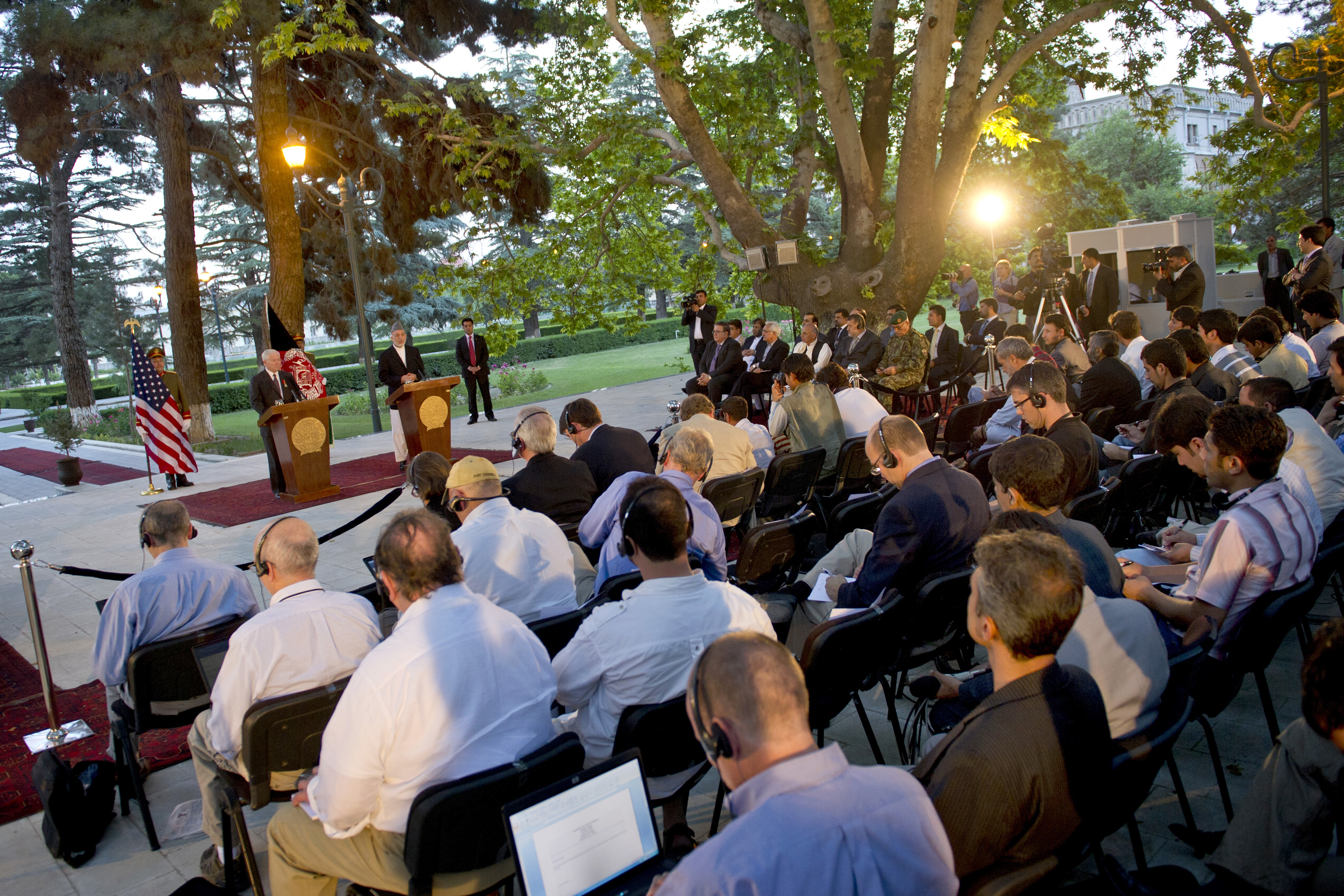
U.S. Defense Secretary Robert M. Gates and Karzai addressing international media in 2011

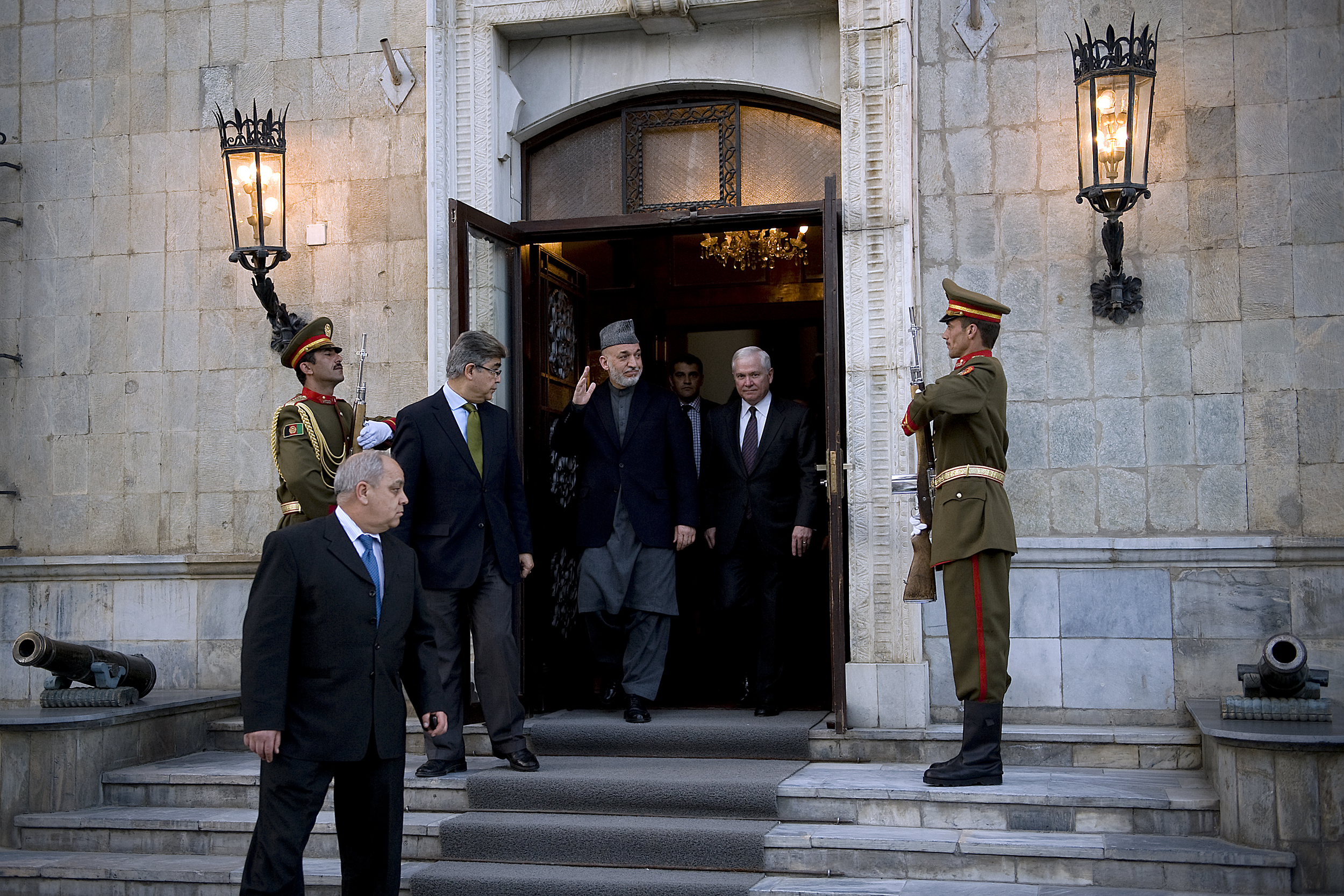
Karzai and Robert Gates in 2010

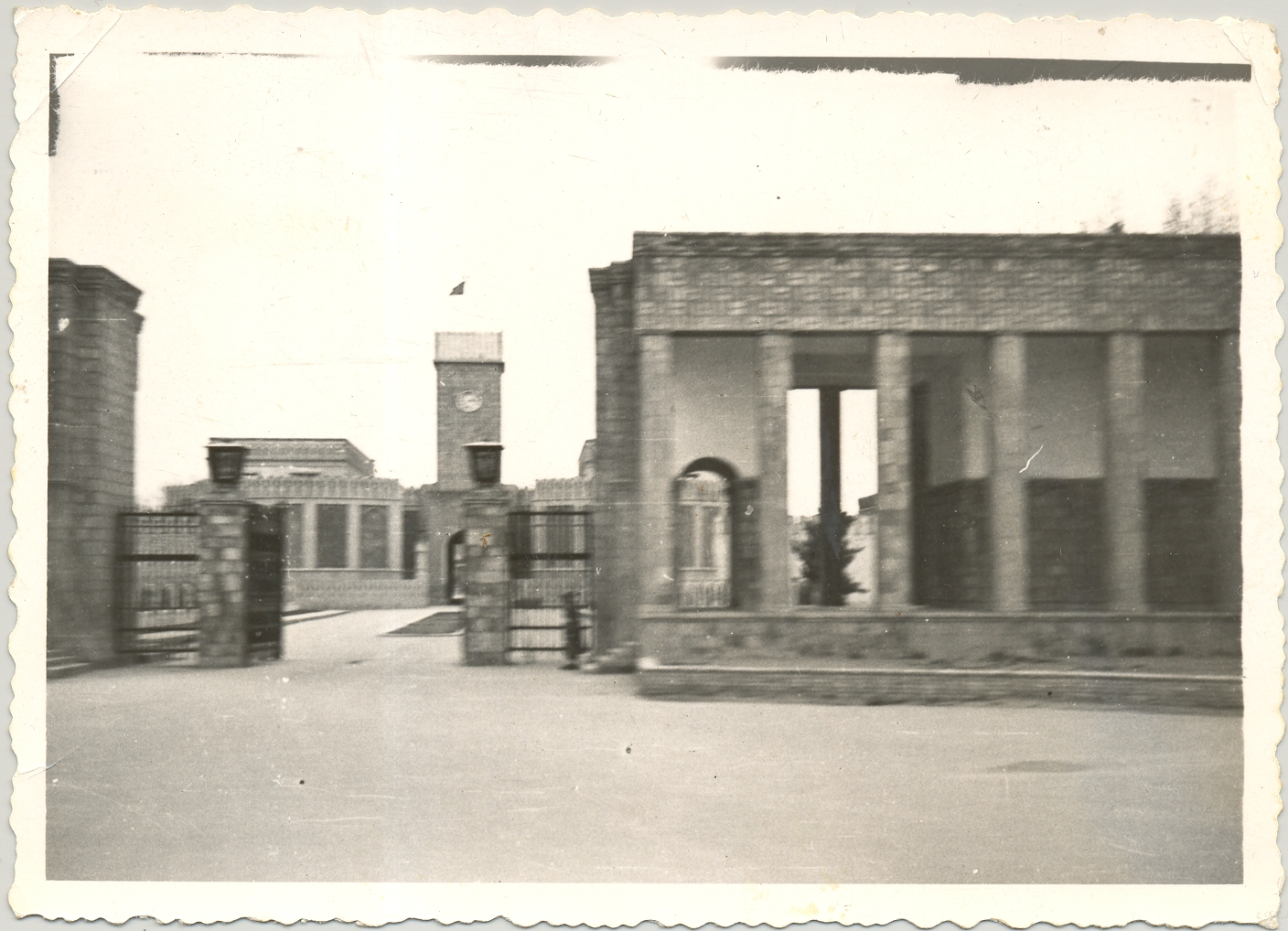
The Arg entrance in 1965

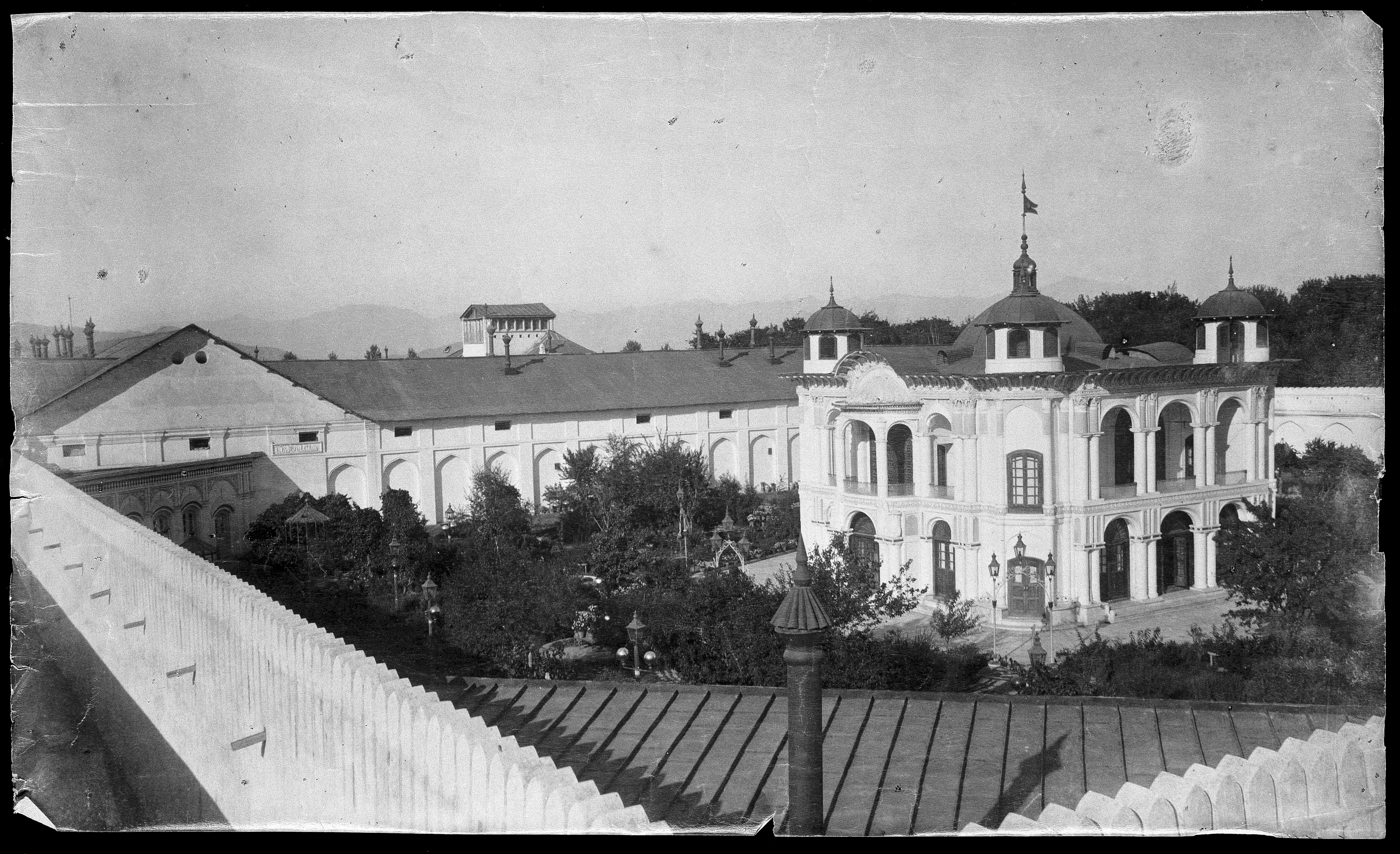
The palace when first built in the 1890s, during the reign of Amir Abdur Rahman Khan

== See also ==
Other palaces in Kabul:

- Bagh-e Bala, a former royal palace in Kabul
- Bala Hissar, an ancient fortress located in the south of the old city of Kabul
- Darul Aman, former royal palace
- Tajbeg Palace, former royal palace
