= Ghulam Muhammad Ghobar =

Afghan politician, activist (1897–1978)

Mir Ghulam Muhammad Ghubar میرغلام‌محمد غبار
- Born: 1897; Kabul, Emirate of Afghanistan
- Died: 1978 (aged 80–81); Kabul, Democratic Republic of Afghanistan
- Occupations: Writer, poet, journalist, politician
- Political party: Social Democratic Party of Afghanistan

Mir Ghulam Muhammad Ghubar (Dari: میرغلام‌محمد غبار; 1897 – February 5, 1978) was a social democratic politician, writer, activist, prominent historian, journalist, and a poet from Afghanistan. He is the author of a number of books, including Afghanistan in the Course of History, and Tareekh-e Ahmad Shah Baba (1943), which is about Ahmad Shah Durrani, the 18th century founder of the Durrani Empire.

== Early life ==
Ghubar was born in or about 1897 in the city of Kabul. He spent some of his time in the cities of Qandahar and Farah, in the south of the country where he wrote several of his books. His native language was Persian.

== Activism ==
Ghobar began his political engagement at a young age, coming under the influence of constitutionalists and reformers like Mahmud Tarzi, Abdul Hadi Dawi and Abdul Rahman Ludin by joining the constitutionalist movement known as Jawanan Afghan (Young Afghans) during Emir Habibullah Khan's rule. He advocated for conditional governance in Afghanistan, and throughout this endeavor, he faced two arrests and was exiled to remote areas on one occasion. Despite these challenges, Ghobar remained steadfast in his fight and also authored numerous scholarly works on Afghanistan's literature and history. In this regard, he is recognized as one of Afghanistan's notable historians and champions of freedom.

== Death ==
He died on 16 December 1977 in Berlin. After his funeral, his body was transferred to Afghanistan and buried in Shahada Salehin Cemetery.
