= Poetry of Afghanistan =

Javid Intezar

Poetry of the modern-day region called Afghanistan has ancient roots, mostly written in Dari and Pashto. Afghan poetry relates to the culture of Afghanistan and is an element of Afghan literature.

== History ==
The region called Afghanistan nowadays was noted for its poetic language even before the Islamic conquest of Afghanistan in the 7th through 11th centuries. The Pata Khazana, if authentic, contains Pashto poetry written as far back as the 8th Century. Some of the famous poets who were born or lived in the region of present-day Afghanistan include Rumi, perhaps the most famous Afghan poet; Khushal Khan Khattak, considered the father of Afghan literature; Rahman Baba, Ahmad Shah Durrani, Timur Shah Durrani, Shuja Shah Durrani, Ghulam Muhammad Tarzi, Ghulam Habib Nawabi, Massoud Nawabi, Homaira Nakhat Dastgirzada, and many others.

The nation also has a number of female poets, such as Rabia Balkhi, 17th century Nazo Tokhi, and others.

== Styles ==
Afghan poetry includes a form of poetry called a landay, a folk couplet with 22 syllables (nine syllables in the first line and 13 in the second). Traditionally, landays are sung aloud, written by women, and may or may not rhyme. Their themes range from more traditional tropes to, more recently, an expression of forbidden feelings, or a rejection of authority and rigid religion. This form of poetry is still practiced in Afghanistan, largely covertly by women, as the Taliban has forbidden music.

== See also ==
- Pashto literature and poetry
- Afghan literature
- Culture of Afghanistan
