= Afghan literature =

Afghan literature or literature of Afghanistan refers to the literature produced in modern-day Afghanistan. Influenced by Central and South Asian literature, it is predominantly written in the two official languages of Afghanistan: Dari and Pashto. Some regional languages such as Uzbek, Turkmen, Balochi, and Pashayi also appear in Afghan literature. While Afghanistan is a multilingual country, the two official languages are generally used for oral compositions and written texts by Afghan writers and in the Afghan curriculum. Afghan literature is highly influenced by Persian and Arabic literature in addition to that of Central and South Asia.

Afghan literature dates back to ancient Afghanistan, where the earliest works of literature were orally transmitted. The oldest extant records of written Afghan literature are believed to be using a derivative of the Nabataean variation of the Aramaic alphabet, dating to the 5th and 6th centuries. However, it primarily originated in the early Islamic centuries.

Archaeological research conducted since 1922 has shown fine art featuring pre-Islamic scripts, demonstrating Afghanistan's rich linguistic legacy of pre-Islamic scripts. Scripts used include Sharada, Kharosthi, Greek, and Brāhmī, which were replaced with the Arabic script following the Islamic conquest of Afghanistan. The Bactrian language, spoken in Bactria (present-day Afghanistan) between 300 BC – 1000 AD and the official language of the region for several hundred years, used an alphabet based on the Greek alphabet.

== Medieval period literature ==
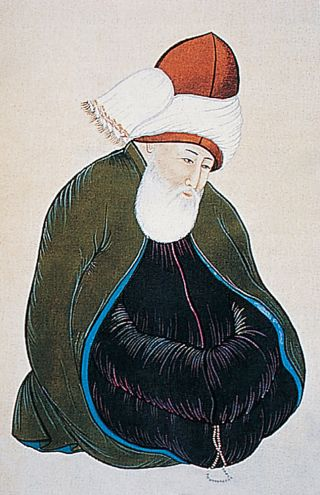
A historical representation of Rumi, author unknown

In the medieval period, dynasties and empires such as the Samanid Empire, the Ghaznavids, the Timurids, and the Mughal Empire, were highly influenced by Persian literature, and in exchange, often provided patronage to creators of literature. They encouraged and supported writers such as Rumi, Jami, Rudaki, Ferdowsi, and Khwaja Abdullah Ansari, who wrote in Persian. Dari (a variety of Persian), Pashto, Arabic, and Turkic languages were also extensively used in the medieval period.

While rulers might have hundreds of poets in their courts, ordinary people also had some access to poetry - travelling poets and minstrels, known as sazinda or mutrib, would travel from village to village to entertain.

The epic poem, Shahnameh, by Firdawsi is regarded as one of the most important works in Afghanistan, while Rumi, who was born in present-day Afghanistan, is regarded as one of the greatest poets in Afghan and Persian literature. The first known woman to write poetry in Persian, Rabia Balkhi, was from what is now Afghanistan, during the 10th century. She became a semi-legendary figure and now has schools, roads and hospitals in Afghanistan and other countries named after her.

== Colonial literature ==
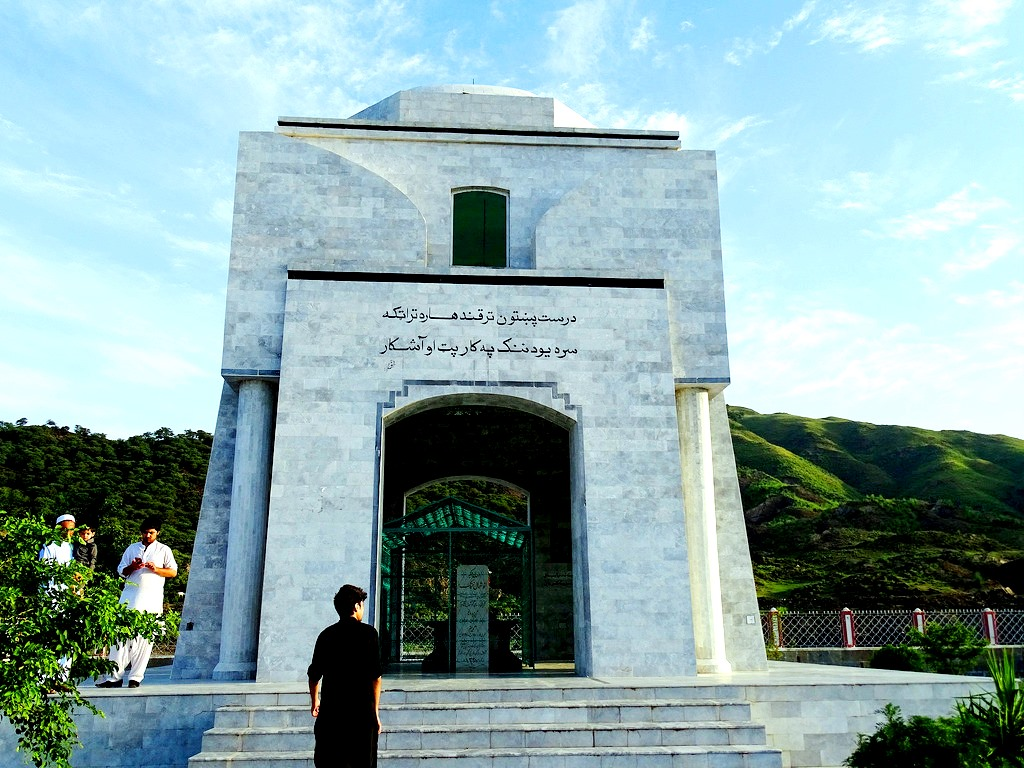
The tomb of Khushal Khattak, considered Afghanistan's national poet, in present-day Pakistan

Because of the large amount of immigration to other countries in the 16th to 18th centuries, the center of early Afghan literature has often been considered to be outside of the country. During this time, many literary figures originated in the present-day Afghanistan, but after the partition between the Mughal empire and Safavid dynasty, several poets, including Khushal Khattak, considered the national poet of Afghanistan, moved to literary centres outside of the country. He wrote extensively about life in Afghanistan and the struggles of the Afghan people. By the late 19th century, Pakhtuns sung poetry with music, in the same style as ghazals, a classical Urdu genre.

In 1886, a French author James Darmesteter wrote about the historical importance of Afghanistan's literature and the role of poets.

Context

if we want to know what an Afghan is, let us put all books aside and receive his own unconscious confession from the lips of his favorite poets.

— Widmark, Anders. The View from Within: An Introduction to New Afghan Literature, Words Without Borders

== Modern literature ==
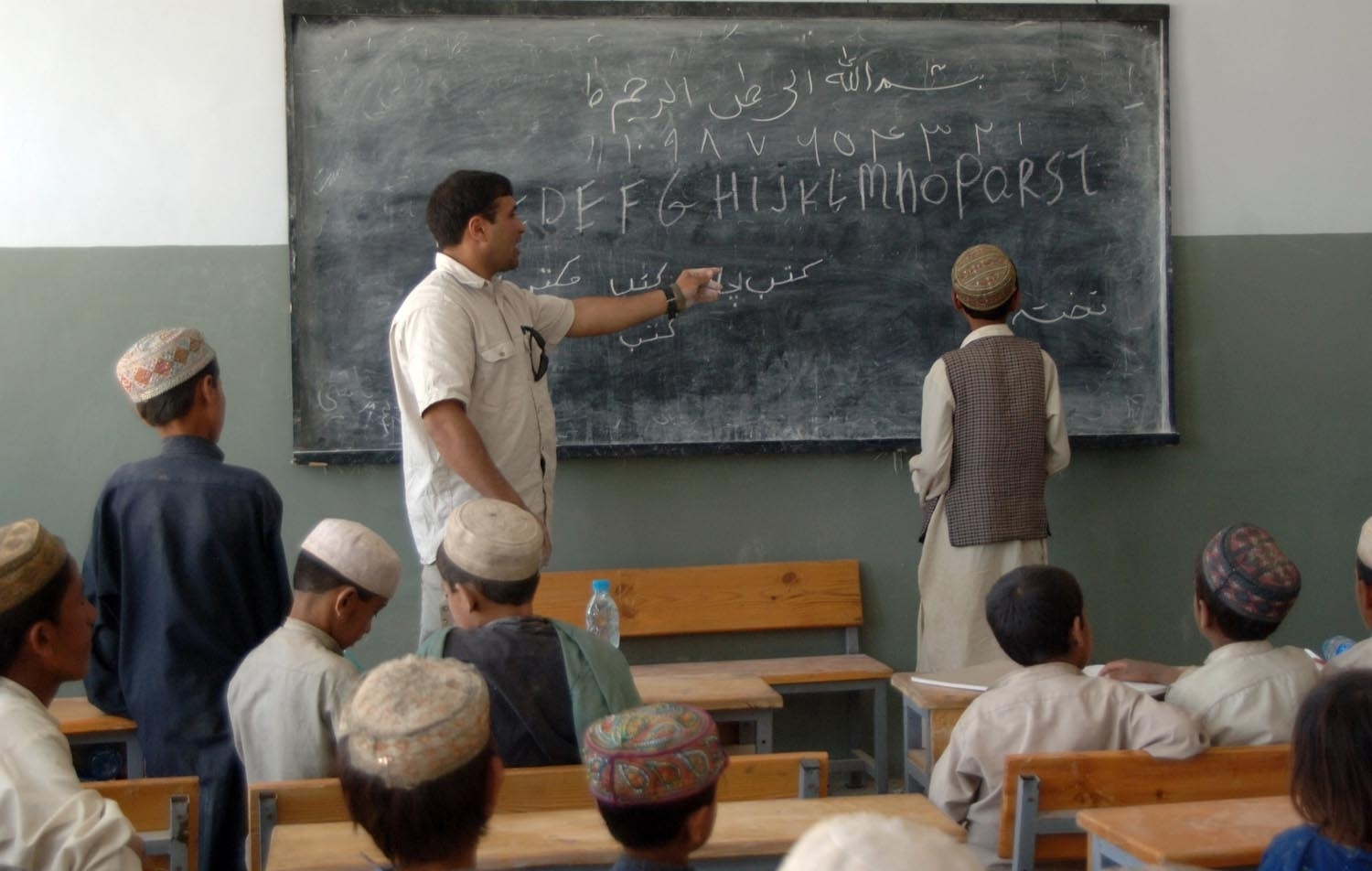
Typical classroom in rural areas of Afghanistan

Afghanistan's contemporary literature has roots in its heritage of oral composition and traditionally written texts. Pashto and Dari, the two official languages of Afghanistan, are used by the majority of the natives of Afghanistan and have about sixty million speakers between them, so a major part of Afghanistan's comptempory literature is in the two languages. In the 20th century, the capital city Kabul became the center of publishing and Afghan literature. Mahmud Tarzi was the editor of Seraj al Akhbar, Kabul's first literary newspaper circulated from 1911 to 1919. He is often known for his contribution for the development of the modern literary environment, as Tarzi was actively involved in promoting Pashto as a national language and provided information and news through his Persian-language newspaper Seraj al Akhbar. During that period, Seraj ul Akhbar played a significant role in modernising Afghan society through its articles. Tarzi also translated several books of foreign literature such as Jules Verne from Ottoman Turkish.

Over the past few decades, Afghanistan has produced several significant literary figures including Khalilullah Khalili. Khalili is referred to as the "Renaissance man" for his contribution to modern literature. His most famous poetry collection, translated as The House of Waiting, is about the struggles of Afghanistan and her people. Sher Zaman Taizi's book of Pashtun poems, titled The Field (1988), is also considered to have played a significant role in literature.

In the modern era, Afghan poets and short story writers are actively engaged in writing poetry and respond to political events with an unusual sense of immediacy. For example, only a month after the destruction of the Buddhas of Bamiyan, “The Idol’s Dust” by Zalmay Babakohi was written about it.

== The rise of poetry ==
Afghan poetry and culture has a long history dating back to the rise of Sufism. Poetry was written in various shared languages such as Persian, Dari, Pashto, and very few in Urdu. Poetry in foreign languages such as English and Turkic also has a strong influence on Afghan poetry.

Afghan poetry reflects diverse spiritual traditions within the country. In particular, many Afghan poets have been inspired by mystical and Sufism experiences. Afghan poetry is the oldest form of literature in Afghanistan and has a rich written and oral tradition. The great poet Rumi was born in present-day Afghanistan poet, who wrote mostly in Dari throughout his life. Other poets wrote in Dari, Pashto and Arabic.

Modern Afghan women usually write in the traditional Afghan poetry form, consisting of two lines of rhyme, called landay.

== Proverbs ==
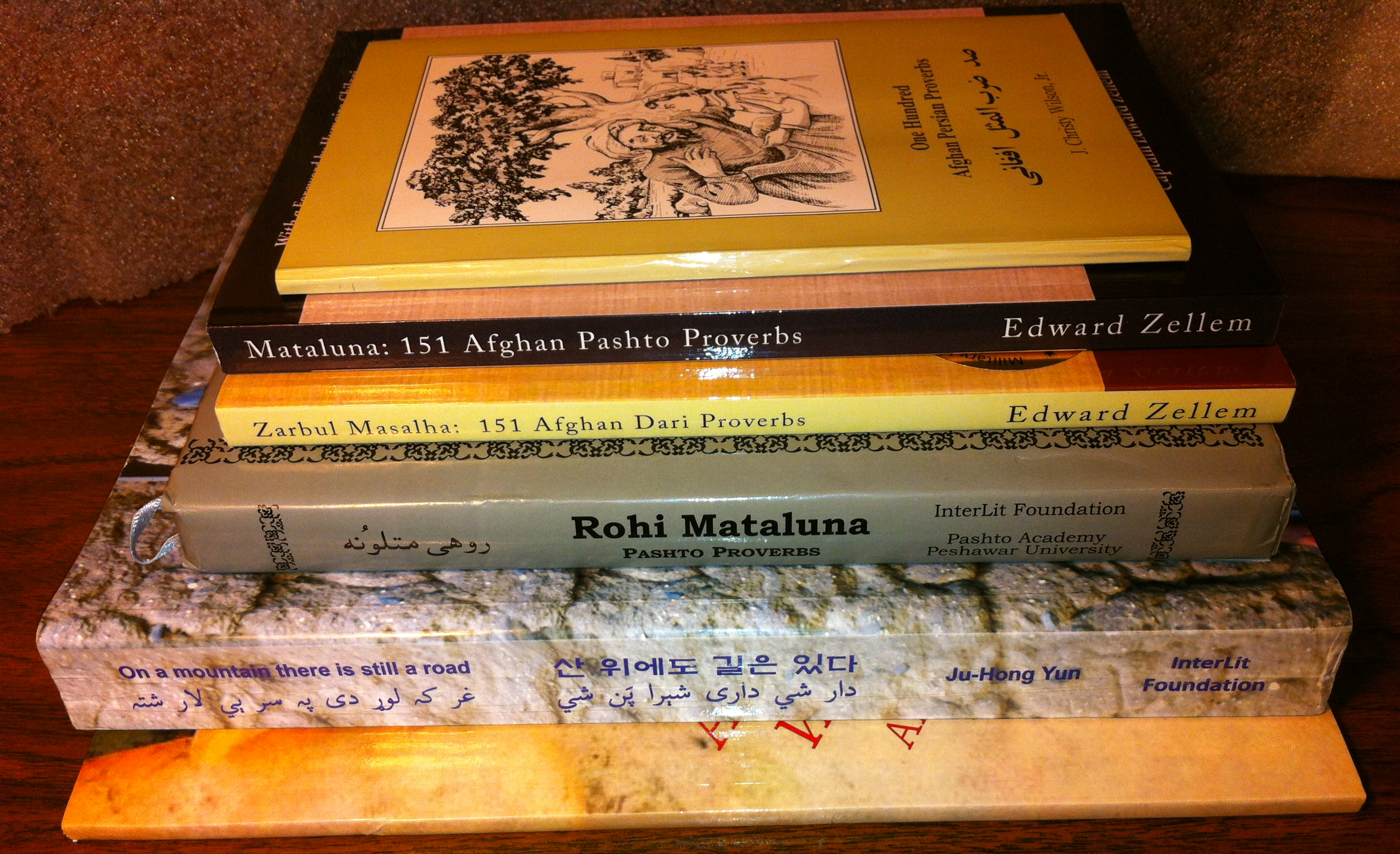
A collection of books containing Afghan proverbs.

Afghan proverbs are generally simple, concrete, and traditional. They usually express a perceived truth based on common sense or experience. Some proverbs are based on events that occurred in real life, or imagination facts that temporarily create objects, peoples and ideas without any immediate input of the senses.

Afghan proverbs primarily exist in the two officially recognised languages, Dari and Pashto. Unrecognised or anonymous proverbs exist in more than two languages because people borrow them from foreign languages or regional languages which are similar to Afghan languages.
