= Young Afghans =

Political movement in Afghanistan

The Young Afghans (Note: Pashto: د افغانستان ځوانان, romanized: Də Afğānistān Źwānān [d̪ə ʔäʊ.ɣɑ.nis.t̪ɑn/ʔäp.ɣɑ.nis.t̪ɑn d͡zwɑ.nɑn]; Persian: جوانان افغانستان, romanized: Jawānān-i Afghānistān [d͡ʒä.wɑː.nɑ́ː.nɪ ʔäv.ɣɑː.nɪs.t̪ʰɑ́ːn/ʔäf.ɣɑː.nɪs.t̪ʰɑ́ːn]) were a political constitutionalist movement in Afghanistan that emerged during the reign of Emir Habibullah Khan in the early twentieth century.

== Foundation ==
Mahmud Tarzi being ideologically aligned to Jamal al-Din al-Afghani's anti-British and pan-Islamic agenda, as well as the Young Turks' social and political reforms that support legislative transformation and technological modernization. Tarzi believed that the "backwardness" in Afghanistan had to be combatted by establishing tanzimat reforms, which led him to create the 'Young Afghans' movement in Kabul alongside a group of like-minded reformers. earning him the title "The Turk", or "Mahmud Beg" among the people of Afghanistan. Mir Sayyid Mohammad Qasim, the Afghan Minister of Justice during the Kingdom of Afghanistan was also a member of the Young Afghans.

== Controversy ==
Emir Habibullah Khan inaugurated Habibia High School, the first European-style high school in Afghanistan, modeled by the Muhammadan Anglo-Oriental College under the influence of the Young Afghans led by Mahmud Tarzi. However, backlash would be soon faced by Nasrullah Khan and his Sunni faction that graduated from Darul Uloom Deoband, opposing the "secularization" of education, and urging to retain traditional Islamic education in madrasas, which was then quickly resolved through negotiations.
