= Ghulam Muhammad Tarzi =

Afghan Sardār of Qandahār (19th century)

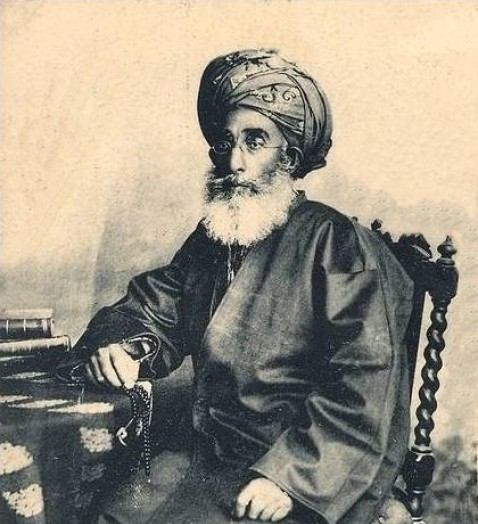

Sardar Ghulam Muhammad Khan Tarzi (Pashto: غلام محمد خان طرزي) (born Kandahar, April 30, 1830 – 1900/1901) son of Sardar Rahim Dil Khan (and grandson of Sardar Payinda Khan Mohammadizi or Sardar Payinda Muhammad Khan) was a ruler of Kandahar. He was a Pashtun soldier, poet, and military leader in Afghanistan. He is often credited with developing the traditional family name 'Tarzi,' which played a critical role in the history of Afghanistan.

== Early life ==
Tarzi's family belonged to the royal sub-tribe known as the Mohammadzai, the most powerful and prominent of the Barakzai Dynasty. A soldier in his youth, he later took up poetry. Soon after, Amir Dost Muhammad integrated him into the community of state princes and learned scholars. Tarzi was related to both Amir Dost Muhammad and his successor, Amir Sher Ali Khan.

== Chief ==
Evidence shows Tarzi as a Chief in southern Afghanistan, most likely holding the majority of the region his father held. A report from the Bombay foreign Secretary to the government of India regarding Tarzi stated:

"Sardar Gholam Mohammad of Kandahar is the eldest son of Sardar Rahimdel. Our scant information indicates that at one time he was a prominent chief but there is no actual evidence that he held an important post in Afghanistan at this time. His cousin, the governor does not have a good opinion of him. As far as we know, he has never rendered a service to the British government and therefore we are in no way indebted to him."

== Sardar ==
Tarzi participated and led his men into battle in the Second Anglo-Afghan War. After the war, he became one of the Sardars (leaders) whom the Amir accused of rebellion. He was expelled from Afghanistan in 1881.

== Poet ==
He moved to Karachi and then to India. There, he returned to writing poetry and toured many major cities in India, where he was welcomed by the anti-monarchs. He took the pen-name "Tarzi" (the stylist/the intellectual) as he wrote religious, mystic and secular poetry in a personal style that became known from Syria to Turkmenistan to India. He tired of India and moved his family to Baghdad, as invited guests of Sheikh Abdul-adar Ghilani. The British did not count him as a supporter and were glad to see him leave. Soon thereafter, the family moved to Istanbul, Turkey, where the Sultan bestowed royal favours and had them stay at a government house with a large monthly allowance. After a long tenure, they moved to Damascus. Tarzi was known for intimate gatherings with city leaders to talk philosophy and ethics.

Later in life Tarzi reestablished contact with Amir Abdur Rahman Khan. Tarzi's name and his works are still well known in countries from Iran to China. He and his son Mahmud Tarzi became valuable academic sources in Western countries in the early 19th century.

== Death ==
On December 8, 1900, he died in Damascus, Syria, where he had come for vacation or on 5 February 1901. His fame and the political instability in Afghanistan 1888-1919 may be the reason for hiding the date. Formal funeral arrangements were made by the Syrian authorities. He was buried in the Hazrat Dahdah cemetery in Damascus, with leaders paying respects from over ten nations/empires.

== Legacy ==
Tarzi is the father of Afghan leader Mahmud Tarzi who served as Ambassador and Foreign Minister of Afghanistan and was also a poet. Ghulam Muhammad Tarzi married 5 times, leaving 11 sons and 6 daughters Tarzi's granddaughter, Soraya Tarzi, became the first Queen consort of Afghanistan and an international women's leader.
