= Seraj al-Akhbar =

Persian newspaper

Sirāj al-Akhbār
- Logo of Seraj al-Akhbar
- Categories: Politics
- Publisher: Mahmud Tarzi
- Founded: 1911
- Final issue: 1919
- Country: Afghanistan
- Based in: Kabul
- Language: Persian

Seraj al-Akhbar (Note: Arabic: سراج الأخبار, romanized: Sirāj al-Akhbār, lit. 'Lamp of the News' [si.raːd͡ʒ‿ul.ax.baːr] ([se̞.ɾɑː.d͡ʒʊ́l äx.bɑ́ːɾ])) was a Persian-language newspaper that circulated in Kabul, Afghanistan from 1911–1919. Published in 1911, the newspaper was founded by Mahmud Tarzi as an attempt at modernization, with the support of Emir Habibullah Khan. It was primarily a political newspaper, purposing to keep the country informed about international affairs, and the current events of the country. Seraj al Akhbar promoted Pan-Islamism, and supported the young Turks coalition in the Ottoman Empire. As the first recognized newspaper in the country, Seraj al Akhbar is regarded as the founding of the Afghan press.

== History ==
=== Founding ===
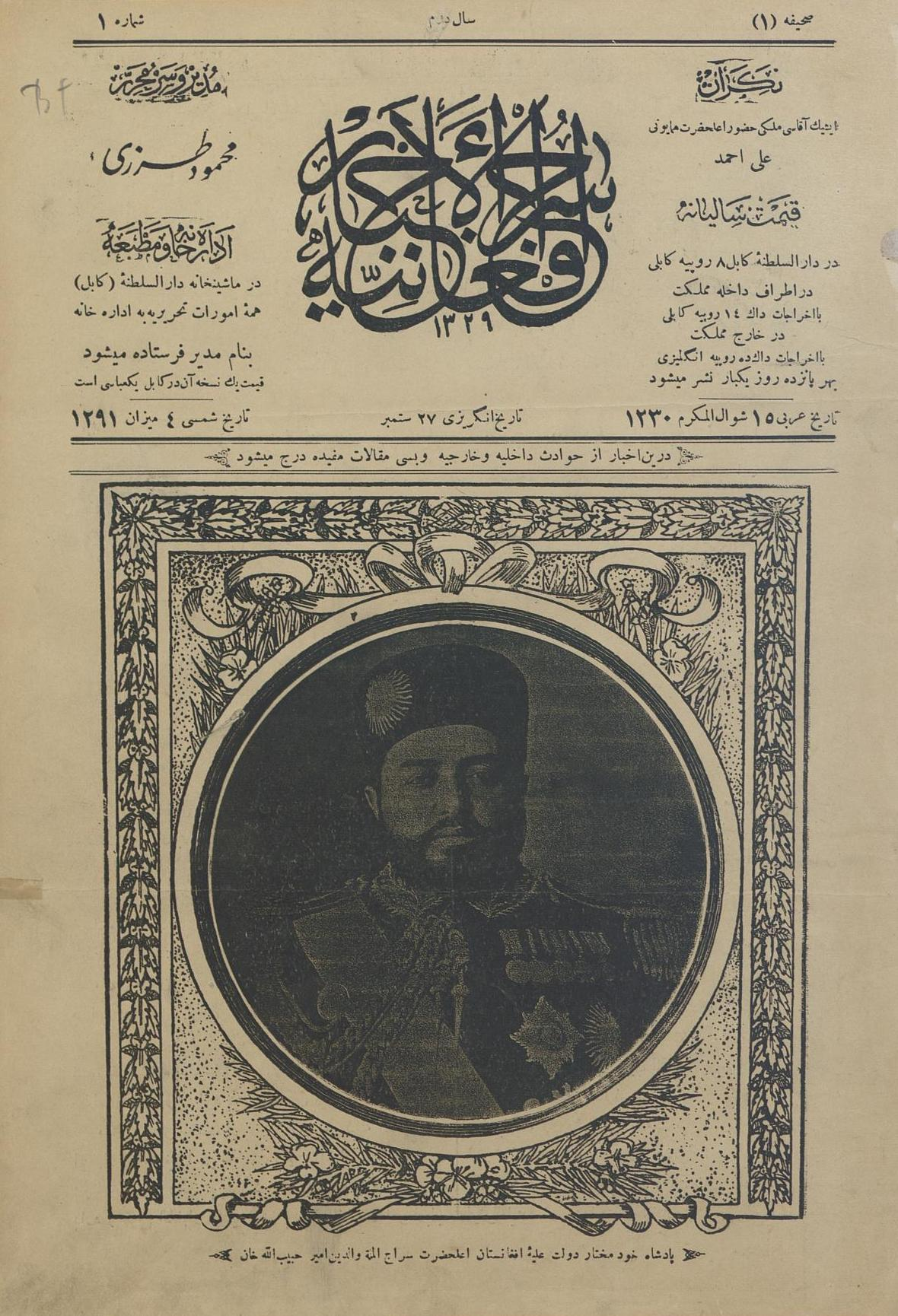
Heading of the Seraj al-Akhbar newspaper, featuring Emir Habibullah Khan, captioned: "Autonomous King of the Sublime State of Afghanistan, His Majesty, Lamp of the Religion and the Religion, Habibullah Khan"

Mahmud Tarzi was born in Ghazni, Afghanistan, on August 23, 1865, the son of Sardar Gholam Mohammad Tarzi, who was leader of the Mohamadzai royal house, and a popular poet. When the family was condemned to exile in 1881, following the accession of Emir Abdur Rahman Khan, they lived in Karachi, Sindh for four years, before moving to Syria. Tarzi travelled frequently during his youth, with trips to Mecca and Paris. One of his earlier works: Account of a Journey, recounts these travels, which did much to imbue the young Mahmud Tarzi with ideas of modernism and westernization. His friendship with political activist and Islamic ideologist Jamal ad Din al Afghani was also responsible for his appeal to Pan-Islamism. When Emir Abdur Rahman died, Habibullah Khan ascended the throne and recalled Tarzi from exile. In 1905, Tarzi's two daughters married both the king Habibullah and the prince and future king Amanullah Khan. He was given a post in the government, and shortly after was encouraged to start a newspaper. Seraj al Akhbar was first published in 1911 and had a circulation of 1600 copies. It immediately became a voice of modernization in the country, attracting pro-western students, who formed the young Afghan coalition. Seraj al Akhbar made significant efforts in keeping the country informed of political affairs of the world, with a view of supporting the progressive ideologies formed by the young Turks coalition. Despite its modernizing ideals, the newspaper was also a vehicle of propaganda by the monarchy and Pan-Islamic factions of the country. It distanced itself from the affairs of the British Empire and the Russian Revolution, while publishing tracts from Turkish newspapers ridiculing the enemies of the Ottoman Empire.

=== Afghanistan: 1911 – 1919 ===
In 1911, the British Empire controlled the foreign policy of Afghanistan. Only a few decades ago, the Second Anglo-Afghan War had resulted in the defeat of Afghan forces under Emir Sher Ali Khan to British India. Afghanistan was allowed to retain its sovereignty but at the expense of handing its foreign policy to the British Empire. Afghanistan also lost territories south and north of the country by the establishment of the Durand line, which drew the border between Afghanistan and Pakistan. When Habibullah Khan became Emir of Afghanistan in 1901, British influence manifested itself in the building of a military academy, as well as the founding of a new school. Progressive reforms were put into place by Habibullah, who wanted to modernize Afghanistan. Western medicine, and technological advances such as the telegram were all introduced in Afghanistan. Seraj al Akhbar promoted these reforms in the country, and further imbued the country with a desire for independence. It was however dissolved before Afghanistan achieved independence in 1919.

=== Publication history ===
Seraj al Akhbar extracted most of its news from foreign newspapers. It was initially intended to provide news concerning Emir Habibullah, but as World War I broke out, Seraj al Akhbar began to express hostility towards Afghanistan's neutrality in Foreign affairs. News from Turkey was frequently printed in Seraj al Akhbar, and pro-Turkish sentiments began to develop among the Young Afghan coalition. The newspaper's continual push for independence, along with its anti-British sentiments led to the dissolution of the newspaper.

== Format and Style ==
When it was first published, Seraj al Akhbar used a large format (33 x 24 cm), with up to 14 pages of contents. The language was mostly Persian with a few articles in Arabic and Turkish. Foreign news was usually translated into the vernacular before being printed. Seraj al Akhbar was also an outlet for poets and short-story writers in Afghanistan. One section was dedicated to subscribers who wanted to write to the newspaper in praise of the Emir, while another printed scientific articles which encouraged industrialization and modernization.

== Reception ==
Seraj al Akhbar is regarded as being responsible for innovating the Persian language in Afghanistan. New forms of poetry were introduced as a result of the exposure the newspaper provided for poets. Afghans had to acquaint themselves to the academic language of the newspaper which was unfamiliar to a mostly illiterate population. The newspaper is also responsible for introducing French literature which was translated from Turkish to Persian. Due to such exposure to western ideals, conservative factions in the country demanded the dissolution of the newspaper and the exile of Tarzi and his followers.
