= Mahmud Tarzi =

Afghan politician, secular activist and journalist (1865–1933)

Allamah Mahmud Tarzi
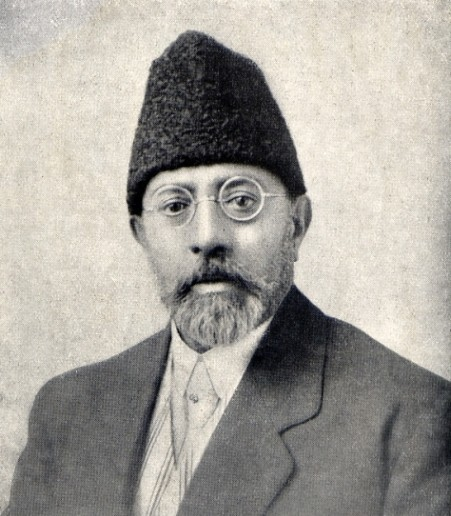
- Mahmud Tarzi in 1920

Foreign Minister of Afghanistan
- In office September 1924 – January 1927
- Monarch: Amanullah Khan
- Preceded by: Sardar Shir Ahmad
- Succeeded by: Ghulam Siddiq Khan Charkhi (acting)
- In office February 1919 – June 1922
- Monarch: Amanullah Khan
- Preceded by: Mohammad Aziz Khan
- Succeeded by: Mohammad Wali Khan Darwazi

Personal details
- Born: August 23, 1865 Ghazni, Emirate of Afghanistan
- Died: November 22, 1933 (aged 68) Istanbul, Turkey
- Resting place: Istanbul, Turkey

Mahmud Tarzi (Pashto: محمود طرزۍ; August 23, 1865 – November 22, 1933) was an Afghan politician and intellectual. He is known as the father of Afghan journalism. He became a key figure in the history of Afghanistan, following the lead of Mustafa Kemal Atatürk in Turkey by working for modernization and secularization, and strongly opposing religious extremism and obscurantism. Tarzi emulated the Young Turks coalition, with a "Young Afghans" coalition that emphasised independence of Afghanistan, with education and equality of all Afghans including women.

== Early years and first exile ==
Tarzi was born August 23, 1865, in Ghazni, Afghanistan. An ethnic Pashtun, his father was Ghulam Muhammad Tarzi, leader of the Mohammadzai royal house of Kandahar and a poet. His mother, Sultanat Begum belonged to Popalzai tribe, and was the fourth wife of his father. In 1881, shortly after Emir Abdur Rahman Khan came to power, Mahmud's father and the rest of the Tarzi family were expelled from Afghanistan. They first travelled to Karachi, Sindh, where they lived from January 1882 to March 1885. They then moved to the Ottoman Empire.

Tarzi began to explore the Middle East. He made a pilgrimage to Mecca, visited Paris, and toured the eastern Mediterranean. He also encountered Jamal ad-Din al-Afghani in Constantinople. On a second trip to Damascus, Syria, in 1891, Tarzi married the daughter of Saleh Al-Mossadiah, a muezzin of the Umayyad mosque. She became his second wife (the first, an Afghan, having died in Damascus). Tarzi stayed in Turkey until the age of 35, where he became fluent in a number of languages, including his native tongue Pashto as well as Dari, Turkish, French, Arabic, and Urdu.

During his 20 years in Damascus and Istanbul, he was exposed to and educated in European culture and progressive and pan-Islamist ideologies. His meetings with Jamal ad-Din al-Afghani convinced him that a progressive interpretation of the tenets of Islam would encourage the modernization that Muslim countries required.

== Return to Afghanistan and political career ==
A year after Abdur Rahman Khan's death in 1901, Habibullah Khan invited the Tarzi family, along with other educated Afghans, back to Afghanistan. Tarzi was appointed as the chief of the Bureau of Royal Court, tasked with informing and satisfying the Emir's curiosity to events within the Muslim world and Europe. There he began to introduce Western ideas in Afghanistan. Tarzi's daughter, Soraya Tarzi, married King Amanullah Khan and become Queen of Afghanistan and played a significant role regarding Amanullah's policy towards women.

Tarzi urged the Muslims of Afghanistan to learn science and technology, as well as mathematics, medicine, philosophy, geography, stressing that Islam emphasised both religious and secular education. He attacked prevalent cultural norms like the notion of the inferiority of women, and promoted women's education.

Like most other Afghan leaders, Tarzi was an Afghan nationalist who held many government positions in his life. He was a reform-minded individual amongst his extended family members whom ruled Afghanistan at the beginning of the 20th century and not unlike his father Sardar Ghulam Muhammad Khan Tarzi. After King Amanullah ascended the throne, Tarzi became Afghan Foreign Minister in 1919. Shortly thereafter, the Third Anglo-Afghan War began. After the national independence from the British in 1919, Tarzi established Afghan Embassies in London, Paris, and other capitals of the world. Tarzi would also go on to play a large role in the declaration of Afghanistan's independence. From 1922 to 1924, he served as Ambassador in Paris, France. He was then again placed as Foreign Minister from 1924 to 1927. Throughout his tenure in Afghanistan, Tarzi was a high government official during the reigns of King Habibullah and his son King Amanullah Khan.

=== Afghanistan's 1919 Independence ===
Tarzi effectively guided the second movement of the young constitutionalists called Mashroota Khwah. This led to reviving the first suppressed movement of the constitutionalists in Afghanistan.

=== Afghan Peace Conferences ===
During the Third Anglo-Afghan War in 1919, when Tarzi served as Foreign Minister, British India bombarded Kabul and Jalalabad. Over a ton of munitions hit Jalalabad in a single day. Tarzi was appointed head of the Afghan Delegation at the peace conferences at Mussoorie in 1920 and Kabul in 1921. The British, who had dealt with Tarzi before, attempted to reduce his position. After four months the talks collapsed because of the Durand Line. Sir Henry Dobbs led the British delegation to Kabul in January, 1921 – Mahmud Tarzi headed the Afghan group. After 11 months of discussions, the British and Afghans signed a peace treaty normalizing their relations. Although Afghanistan was the winner of the conference – as the British accepted Afghanistan's independence – Tarzi's diplomacy was shown as the British sent a message afterwards to Tarzi, giving their good will toward all tribes.

== Journalism and poetry ==
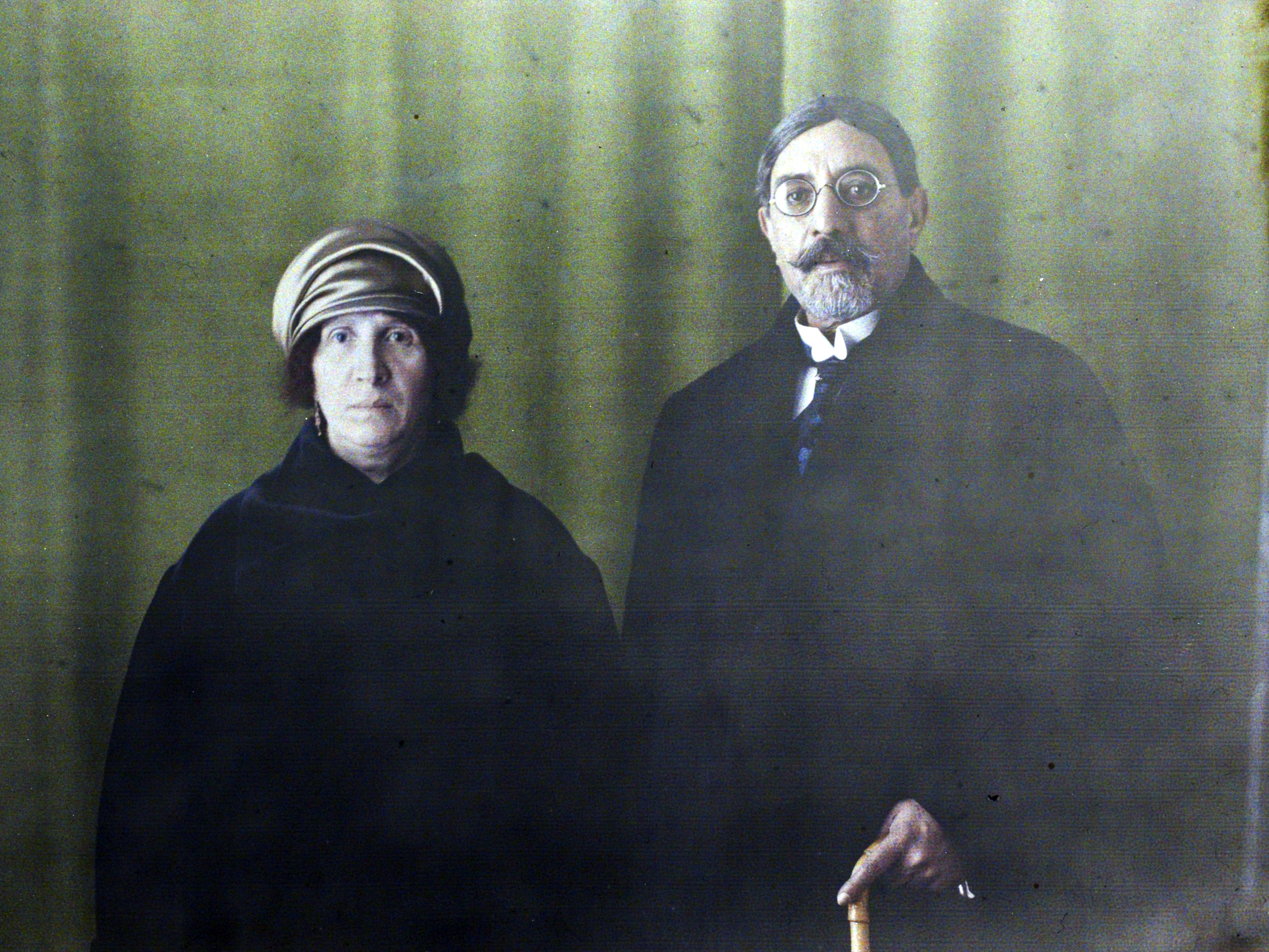
Mahmud Tarzi and his second wife, Asma Rasmiya Khanum. Autochrome portrait by Auguste Léon, 1922.

One of Tarzi's earliest works was the Account of a Journey (Sayahat-Namah-e Manzum), which was published in Lahore, British India (now Pakistan). However, Tarzi's most influential work – and the foundation of journalism in Afghanistan – was his publishing of Seraj-al-Akhbar. This newspaper was published bi-weekly from October 1911 to January 1919. It played an important role in the development of an Afghan modernist movement, serving as a forum for a small, enlightened group of young Afghans, who provided the ethical justification and basic tenets of Afghan nationalism and modernism under of the very first political party, Party of the Afghan Youth, ideologically secularist, monarchist and state nationalist with a right-of centre political direction, in opposition to the later Constitutional Party, a second political party whose ideologically liberal democratic, reformist, progressive with a constitutional monarchist and left-wing nationalist direction maintaining a strong anticlerical secularist state and within centrist politics. Tarzi also published Seraj-al-Atfal (Children's Lamp), the first Afghan publication aimed at a juvenile audience.

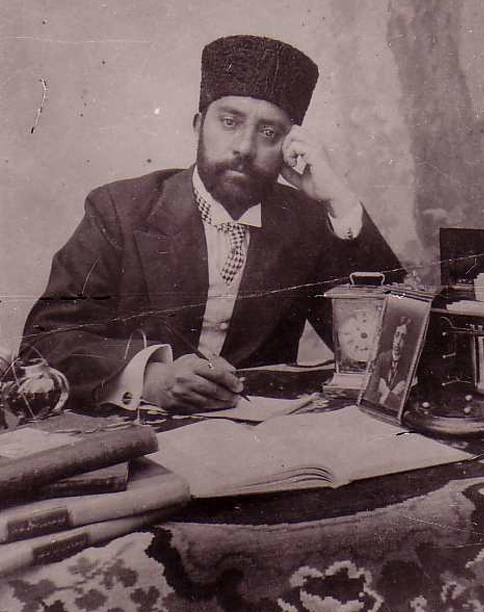
Mahmud Tarzi as Seraj al Akhbar Chief Clerk

Tarzi was the first who introduced the novel in Afghanistan and translated many English and French novels to Persian. He also contributed in editing, translations, and modernization of the Afghan press. He translated into Persian many major works of European authors, such as Around the World in Eighty Days, Twenty Thousand Leagues Under the Seas, The Mysterious Island, International Law (from Turkish), and the History of the Russo-Japanese War. When he lived in Turkey and Syria, he immersed himself in reading and research, using Western literary and scientific sources. In Damascus, Tarzi wrote The Garden of Learning, containing choice articles about literary, artistic, travel and scientific matters. Another book entitled The Garden of Knowledge (later published in Kabul), concludes with an article "My beloved country, Afghanistan", in which he tells his Afghan countrymen how much he longs for his native land and recalls with nostalgia the virtues of its climate, mountains and deserts. In 1914, his novel Travel Across Three Continents in Twenty-Nine Days published. In the preface, he makes an apt comment about travel and history:

Although age has its normal limits, it may be extended by two things-the study of history and by travel. Reading history broadens one's perception of the creation of the world, while travel extends one's field of vision.

== Second exile and death ==
The reforms and changes to cultural norms brought about by Amanullah, especially the changes to women's status irked the religious ulama, resulting in a revolt by some tribes and a civil war. An armed group called the Saqqawists, led by Habibullah Kalakani defeated Amanullah in the civil war, and Amanullah had to escape to India in 1929.

Tarzi followed King Amanullah into exile and left Afghanistan, first for India and then Europe and Turkey. He died on November 22, 1933, at the age of 68 in Istanbul, Turkey due to liver cancer.

== Legacy ==
Mahmud Tarzi's legacy lies in his role in shaping modern Afghan nationalism, journalism and reformist thought. Through his newspaper Seraj al-Akhbar (1911–1918), he promoted national unity, education, scientific knowledge, economic development, independence and the compatibility of Islam with modernisation. He also advocated women's education and to connect Afghanistan intellectually with developments in other parts of the world.

Modern Afghan intellectuals continue to invoke Tarzi on discussions related to education, national unity and development. His advocacy of women's education and the early Afghan girls' schools setup by his son-in-law King Amanullah and daughter Soraya Tarzi also provides an indigenous Afghan precedent for women's education.

== See also ==
- Soraya Tarzi
- Reforms of Amānullāh Khān and civil war
