= Princess Shah Gul Jahan =

Afghan princess

- Born: 1928
- Died: Unknown
- Occupations: Royal Princess of Afghanistan, Chair of Anjuman-i Himayat-i-Niswan
- Spouse: Sardar Muhammad Husain Jan
- Parents: Habibullah Khan (father); Sitara Begum (mother)
- Relatives: Amanullah Khan (Half-Brother)

Princess Shah Gul Jahan also known as Kubra Jahan Begum but commonly called Princess Kubrah or Princess Kobra (fl. 1928 – ?), was a royal princess of Afghanistan.

She was born to Habibullah Khan (r. 1901–1919) and one of his 44 wives, Sitara Begum, a Shighnani Consort. She was thus one of the 28 half sisters of king Amanullah Khan (r. 1919–1929).

She married Sardar Muhammad Husain Jan (born 1900), the second son of Sardar Muhammad Umar Khan.

In 1919, her half brother succeeded to the throne, and launched a radical modernization of Afghanistan. The royal harem was dissolved and its slaves manumitted. The modernization included a change in women's position. This change was supported by the king's mother, and his queen Soraya Tarzi and his sisters acted as role models by unveiling, adopting Western fashion and taking on public roles. Kubra was to take an active role in the issue of women's rights.

In 1928, Princess Sahira Begum Siraj Al Banat and her sister-in-law queen Soraya co-founded the women's organisation Anjuman-i Himayat-i-Niswan, and Princess Kubrah was appointed to chair the organization. Princess Kubrah was to "coordinate, supervise, and guide" its work concerning women’s liberation, and its office in Kabul, to which women were encouraged to come to report mistreatment and learn of their new rights, had twelve active members to assist her.

In 1929, however, her brother was deposed and exiled, and his reforms in favor of women's rights were reverted, resulting in women returning to purdah for another twenty years.
