= Princess Sahira Begum Siraj Al Banat =

Afghan princess

Princess Sahira Begum (Pashto: ساحره بیګم; born 1902) nicknamed Bibi Gul, and known best as Seraj al-Banat, was a royal princess of Afghanistan.

She was born to Habibullah Khan (r. 1901–1919) and Sarwar Sultana Begum, and the sister of king Amanullah Khan (r. 1919–1929).

She married in 1919 to General H.E. Taj-i-Afghan ‘Ali Ahmad Jan Shaghasi (1883–1929), Minister for Home Affairs 1919–1920, Governor of Kabul 1925–1929.

In 1919, her brother succeeded to the throne, and launched a radical modernization of Afghanistan. The royal harem was dissolved and its slaves manumitted. The modernization included a change in women's position. This change was supported by the king's mother, and his queen Soraya Tarzi and his sisters acted as role models by unveiling, adopting Western fashion and taking on public roles.

She often participated in social work and campaigns raising social awareness among women. In 1923, she criticized the prevailing concept of women’s inferiority in a public gathering in Kabul:

"Some people are laughing at us, saying that women know only how to eat and drink. Old women discourage young women by saying their mothers never starved to death because they could not read or write....But knowledge is not man’s monopoly. Women also deserve to be knowledgeable. We must on the one hand bring up healthy children and, on the other hand, help men in their work. We must read about famous women in this world, to know that women can achieve exactly what men can achieve."

In 1924, she was appointed general director of the Masturat Hospital, which was the first hospital for women in Kabul.

In 1928, she and her sister-in-law queen Soraya co-founded the women's organisation Anjuman-i Himayat-i-Niswan (1928), which was chaired by her half-sister, Princess Shah Gul Jahan.

In 1929, however, her brother was deposed and exiled, and his reforms in favor of women's rights were reverted, resulting in women returning to purdah for another twenty years. Her spouse proclaimed himself Emir at Jalalabad on 17 January 1929 after the departure of King Amanullah, but was defeated by Habibullāh Kalakāni at Jagdalak in February 1929, captured at Kandahar 9 May 1929 and imprisoned in Kabul.
