= Princess Safariya Samar Al-Siraj =

Afghan princess

Princess Safariya Samar Al-Siraj (born 1904), was a royal princess of Afghanistan.

She was born to Habibullah Khan (r. 1901–1919) and Sarwar Sultana Begum, and the sister of king Amanullah Khan (r. 1919–1929).

She married in 1920 to Field Marshal H.R.H. Sardar Shah Wali Khan Ghazi.

In 1919, her brother succeeded to the throne, and launched a radical modernization of Afghanistan. The royal harem was dissolved and its slaves manumitted. The modernization included a change in women's position. This change was supported by the king's mother, and his queen Soraya Tarzi and his sisters acted as role models by unveiling, adopting Western fashion and taking on public roles.

In 1929, however, her brother was deposed and exiled, and his reforms in favor of women's rights were reverted, resulting in women returning to purdah for another twenty years.
