= Women's Welfare Association =

Afghani women's organization

Muassasa-i Khayriyya-i Zanan ('Women's Welfare Association', or WWA), also known as the 'Women's Society' and from 1975 called (Afghan) Women's Institute (WI), was a women's organization in Afghanistan, founded in 1946. It was also known as Da Mirmanesh Tulane or Da Mermano Tolana ('The Women's Society') (DMT). It became independent of the government in 1975 and was renamed the "(Afghan) Women's Institute" or WI. From 1953, it published its own publication, Mirman.

== History ==
=== Background ===
King Amanullah Khan and Queen Soraya Tarzi had promoted women's rights in the reform program in the 1920s, as well as establishing the first women's organisation (Anjuman-i Himayat-i-Niswan), but after their deposition in 1929, their reforms had been abolished. After the Second World War, however, the government saw a need to reform Afghan society, and women's emancipation was a part of that policy.

The WWA was established during a period of reform in women's rights: women were allowed to study at the Kabul University in 1950, and from that point onward, educated middle class and upper-class women started to be employed at state institutions such as banks, libraries and the air line in the major cities. There was a need for the government to support these changes by use of a specific organization.

=== Establishment ===
The organization was originally established under the name Da Mirmanech Tulaneh or Da Mermeno Tolana ('The Women's Society') (DMT) in the city of Kabul in 1946 by a Frenchwoman married to an Afghan, Madame Asin, but it was soon taken over by the Ministry of Finance, who from 1947 onward provided it with most of its founding. It was administered by the Ministry of Education until 1950.

Among its founding members were Zaynab Inayat Siraj and Bibi Jan, women of the royal family, and the wives of public and government officials were inducted as its staff and members. Queen Humaira Begum acted as its first Honorary president and official patron, while the acting president was Zaynab Inayat Siraj or Zeynab Enayet Saraj, cousin of king Amanullah Khan, who had lived in exile in Iran and thus had experience of the ongoing modernization of that country under the Shah.

Among its many notable members were Halima Rafat and Nafeesa Shayeq.

=== Activity ===
The WWA worked for women's reforms in collaboration with the government's modernization process, and basically acted as the government's organ for women's rights. The director of the WWA, Kubra Noorzai, participated in the work on the new Constitution of 1964, which introduced women's suffrage, and was elected as one of the first women of parliament.

The object of the WWA was to work for the elevation of women's status in society. They promoted women's emancipation from gender segregation by encouraging unveiling, but mainly by promoting women's work, literacy, family planning, and vocational classes. They encouraged women's participation in society by organizing charity functions, and women's education and professional work by organizing schools for girls and classes in various subjects for adult women at the offices of the WWA around the country.

The WWA supported the voluntary abolition of the veil, which was realized in August 1959, on the second day of the festival of Jeshyn, when Queen Humaira and Princess Bilqis appeared in the royal box at the military parade unveiled, alongside the Prime Minister's wife, Zamina Begum. In connection to the dress reform of 1959 was also a project connected to the women's courses given by the WWA. After having observed that the veil had become optional, a group of foreign women, notably the American Jeanne Beecher, organized sewing classes at the Women's Welfare Association's School for Girls in Kabul, after having acquired assistance from Vogue Pattern Service, with the intention of teaching Afghan women to learn to manufacture Western fashion. The sewing classes, which was attended by Afghan upper-class women who had until then lived in purdah, was followed by a fashion show at the United States Information Center auditorium, and after this, the upper-class women of Kabul started to wear Western fashion in the streets of Kabul.

The WWA acted as the mouthpiece of the government's women's policy inside Afghanistan, but it also played an important role in Afghan foreign policy. It was a part of policy to attract foreign financial aid by presenting a modern image of Afghanistan to the world, and the WWA, consisting as it did of educated and often professional urban elite women, provided an image of modernity and progress to the outside world. The Polish reporter Andrzej Binkowski, who visited Kabul in the 1950s, did note the great contrast between the WWA president, who were a modern woman in Western fashion, and the majority of women in Kabul, who in the 1950s still lived in purdah, only left the house dressed in burka and never spoke to a nonrelated male except through a door. In 1957, Afghanistan sent their representatives to the Afro-Asian Women's Conference. A delegation from the WWA was sent to the USSR in 1962, and to the Women's International Democratic Federation's Fifth World Congress of Women (June 24–29, 1963) in Moscow.

Branches of the WWA were founded in Herat, Kandahar and Mazar-i-Sharif. Eventually, it had branch offices in ten cities, and eight thousand members. However, despite their work in establishing local offices and their attempts to engage rural women, the WWA never managed to spread outside of the circle of urban elite women.

== See also ==
- Democratic Women's Organisation of Afghanistan
