= Halima Rafat =

Afghan nurse and women's rights activist

Halima Rafat was an Afghan nurse and women's rights activist. She was one of the first two nurses of her country, and belonged to the pioneer generation of professional women in Afghanistan.

Ayesha Maqsudi and Halima Rafat were the first two nurses in Afghanistan. She began her nursing career in Kabul in 1932. She thus belonged to the first professional women in Afghanistan. This was a time period were women normally lived secluded in purdah, since the reforms of women's rights enacted by king Amanullah Khan and queen Soraya Tarzi in the 1920s had been reverted after their deposition in 1929, and the 1930s were a period of reactionary conservatism, and she experienced difficulties because of it. She was mainly active within administration.

In the 1940s, things started to change again and in 1946, she was reportedly one of the founding members of the Women's Welfare Association, which were to result in a reform of women's rights in the 1950s. She was an active supporter of a reform in women's rights in the new women's movement that developed during the 1950s. She was reported to be the first woman to deliver a speech in Pashto on the Pashtonistan day at Women's General Park in Kabul. She attended several conferences of women's rights.

She retired in 1977.
