= Princess Razia Begum Noor Seraj =

20th century Afghan Princess

- Born: 1909; Emirate of Afghanistan
- Died: November 13, 1991 (aged 81–82); Italy
- Spouse: Sardar Mohammad Hassan Khan
- Children: 1 son and 1 daughter
- Parents: Emir Habibullah Khan (father); Sarwar Sultana Begum (mother)

Princess Razia Begum Noor Seraj (born 1909), was a royal princess of Afghanistan.

She was born to Habibullah Khan (r. 1901-1919) and Sarwar Sultana Begum, and the sister of king Amanullah Khan (r. 1919–1929).

She married in married in 1927 to H.E. Sardar-i-Ala Muhammad Hasan Jan, GCVO (born 1908), Court Chamberlain and Civil ADC to King Amanullah. Muhammad Hasan Jan was a grandson of Abdur Rahman Khan by his father.

In 1919, her brother succeeded to the throne, and launched a radical modernization of Afghanistan. The royal harem was dissolved and its slaves manumitted. The modernization included a change in women's position. This change was supported by the king's mother, and his queen Soraya Tarzi and his sisters acted as role models by unveiling, adopting Western fashion and taking on public roles.

In 1929, however, her brother was deposed and exiled, and his reforms in favor of women's rights were reverted, resulting in women returning to purdah for another twenty years.

Her and her husband moved to Italy, where she died on 13 November 1991.
