= Gunnel Gummeson =

Swedish educator; missing since 1956

Gunnel Gummeson. An undated photograph.

Gunnel Gummeson (born 1930, declared dead in absentia 8 February 1977) was a Swedish school teacher, last seen travelling in northern Afghanistan with her American fiancé Peter Winant in 1956. The extensive investigations were hampered by official corruption and codes of loyalty to clan chiefs. None of the later sightings were confirmed, and the case of their disappearance has never been solved.

== Disappearance ==
Gummeson was a teacher from Hultsfred in Småland who moved to Nora in Bergslagen when she was two years old. After having worked as a volunteer social worker in India, she decided to return to Sweden by land travel together with her boyfriend Peter Winant, who had previous experience in travelling in Afghanistan. On 20 May 1956, she posted a letter to her parents in the post office of Kabul, where she informed them about her travelling plans. A couple of days later, the couple was seen disembarking a truck in the city of Sheberghan in northern Afghanistan. According to witness statements, they followed one of their fellow passengers, who rented out rooms. The last confirmed sighting was when they were seen entering a doorway in the city.

== First investigation ==
Winant's father, Frederick Winant, made investigations which indicated that they had been seen continuing on their way to Herat. He complained to the Afghan government, which instigated an investigation. Three governors were fired, 10,000 riders were sent out and so many people were arrested that the jails became overcrowded, according to the reports of the Swedish embassy advisor Lennart Petri. None of the information after they left Sheberghan was confirmed, however, and reports that they had been seen in Qaisar were disregarded by Afghan authorities. In 1961, the investigations were finally completed and the foreign minister of Afghanistan gave a formal statement concluding that both missing persons were likely to have been murdered in Sheberghan.

== Second investigation ==
In May 1963, the State Secretary for Foreign Affairs, Leif Belfrage, received a confidential personal letter from the US ambassador J. Graham Parsons with the information that Gummeson was likely being kept in captivity as the daughter-in-law of a wealthy clan chief in Qaisar, Kala Khan, and also that she had allegedly had to give birth to a son. The source of this information was a Pashtun, a secret Christian convert, who had acquired the information during his military service and passed it on to an American priest.

According to the Pashtun, who was referred to in the diplomatic correspondence as "Joe", it was common knowledge in Maimana that Winant had been killed and that Gummeson had been sold to the khan; the public was loyal to the khan, and the province governor had been bribed. Asked by the American priest, "Joe" travelled to Maimana territory dressed as a toy merchant, entered the summer camp of Kala Khan and there met a blond boy with European features. His attempts to contact the boy's mother failed and he was forced to flee.

The Swedish foreign office and ambassador Dick Hichens-Bergström took the information seriously and discussed a rescue operation by helicopter. In June, Mohammad Zahir Shah sent a team of 175 elite soldiers dressed as road workers to search through every village and nomad camp for Gummeson. The only blond female Westerner they found, however, was a Russian woman who assured them that she was there voluntarily and happily married to a local Afghan.

== Aftermath ==
The Gummeson case attracted a lot of attention and media coverage and was also mentioned in contemporary travel guides. The newspaper Aftonbladet sent crime reporter Börje Heed to Afghanistan to track Gummeson. The last report about the case was an article in Aftonbladet from 1967, in which two tourists, who had read about the case, reported that they had seen an unusually blond boy in northwest Afghanistan. The fate of Gummeson and Winant remains unknown. On 8 February 1977, Gummeson was officially declared presumed dead by a court in Lindesberg.

== In fiction ==
The Gummeson case was the inspiration of a novel by Gert Holmertz: Muren i Maimana ('Maimana Wall') SAK förlag/Premiss förlag (2004). In this novel, the theory about Gummeson having survived the death of Winant and of having been sold as the daughter-in-law to the clan chief Kala Khan is fictionalized. In the novel, Gummeson is raped by the son of Kala Khan after the murder of Winant and, after having become pregnant, is forced to marry her attacker; she is then offered a chance to return to Sweden on the condition that she leave her child behind, but unable to leave her child, she agrees to remain in Afghanistan, and gets accustomed to living in purdah, and would therefore be never discovered by any search teams.

== See also ==
- Aurora Nilsson
- List of people who disappeared mysteriously (1910–1970)
