= Sarwar Sultana Shaghasi =

Afghan royal consort to Habibullah Khan (1875 – 1965)

- The First Official Queen Consort of Afghanistan
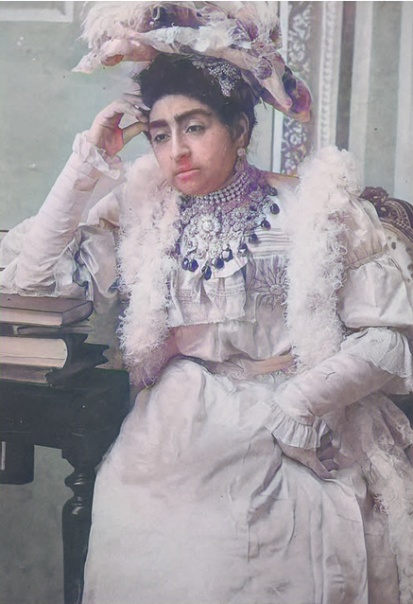
- Born: 1875; Kabul, Emirate of Afghanistan
- Died: 1965 (aged 89–90); Istanbul, Turkey
- Spouse: Prince Habibullah I, Prince of Afghanistan
- Issue: Amanullah Khan
- Father: Loinab Sher Dil Khan

Queen Sarwar Sultana Shaghasi (Pashto: سرور سلطانه شغاسي) was the first queen consort of Afghanistan (1875 – 1965). Her Majesty was given the royal title of Serāj-ul-Khawātīn (Lamp of the Ladies), the Aliya Hazrat. She was married to Emir Habibullah Khan (r. 1901–1919), who was referred to as Serāj-ul-Millat wa ad-Dīn (Lamp of the Nation and Religion), and was the mother of King Amanullah Khan (r. 1919–1929). Denoted in Leon B. Poullada's book "Reform and Rebellion in Afghanistan, 1919-1929", she set out to exert all her considerable skill, intelligence, and influence to prepare Amanullah for the throne. He goes on to say that "the indomitable lady, who was later to be described by Major Fraser in her moment of defeat and exile as "this interesting old eagle," summoned her most experienced kinsmen to act as Amanullah's tutors." Her kinsmen were members of the Shaghasi family, and by "this interesting old eagle," Major Fraser was referring to this courageous queen consort of Afghanistan who stretched her limits, did not accept the status quo, but rather reached higher and become more.

== Life ==
=== Early life and marriage ===
She was the daughter of Loinab Sher Dil Khan of Shaghasi, who was chamberlain to Dost Mohammad Khan, Lord Chamberlain to Sher Ali Khan and Great Governor of Balkh during his reign (1863–66 and 1868–79). Her sister, Tajawar Sultana Shaghasi married Sardar Mohammad Ali Khan Mohammadzai and they had two sons, Sardar Yunus Khan and Sardar Mohammad Wali Jan. Her brother, Loinab (chief minister) Khush Dil Khan of the Shaghasi (born 1844) was the deputy commander in the battle of Maiwand and father to Ali Ahmad Khan (1883-1929) who was married to Princess Sahira Begum Siraj Al Banat, Sarwar Sultana's daughter.

She was one of the four-officially wedded wives of king Habibullah Khan. Like his predecessors, Habibullah Khan had four official wives and a large number of unofficial wives as well as slave concubines in the royal Harem Sara palace complex in Kabul. Her husband was known to have even more wives than was common, having at least 44 official or unofficial wives, among them Ulya Janab, but H. M. the Aliya Hazrat Queen Sarwar Sultana Shaghasi was his official queen consort among the four main wives. This would make the Aliya Hazrat Queen Sarwar Sultana Shaghasi the first queen consort in the modern history of Afghanistan. In 1919, her son succeeded to the throne, giving her a prominent position as the king's mother.

=== King's mother ===
She had an influential position at court during the reign of her son. Her son enacted a radical modernisation of the country, which included a reform in the position of women. This affected the royal court as well, as he dissolved the royal harem and freed the enslaved bonds women of the Harem Sara palace complex.

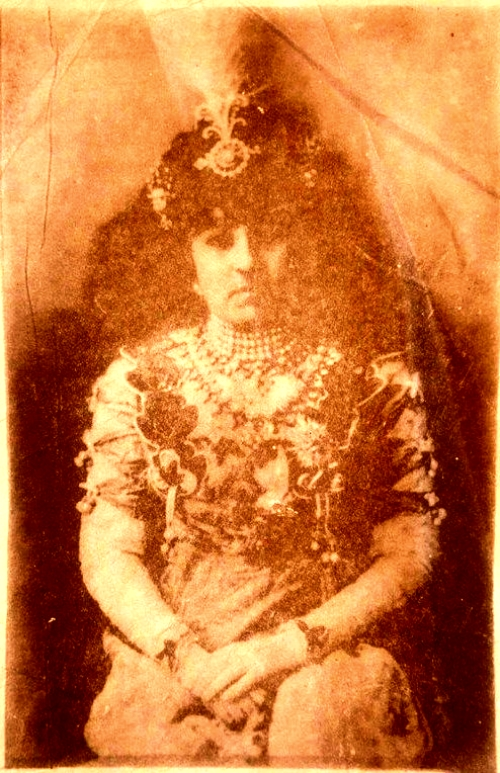
H. M. the Aliya Hazrat Queen Sarwar Sultana Shaghasi Serāj-ul-Khawātīn (Lamp of the Ladies) with her Royal Crown.

She was described by the Swedish memoir writer Aurora Nilsson, who lived in Afghanistan with her Afghan husband in 1926–27. Nilsson visited the royal court in Paghman and Darullaman, and includes descriptions in her book of queen consort Soraya Tarzi well as the mother of the king. With their encouragement, Nilsson talked to them about European customs. Nilsson befriended the king's mother, whom she describes as influential and dominant, demonstrated dance and gymnastics for her and acted as her photographer. Nilsson described the king's mother as supportive of his modernisation reforms, and eager to assist her daughter-in-law in her role as a role model for a new modern Afghan woman. Her daughters also notably adopted Western fashion. She was noted to be tall and strict.

=== Later life and death ===
Her son was deposed in 1929, and left the country. She died in exile in Istanbul in 1965.

== Issue ==
1. Amanullah Khan, king 1919–1929
2. Princess Sahira Begum Siraj Al Banat (born 1902), married in 1919 to General H.E. Taj-i-Afghan ‘Ali Ahmad Jan Shaghasi. She was the co-founder of the Anjuman-i Himayat-i-Niswan (1928) and the general director of the Masturat Hospital (1924).
3. Princess Safariya Samar Al-Siraj (born 1904), married in 1920 to Field Marshal H.R.H. Sardar Shah Wali Khan Ghazi.
4. Princess Razia Begum Noor Seraj (born 1909), married in 1927 to H.E. Sardar-i-Ala Muhammad Hasan Jan, GCVO (b. 1908), Court Chamberlain and Civil ADC to King Amanullah.

== See also ==
- Barakzai dynasty
- Mohammadzai
- Shaghasi
