= Muhammad Hasan =

- Sardar-i-'Ala (Prince) of Afghanistan
- Born: 1902
- Died: Rome, Italy
- Spouse: Princess Razia Begum Noor Seraj
- Issue: Prince Abdullah Hasan; Princess Halima Hasan
- House: Barakzai
- Father: Muhammad 'Umar Khan
- Mother: Bibi Daulat

Muhammad Hasan (born 1902, date of death unknown) was a Prince in the Afghan House of Barakzai.

== Biography ==
Prince Hasan born in 1902 and was the third son of General HRH Sardar Muhammad 'Umar Khan and his fourth wife, Bibi Daulat.

Prince Hasan served as Aide-de-Camp to King Amānullāh Khān during the period 1926-1927 and as Court Chamberlain during the period 1927-1928. In October 1927, he married Princess Razia, a younger daughter of King Habibullah Khan. They had one son (Prince Abdullah Hasan, b. February 1929) and one daughter (Princess Halima Hasan, b 4 June 1939).

He entered into exile in Italy in 1929 as a result of the successful rebellion against the King led by Habibullāh Kalakāni. With his wife, he founded the Rome Mosque. He died in Rome, Italy.

== Honours ==
| Year | Award |
|---|---|
| 1926 | Granted the title of Sardar-i-'Ala |
| | 1st class of the (Afghan) Order of the Leader |
| 1927 | Grand Cross of the (Egyptian) Order of Ismail |
| 1928 | Knight Grand Cross of the (Italian) Order of Saints Maurice and Lazarus |
| 1928 | Grand Cross of the (Belgian) Order of Leopold II |
| 1928 | Honorary Knight Grand Cross of the (British) Royal Victorian Order |
| 1928 | Grand Cross of the (Polish) Order of Polonia Restituta |
| 1928 | Knight Commander of the (Iranian) Order of the Crown |
| 1928 | Grand Officier of the (French) Légion d'honneur |
