= Queen Soraya =

Queen Soraya may refer to:

- Soraya Tarzi (1899–1968), wife of King Amanullah Khan of Afghanistan, known as Queen Soraya
- Soraya Esfandiary-Bakhtiary (1932–2001), second wife of Mohammad Reza Pahlavi of Iran, known during her marriage as Queen Soraya
