= Irshad-e Naswan =

First women's magazine in Afghanistan (1921–29)

Irshad-e Naswan (Note: Pashto: ارشاد نسوان Dari: ارشاد نسوان) (lit. 'The guide for women') was a women's magazine issued in Afghanistan founded in 1921 being the first women's magazine in the country. The magazine was founded by Queen Soraya Tarzi. It was founded as a part of the king and queen's modernization project to reform Afghan society, a policy which included the emancipation of women, and the Irshad-e Naswan as well as the first women's association Anjuman-i Himayat-i-Niswan were both founded to support the state feminism of the royal government.

== Publishing history ==
The magazine was published weekly and ran articles "on the rights of women, child care, home economics and etiquette", social, political and international issues, women's rights but also fashion and household tips. It took up subject in women's issues and reform and has played a major pioneering role in the history of women in Afghanistan, and has been described as the first newspaper to enlighten women in Afghanistan.

It was edited by the queen's mother, Asma Rasmya, who thus became the first female editor in Afghanistan, and queen Soraya herself occasionally contributed to it.

== Closure ==
King Amanullah Khan and Queen Soraya Tarzi were deposed in 1929. Their deposition from power was followed by a severe backlash on women's rights under their successor Habibullah Ghazi. The Women's Association Anjuman-i Himayat-i-Niswan as well as Irshad-e Naswan was banned, the girls' schools were closed, and the female students who had been allowed to study in Turkey was recalled to Afghanistan and forced to put on the veil and enter purdah again.
