= Aurora Nilsson =

Swedish writer

Aurora Nilsson (1 January 1894 – 26 June 1972), also known as Rora Asim Khan, was a Swedish writer who became known for her autobiographical depiction, The Flight from a Harem (Flykten från harem), about her experiences in Afghanistan during her marriage to an Afghan diplomat, Asim Khan, in the 1920s. Her autobiography gives a valuable insight in the life of a harem in 1920s Afghanistan. Her divorce (1927) was at the time unique in Afghanistan.

A novel by Thomas Löfström is based upon her story.

== Early life and marriage ==
Nilsson was born in Västerhaninge in 1894. By 1925, she was studying art in Berlin; the Golden Twenties was a vibrant period in the history of the city. There she met and married Asim Khan, an Afghan who was the son of a former government minister, who was studying technique at the expense of the Afghan government. The Afghan embassy acknowledged the marriage after Nilsson signed a statement that she would accept Afghan customs and, some time in the future, convert to Islam. She never did convert, however.

== Life in Afghanistan ==
The newly-married couple travelled to Afghanistan in 1926. During the journey, Khan changed, according to Nilsson, from a modern man to a man more and more influenced of Afghan customs the closer they came to his homeland. En route he abused her twice. In Kabul, Nilsson was severely shocked about her new living conditions and was not able to adjust herself to them. She was forced to wear a veil (hijab) and was not allowed to leave the house except with her husband's permission, nor look out of the windows, or to talk when she visited a shop (purdah).

She also discovered that her husband had a slave woman who was called his servant, who had been given to him as to function as his concubine when he was a teenager, as was the common custom. She was shocked by the existence of the slave concubine, who was referred to as a "secondary wife", and who reacted with hostility to the arrival of Nilsson; the slave was discovered with a poison, and it was suspected that she had planned to poison Nilsson.

Nilsson aroused a lot of attention in Kabul, where she was called "Tyska frun" (literary: "The German wife") and was admired for her white skin, which was seen as a mark of beauty and status. She described how she visited one upper class elite woman "whose entire life" was lived within the space of her harem rooms, which she was never allowed to leave; the woman was ill, and her husband asked Nilsson how he could be able to acquire a new woman with as white skin as Nilsson.

Her husband was not given any governmental employment, because she had not converted. He therefore gave her permission to visit the government, the royal court, and women in different positions to try to get him a job. In her book, she describes the people, customs and events of contemporary Afghanistan. With the help of Khan's aunt, who was a lady-in-waiting to the queen, she visited the royal court in Paghman and Darullaman, (Note: possibly referring to the Tajbeg Palace in Darullaman) and includes descriptions in her book of queen consort Soraya Tarzi, a Syrian-educated moderniser, and the mother of the king, Ulya (Ulli) Hazrat, whose name she spells as Ollja Hassrat. With their encouragement, she talked a lot with the royal women about European customs. She befriended the king's mother, who she describes as influential and dominant, demonstrated modern western dance and gymnastics for her and acted as her photographer.

She failed to acquire a position for Khan, who threatened to kill or to sell her. According to Nilsson, a German woman, the widow of an Afridi man named Abdullah Khan, had fled to the city with her children from her late husband's successor, was sold at public auction and obtained her freedom by being bought by the German diplomatic mission for 7,000 marks.

In 1927, Nilsson managed to be granted a divorce with the support of the German diplomatic mission. The divorce was described as unique, as it was not the custom for a woman to divorce a man. The German diplomatic mission helped her to get a room in a hotel while she waited for money from Sweden to leave the country. Her divorce was viewed as a scandal in Kabul, and she was harassed, also by the officials she visited for help. The officials denied her divorce on the grounds that she was a Muslim despite the fact that she had never converted, claimed she needed an Afghan passport to leave the country, and offered her money to return to her former husband. When she finally arrived at the border, she was again stopped with an offer of money if she returned to marriage. She declined with the words: "No, I do not need any money! I need nothing from Afghanistan! Only my freedom!"

== Aftermath ==
After her divorce, Nilsson returned to Sweden, where she published a book about her experiences in 1928. In 1930, Nilsson married ice-hockey player Carl Abrahamsson.

The divorce reportedly caused her ex-husband to lose face in Afghan society and prevented him from gaining any political post. He murdered three officials at the British embassy and in 1933 was executed. He was motivated by the desire to create conflict between the pro-British king Mohammed Nadir Shah and Great Britain, thereby bringing about the fall of Nadir and the reinstatement of the deposed king Amanullah Khan. His act is considered to have contributed to the deposition by assassination of King Nadir later the same year.

Aurora Nilsson lived with her second husband Carl Abrahamsson in Södertälje. She became widowed in 1948, and died 26 June 1972 in Södertälje.

== Work ==
- Flykten från harem (literary: 'The Flight from a Harem'; 1928)

== In popular culture ==
Aurora Nilsson was the model for the character in the Swedish novel Gryningsflickan (The girl of the dawn) by Swedish writer Tomas Löfström (1986), which was awarded the prize "Novel of the Year" by Bra Böcker in 1986.

== See also ==
- Gunnel Gummeson
- Betty Mahmoody
- European influence in Afghanistan
- Phyllis Chesler
