= Anjuman-i Himayat-i-Niswan =

Former women's organization in Afghanistan

Anjuman-i Himayat-i-Niswan ('Association for the Protection of Women') was a women's organization in Afghanistan, founded in 1928. It was the first women's organization in Afghanistan.

It was founded by the king's sister Princess Sahira Begum Seraj al-Banat and Queen Soraya Tarzi, and was chaired by the king's sister, Princess Kubrah. It was founded as a part of the king and queen's modernization project to reform society, a policy which included the emancipation of women. Princess Kubrah was to "coordinate, supervise, and guide" its work concerning women’s liberation, and its office in Kabul had twelve active members to assist her.

Its purpose was to encourage women to use the new reformed laws in women's rights introduced by King Amanullah Khan, such as the ban on polygamy and the new marriage and divorce law, and to enforce the policy of women's emancipation introduced by the government. Women were encouraged to refuse the veil and gender segregation in the example of the Queen, to educate themselves and become professionals in order to contribute to society. The organization had an office in Kabul, to were women could come and seek assistance by appealing to the new reformed laws of the king and report their husbands, brothers and fathers if they mistreated them.

The emancipation policy was however extremely controversial and difficult to enforce in Afghan society, and King Amanullah Khan and Queen Sorya Tarzi were deposed in 1929. Their deposition from power was followed by a severe backlash on women's rights under their successor Habibullah Ghazi, who banned school for girls, reintroduced the veil and forced women back into gender segregation. The Women's Association Anjuman-i Himayat-i-Niswan as well as the women's magazine Irshad-e Naswan was banned, the girls 'schools were closed, and the female students who had been allowed to study in Turkey was recalled to Afghanistan and forced to put on the veil and enter purdah again.

The women's movement in Afghanistan was not resumed until after the Second World War, with the foundation of the Women's Welfare Association, which was founded in 1946.
