= Shaghasi =

Family of the Barakzai dynasty, Afghanistan

Shaghasi شاغاسیان (شاغاسی خیل)
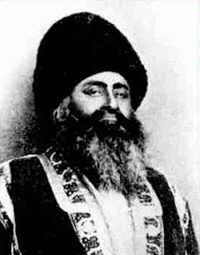
- Loinab Sher Dil Khan Shaghasi, Chamberlain of Dost Mohammad Khan & Sher Ali Khan, Governor of Balkh & Turkistan.
- Ethnicity: Pashtun
- Location: Afghanistan
- Parent tribe: Barakzai
- Language: Pashto

The Shaghasi, alongside the Seraj and Telai, are a prominent and powerful cadet-branch of the Afghan royal family. They belong to the Zirak branch of the Durrani confederacy, and are primarily centered around Kandahar. They can also be found in other provinces throughout central Afghanistan.

The Shaghasi Khel held more influence than the Mohammadzai during the reign of Emir Sher Ali Khan - Emir of Afghanistan, and Emir Amanullah Khan - Emir of Afghanistan (February 28, 1919 – 1926), later King of Afghanistan (1926 - January 14, 1929). Shaghasi Barakzai are closely related to Amanullah Khan. Queen Sawar Sultana Shaghasi daughter of Loinab Sher Dil Khan of Shaghasi, Governor of Balkh was King Amanullah Khan's mother.

Ali Ahmad Khan Shaghasi (1883–1929) who was declared Emir of Afghanistan twice in 1929 son of General Loinab Khushdil Khan, sometime Governor of Kabul and Kandahar, by his wife Sahira Begum, daughter of Amir al-Mumenin, Amir al-Kabir, Amir Dost Muhammad Khan, Amir of Afghanistan, by his wife, a daughter of Agha Muhammad Qizilbash was also Shaghasi Barakzai. Ali Ahmad's sister, the Ulya Mukhadara Zarin Jan Begum was the mother of Humaira Begum who was the Queen consort of Afghanistan.

== Distribution ==
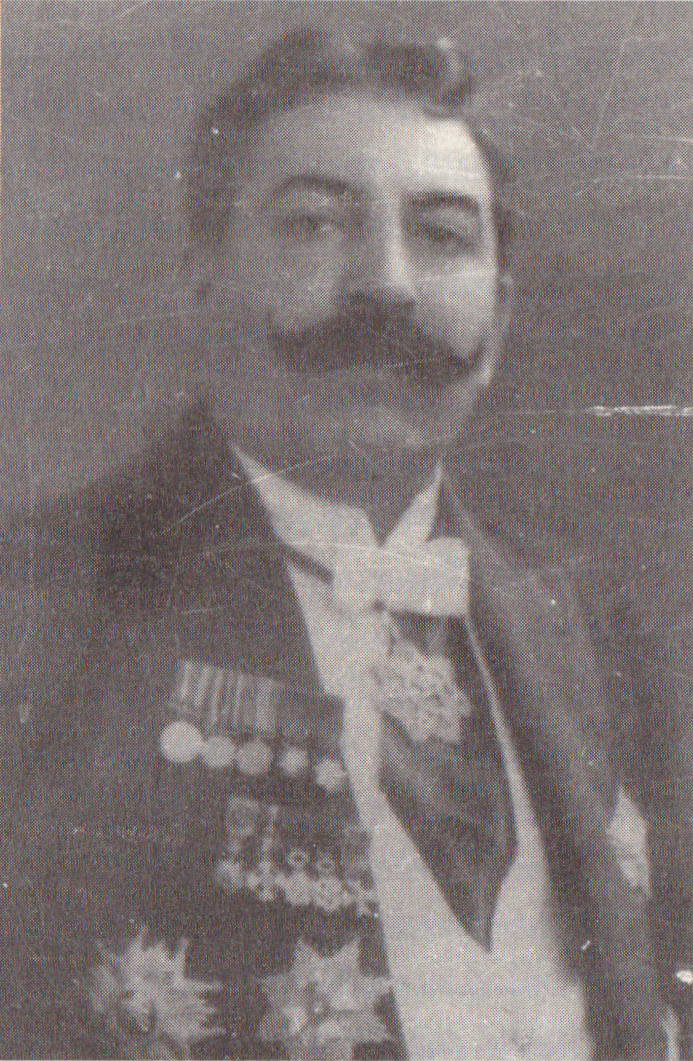
Ali Ahmad Khan Shaghasi (1883–1929) who was declared Emir of Afghanistan twice in 1929.

Shaghasi Khel are descendants of Mirdaad Khan Barakzai, Işik Aqasi (Minister of the Royal Court "Chemberlain") during the reign of the Kandahari Sardars (Dost Muhammad Khan's brothers), as well as the reign of Dost Muhammad Khan 1863 - 1866 and 1868 - 1879. His father, Bazar Khan Barakzai was a local Barakzai chief, and his grandfather was Sardar Yasin Khan Omar Khanzai (Barakzai), resident of Maruf District (at that time part of Arghistan District) of Kandahar, and one of the notable Sardars of Kandahar during the reigns of Timur Shah Durrani and brother to Muhammad of the Mohammadzai. The Shaghasi's were even more powerful than the Mohammadzai's during the ruling of Emir Sher Ali Khan - Emir of Afghanistan, and Emir Amanullah Khan - Emir of Afghanistan (February 28, 1919 – 1926), later King of Afghanistan (1926 - January 14, 1929). Prominent Afghan historian, Abdul Hai Habibi denotes that during King Amanullah Khan's reign, the former governor of Kabul was Mahmoud Khan Yawar and the later one was Ali Ahmad Khan (both Shaghasi) Barakzai. Abdul Aziz Khan (later Minister of war) and Mohammad Sarwar Khan were Naib -ul- Hukuma's (Shaghasi) Barakzai. In Mazar-e-Sharif and Herat, Mohammad Ibrahim Khan (later Minister) was also Khan Naib -ul- Hukuma, and Abdul Rahman and Nik Mohammad Khan were Firqa Meshar (all of them were Shaghasi) Barakzai. Dost Mahammad Khan Nazim (later Naib Salar, Sipah Salar, Dar-ul-Adalat, and Hakim-e-Ala) in Ghazni, Uruzgan and Kandahar was equally a (Shaghasi) Barakzai and Mohammad Alam Khan in Lugar and Kuchi and other governors were the same. To the Shaghasi Khel is related King Amanullah Khan's mother Queen Sarwar Sultana Begum, Siraj ul-Khwatin, the Aliya Hazrat (b. at Kabul, 1875; d. at Istanbul, Turkey, 1965), eldest daughter of Loinab Sher Dil Khan Shaghasi, by his third wife, Benazir Begum, a lady form the Popalzai clan.

== Language ==
The principal language of the Shaghasi is Pashto, more specifically the Southern (Kandahari) dialect of Pashto. Dari is also used as the language for records and correspondence.

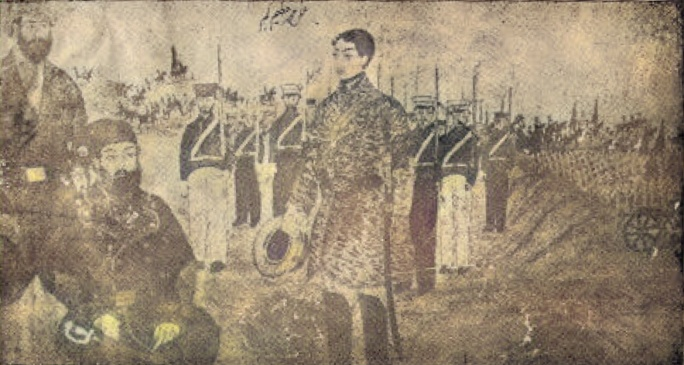
Governor of Kandahar, Sardar Aminullah Khan and his young son, Sardar Muhammad Ismail Khan and his chaimberlain, Sardar Amir Jan Khan Shaghasi behind him raising a revolt against the British in 1842.

== Politics ==
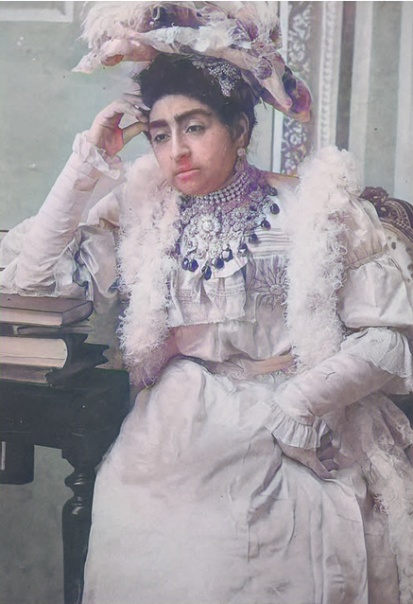
H. M. the Aliya Hazrat Queen Sarwar Sultana Shaghasi Serāj-ul-Khawātīn (Lamp of the Ladies), The first official queen consort of Afghanistan (1875 – 1965).

Prominent rulers of Afghanistan descending from the chiefs of the Barakzai tribe belonging to the Shaghasi, descendants of Sardar Yasin Khan Omar Khanzai (Barakzai), resident and one of the notable Sardars of Kandahar during the reigns of Timur Shah Durrani

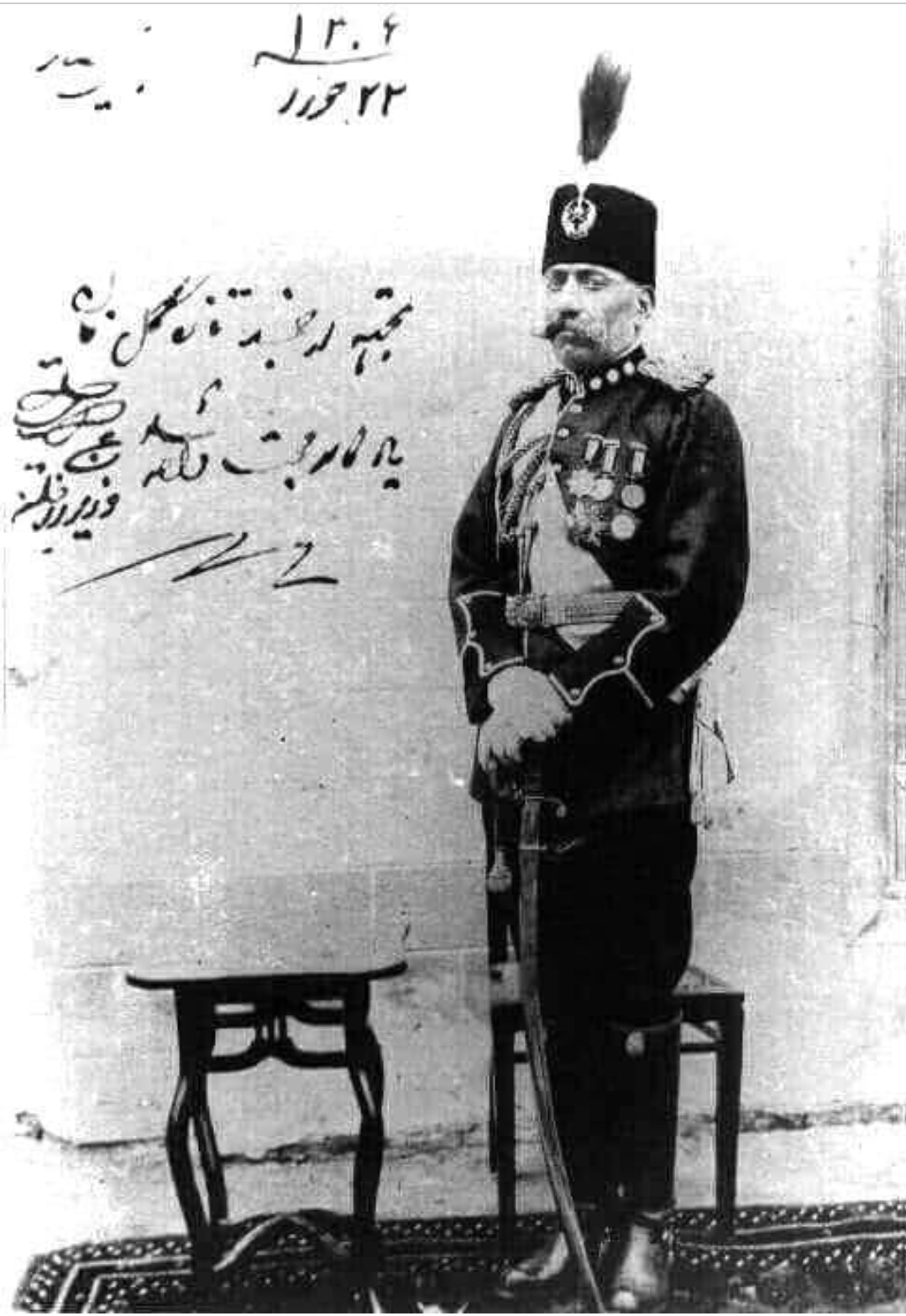
Field Marshal Wazir Abdul Aziz Khan Shaghasi. Minister of War and Minister of Interior Affairs under King Amanullah Khan.

- Sardar Mir Dad Khan Barakzai, Işik Aqasi (Minister of the Royal Court "Chemberlain") during the reign of the Kandahari Sardars (Dost Muhammad Khan's brothers), as well as the reign of Dost Muhammad Khan 1863 - 1866 and 1868 - 1879.
- H. M. the Aliya Hazrat Queen Sarwar Sultana Shaghasi Serāj-ul-Khawātīn (Lamp of the Ladies), the first queen consort of Afghanistan (1875 – 1965).
- Loinab Sher Dil Khan Shaghasi - Sardar-i-Wala (Regional General), Loinab ('great deputy,') and Minister to the Royal Court of Amir Dost Muhammad Khan Barakzai, and Amir Sher Ali Khan.
- Atta-u-llah Khan Shaghasi - Minister to the Royal Court of Amir Mohammad Yaqub Khan.
- Sardar Amir Jan Khan Shaghasi, the first Minister of Post (Muhtamim of Daak), and minister to the Royal Court of H.E. Sardar Muhammad Amin Khan, who raised the revolt against the British in 1842, governor of Kohistan 1842, and Kandahar 1863-1865.
- Muhammad Sarwar Khan Shaghasi - Sardar-i-Ala, Baba-i-Kiraam, and Minister to the Royal Court of Amir Abdur Rahman Khan.
- Dost Mohammad Khan Shaghasi - Naib Salar, Sepahsalar, Nazim-ull-Umor-ull-Adli, he was the first Minister of Justice in the history of Afghanistan when Amir Habibullah Khan established a Dar-ul-Adal "House of Justice (later Ministry of Justice)" and appointed Dost Mohammad Khan as the first minister for it. Dost Mohammad Khan Shaghasi was also Minister to the Royal Court of Amir Habibullah Khan before his appointment as the Minister of Justice.
- Yawar Mahmud Khan Shaghasi - Minister to the Royal Court of Amir Amanullah Khan.
- Abdul Habib Khan Shaghasi - Minister of Education to Amir Amanullah Khan, and Minister to the Royal Court of King Inayatullah Khan (January 14, 1929 - January 17, 1929).
- Sergeant Mohammad Omar Khan - A close confidant to Amir Amanullah Khan, a military sergeant during the war of independence in Afghanistan under his uncle, Dost Mohammad Khan Shaghasi's command and a lieutenant under Ali Ahmad Khan during a revolt in Eastern Afghanistan.
- Amir Ali Ahmad Khan (January 19, 1929 - February 19, 1929) (June 23, 1929 - July 3, 1929).
- Sarwar Sultana Shaghasi - Qween Consort of Amir Habibullah Khan, and mother of Amir Amanullah Khan.

== See also ==
- Pashtun tribes
- Barakzai dynasty
- Barakzai
- Mohammadzai
- Pashtunwali
- Pashtunistan
- Pakthas
