= Princess India of Afghanistan =

Afghan royal (1929–2023)

Princess India
- Born: 7 June 1929; Bombay, Bombay Presidency, British India
- Died: 13 October 2023 (aged 94); Rome, Italy
- Spouse: Kazem Agha Malek (m. 1951; div. 1956) Dr. Abdul Rauf Haider (m. 1966)
- Issue: Soraya Malek; Hamdam Malek; Iskandar Rauf Haider
Names
- Hindia Multan Begum
- House: Mohammadzai-Tarzi
- Father: Amanullah Khan
- Mother: Soraya Tarzi

Princess India of Afghanistan (Pashto: شهزادۍ انډیا Shahzadaye India, Italian: Principessa India d'Afghanistan; 7 June 1929 – 13 October 2023) was an Afghan royal. She was the youngest daughter of Emeritus King of Afghanistan Amanullah Khan and Queen consort Soraya Tarzi. She held the title of princess of the royal house of Mohammadzai-Tarzi.

Princess India was born in Bombay, British India, five months after her father's abdication on 14 January 1929 and named in honor of the country they fled to exile. After an invitation by Queen Elena of Italy, the family eventually settled in Rome, where the princess grew up and continued to make her home.

India was educated at Pension Marie-José, Gstaad, Switzerland, and Pontifical Gregorian University, Rome, Italy.

India visited Afghanistan for the first time in 1968, and started charity work for Afghan children seeking aid.

In the 2000s, Princess India formed the Mahmud Tarzi Cultural Foundation (MTCF) in Kabul, where she served as vice chairman as of 2010. In 2006, Princess India was appointed Cultural Ambassador to Europe by the Afghan President, Hamid Karzai. She spent her time between Rome and Kabul before the Taliban takeover of 2021 and held lectures at conferences throughout Europe.

In August 2019, Princess India was invited by the Afghan government to take part in the state's celebrations for Afghanistan's 100th anniversary of independence.

== Personal life ==
Princess India was married twice and had two daughters (from the first marriage) and a son (from the second marriage).

Princess India thought of her mother as a positive figure in contemporary Afghanistan, calling her achievements "highly regarded by Afghans", and adding her speeches of "how she encouraged Afghan women to become independent, to learn how to read and write." Regarding women's rights in Afghanistan, India thought that more education is needed for Afghan men to improve the situation. She also said of the burqa that it is "not an Afghan garment and is not even an Islamic garment".

In September 2011, Princess India of Afghanistan was honored by the Afghan-American Women Association for her work in women's rights. In 2012, Radio Azadi named her "Person of the Year" for her humanitarian work.

Princess India of Afghanistan died on 13 October 2023, at the age of 94. One year after in September 2024 in Italy is published '''il bambino che danzava con le farfalle'' a novel based in Afghanistan and dedicated

Italian writer Demetrio Baffa Trasci Amalfitani with Princess India of Afghanistan who he dedicated his novel about Afghanistan.

to Princess India by her friend and italian writer Demetrio Baffa Trasci Amalfitani di Crucoli and novel won the literary price "Valerio Gentile".

== See also ==
- Nancy Dupree
