= Asma Rasmya =

Afghan feminist

- أسماء رسمية
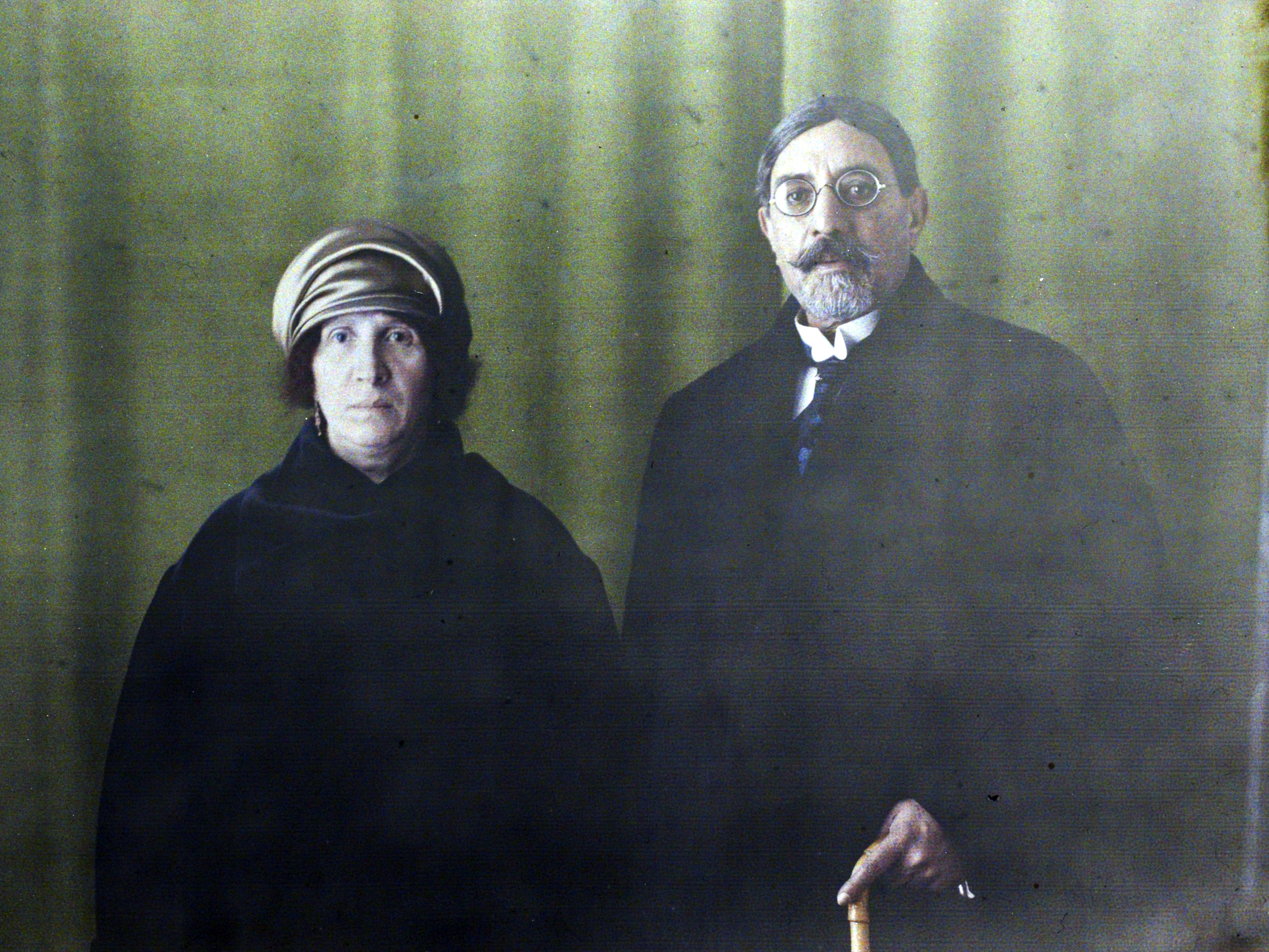
- Born: 1877; Damascus, Ottoman Syria, Ottoman Empire
- Died: 1945 (aged 67–68)
- Citizenship: Afghanistan
- Spouse: Mahmud Tarzi (m. 1891; died 1933)
- Children: Soraya Tarzi
- Father: Saleh Mossadiah El-Fattal

Asma Rasmya (Pashto: اسماء رسمیه) or Asma Rasmiya Khanum (1877 –1945), was an Afghan editor, school principal and feminist. She has been referred to as the first female managing editor as well as the first female principal in Afghanistan. She was the mother of queen Soraya Tarzi and the mother-in-law of king Amanullah Khan (r. 1919–1929).

== Life ==
She was born in Damascus in Ottoman Syria. She was the daughter of Saleh Mossadiah El-Fattal, a muezzin of the Umayyad mosque and a Circassian mother. In 1891, she married the Afghan politician and editor Mahmud Tarzi. She moved to Afghanistan in 1901. Afghanistan was at this point very conservative, while she was more liberal in her outlook. She was also more open to a Western approach, having been raised in the Ottoman Empire after the Tanzimat reforms. For instance, she was noted for often wearing Western fashions.

In 1913, her daughter Soraya married the future king. When he succeeded to the throne in 1919, Asma's son-in-law, King Amanullah, started a radical modernization reform program. This included a reform of the position of women, and the women of the royal family, notably her daughter Queen Soraya, were to act as role models for the new modern Afghan woman. The reforms were supported by Mahmud Tarzi and Asma Rasmya, and Asma Rasmya and the women of her family, notably her nieces Bilqis Afiza and Ruh Afiza, were to participate actively in these reforms.

Her spouse was a pioneer of journalism in Afghanistan, and Asma Rasmya became the managing editor of the first women's magazine in Afghanistan, Irshad-e Naswan, which was published from 17 March 1922. She was the co-editor of the magazine with her niece Ruh Afza, sister of Habibullah Tarzi, and her daughter queen Soraya also contributed to the magazine. As editor, she was the first woman in journalism in Afghanistan.

She was also appointed principal of one of the girls schools which was founded by her daughter: Maktab-i Masturat, the first girls' school in Afghanistan. She was thereby also the first woman to be principal in Afghanistan.

In 1929, however, her son-in-law was deposed and exiled with her daughter, and all their reforms were reverted.
