= Nafeesa Shayeq =

Afghan magazine editor and feminist (fl. 1970s)

Nafeesa Shayeq was an Afghan feminist. She belonged to the generation of pioneer women who attained public positions in Afghan society after the reforms of Mohammed Daoud Khan.

She was the first editor of Mirmon (i.e. woman) magazine of the Women's Welfare Association. She served as the Director Ceneral of Publicity and Promotion for that same Institute from 1976 to 1978, as well as Director of Women's Welfare at the Rural Development Center.
