= Contraceptive use in Bangladesh =

In Bangladesh, an estimated 60% of married women currently use a method of contraception.

Quantification of profound developments regarding the prevalence of contraception can be achieved by looking at the contraceptive prevalence rate (CPR). It takes into account all sources of supply and all contraceptive methods. In less than forty years, the CPR increased from 8% in 1975 to 62% in 2014. However, fertility is note solely dependent on contraceptive use, but also on use-effectiveness and user adherence. Despite the increased prevalence of contraceptives, unplanned pregnancies are still a major concern with married women having 0.7 more children they desired.

== Family planning ==
Currently, the desired family size for women in Bangladesh is 2.2 children, which has slightly decreased from 2.4 children over the past decade. Of all pregnancies, 74% were wanted or intended, while 26% were unintended. This includes 15% that were mistimed and 11% that were unwanted. The pregnancy intention status is significantly associated with pregnancy order, age, religion, use of contraceptive methods and the wealth index. A study found that the discrepancy between actual fertility rate and desired fertility rate mostly originates from the preference for male children, security against infant and child mortality, a lack of quality family planning services and ineffective use of contraceptive methods. Fertility was the highest for women without sons, while decreasing with the increase in number of sons. Women with a higher proportion of sons are also more likely to use contraceptive methods explaining the decrease in fertility.

Visits by a family planning worker (FPW) within the previous six months had the biggest impact on contraceptive use. Education level (adjusted) and number of children who are alive were also positively associated with contraceptive use. Contraceptive use was lower among Muslims, living in rural areas and Sylhet Division.

== Contraceptive methods ==
A 2014 report found that the pill remains the most widely used contraceptive method (27%) followed by injectables (12%), condoms (6%) and female sterilization (5%). The use of long-acting reversible contraceptives (LARC) peaked at 30% in 1991 but declined ever since to reach 8% in 2007. These methods include the use of implants or intrauterine devices (IUDs) as well as permanent methods like female or male sterilization. Usage rates of male sterilization, despite being much cheaper than female sterilization, remain very low at only 1%. Knowledge on emergency contraceptive pills among married women was found to be very low. Reportedly, only 14% ever heard of it.

Discontinuation or switching of the contraceptive method can be attributed to various reasons. These include the desire to become pregnant (31%), undesired side effects (26%) and accidental pregnancies (14%). Depending on the employed method, the reasons for discontinuation or switching varied. When contraception was discontinues, the occurrence of side effect was particularly pronounced for IUDs (47%), injectables (45%) and implants.
