= Slavery in Afghanistan =

Slavery in Afghanistan was first documented as an accepted practice in the post-Classical history of Afghanistan, continuing during the Middle Ages and after, until being banned by the Emirate of Afghanistan in 1923, though persisting after then in illegal forms. State sanctioned practices akin to slavery of women and girls are widely documented, without being officially designated as such. The origin of the enslaved people in Afghanistan shifted during different periods, and slaves in Afghanistan never had any particular ethnicity. An illegal form of sexual slavery of young boys called bacha bāzī continues into the present day and is sometimes perpetrated by Taliban members, despite being condemned and prohibited by Taliban leadership.

== History ==
Prior to the Durrani Empire (1747–1823), Afghanistan often belonged to other larger states, primarily Persia. The history of the institution of Afghanistan is thus represented by the history of slavery in bigger states.

=== Slave trade ===
After the Islamic conquest of Persia, regions of both Persia and Afghanistan that had not converted to Islam were considered infidel regions, and as a result, they were considered legitimate targets of slave raids that were launched from regions whose populations had converted to Islam: for example Daylam in northwestern Iran and the mountainous region of Ḡūr in central Afghanistan were both exposed to slave raids which were launched from Muslim regions.

It was considered legitimate to enslave war captives; during the Afghan occupation of Persia (1722–1730), for example, thousands of people were enslaved, and the Baloch made regular incursions into Southeastern Iran for the purpose of capturing people and turning them into slaves. The slave traffic in Afghanistan was particularly active in the northwest, where 400 to 500 were sold annually.

According to a report of an expedition to Afghanistan published in London in 1871:

The country generally between Caubul (Kabul) and the Oxus appears to be in a very lawless state; slavery is as rife as ever, and extends through Hazara, Badakshan, Wakhan, Sirikul, Kunjūt (Hunza), &c. A slave, if a strong man likely to stand work well, is, in Upper Badakshan, considered to be of the same value as one of the large dogs of the country, or of a horse, being about the equivalent of Rs 80. A slave girl is valued at from four horses or more, according to her looks &c.; men are, however, almost always exchanged for dogs. When I was in Little Tibet (Ladakh), a returned slave who had been in the Kashmir army took refuge in my camp; he said he was well enough treated as to food &c., but he could never get over having been exchanged for a dog, and constantly harped on the subject, the man who sold him evidently thinking the dog the better animal of the two. In Lower Badakshan, and more distant places, the price of slaves is much enhanced, and payment is made in coin.

In response to the Hazara uprising of 1892, the Afghan Emir Abdur Rahman Khan declared a "Jihad" against the Shiites. His large army defeated the rebellion at its center, in Oruzgan, by 1892 and the local population was being massacred. According to S. A. Mousavi, "thousands of Hazara men, women, and children were sold as slaves in the markets of Kabul and Qandahar, while numerous towers of human heads were made from the defeated rebels as a warning to others who might challenge the rule of the Amir".

In Southern Iran, poor parents sold their children into slavery, and as late as around 1900, slave raids were conducted by chieftains in south Iran.

=== Slave market ===
The markets for captives from South Iran were often in Arabia and Afghanistan; "most of the slave girls employed as domestics in the houses of the gentry at Kandahar were brought from the outlying districts of Ghayn".

Most slaves were employed as agricultural laborers, domestic slaves and sexual slaves, while other slaves served in administrative positions. Slaves in Afghanistan possessed some social mobility, especially those slaves who were owned by the government. Slavery was more common in towns and cities, because some Afghan tribal communities did not readily engage in the slave trade; according to some sources, the decentralized nature of Afghan tribes forced more urbanized areas to import slaves to fill labor shortages. Most slaves in Afghanistan had been imported from Persia and Central Asia.

The British doctor John Alfred Gray a personal physician to Amir Abdul Rehman Khan, described:

Recently in Kabul it was very common sight to see a gang of Hazara women with their unveiled faces and their dingy dresses ragged and dirty conducted through the town by a small guard of soldiers with bayonets fixed. As the war progressed, they became so plentiful that His Highness would often reward a faithful servant or officer by presenting him with one or more as an addition to his Harem.

Segments of the Hazara people were still living in slavery and sold in the slave market of Kabul as late as in the early 20th century.

==== Royal harem ====
The rulers of Afghanistan customarily had a harem of four official wives as well as a large number of unofficial wives for the sake of tribal marriage diplomacy,. In addition, they also had enslaved harem women known as kaniz (“slave girl”) and surati or surriyat ("mistress" or "concubine"), guarded by the ghulam bacha (eunuchs). Habibullah Khan (r. 1901–1919) famously had at least 44 wives and hundreds of slave women (mostly Hazara) in his harem in the Harem Sara Palace, which was claimed to house about one hundred women. One sources number Habibullah Khan (r. 1901–1919) as having approximately fifty offspring with four wives and about thirty-five concubines, in his harem in the Harem Sara Palace. The women of the royal harem dressed in Western fashion as far back as the reign Habibullah Khan, but did not show themselves other than completely covered outside of the enclosed area of the royal palace.

The royal harem was first abolished by king Amanullah Khan, who in 1923 freed all slaves of the royal harem as well as encouraging his wife, queen Soraya Tarzi, and the other women of the royal family to unveil and live public lives. While the royal women returned to the purdah of the royal complex after the deposition of Amanullah in 1929, it was dissolved with the final unveiling of the royal women in 1959.

== Abolition ==
Legal chattel slavery was abolished in Afghanistan by king Amanullah Khan in 1923. King Amanullah Khan was known as a big reformer, and introduced a number of societal reforms in Afghanistan during his reign as part of his controversial modernization program. By the time of the official abolition of slavery in 1923, there were about 700 enslaved people in Kabul, called begar or impressed labor. Slaves under the age of twelve were sold for a price of 50 rupees and slaves over twelve cost 30 rupees; most wealthy families had at least one or two slaves, and it was common to exchange them as gifts. Male slaves were often referred to as ghulam, and female as either kaniz (domestic maidservants) or surriyat (referring to concubines). When Amanullah Khan banned slavery in the 1920s, many of the slaves at the time of the abolition were of Hazara origin.

Amanullah Khan banned slavery in Afghanistan in the 1923 Constitution, but the practice carried on unofficially for many more years. The Swede Aurora Nilsson, who lived in Kabul in 1926–1927, described the occurrence of slavery in Kabul in her memoirs, as well as how a German woman, the widow of an Afridi man named Abdullah Khan, who had fled to the city with her children from her late husband's successor, was sold at public auction and obtained her freedom by being bought by the German diplomatic mission for 7,000 marks.

== Modern slavery ==
In the first Taliban government, one of the atrocities committed by the Taliban was the enslavement of the Afghan women for use as concubines. In 1998, eyewitnesses in Mazar-i-Sharif reported that hundreds of Shia Hazara girls had been abducted by Taliban fighters during the massacre. One source suggests that up to 400 Afghan women were involved.

An illegal form of sexual slavery of young boys called bacha bāzī in which men exploit adolescent boys for entertainment and/or sexual abuse continues into the present day, under all modern Afghan governments, despite being outlawed by political leadership, including that of the Taliban. Despite the Taliban ban, some Taliban members have been documented as perpetrators.

=== Confusion over 2026 Taliban penal code ===
After Supreme Leader Hibatullah Akhundzada enacted a new penal sentencing code in January 2026, some foreign publications alleged that it either "legalized" or "marked the legal acceptance" of slavery implicitly through the use of the term ghulam, which can be translated as "slave" but has other readings, including being a servant or dependent. Some reports also claimed that a class hierarchy in the document would be used to decide criminal convictions. However, the penal code focused on sentencing, and referenced several class factors, such as being ghulam, as factors judges are reminded to take into account when deciding sentences to apply to convicts.

== See also ==
- Bukhara slave trade
- Khivan slave trade
- Slavery in Iran
- History of slavery in the Muslim world
- History of concubinage in the Muslim world
- Slavery in Saudi Arabia
- Slavery in Oman
