= Soraya Tarzi =

First queen consort of Afghanistan (1899–1968)

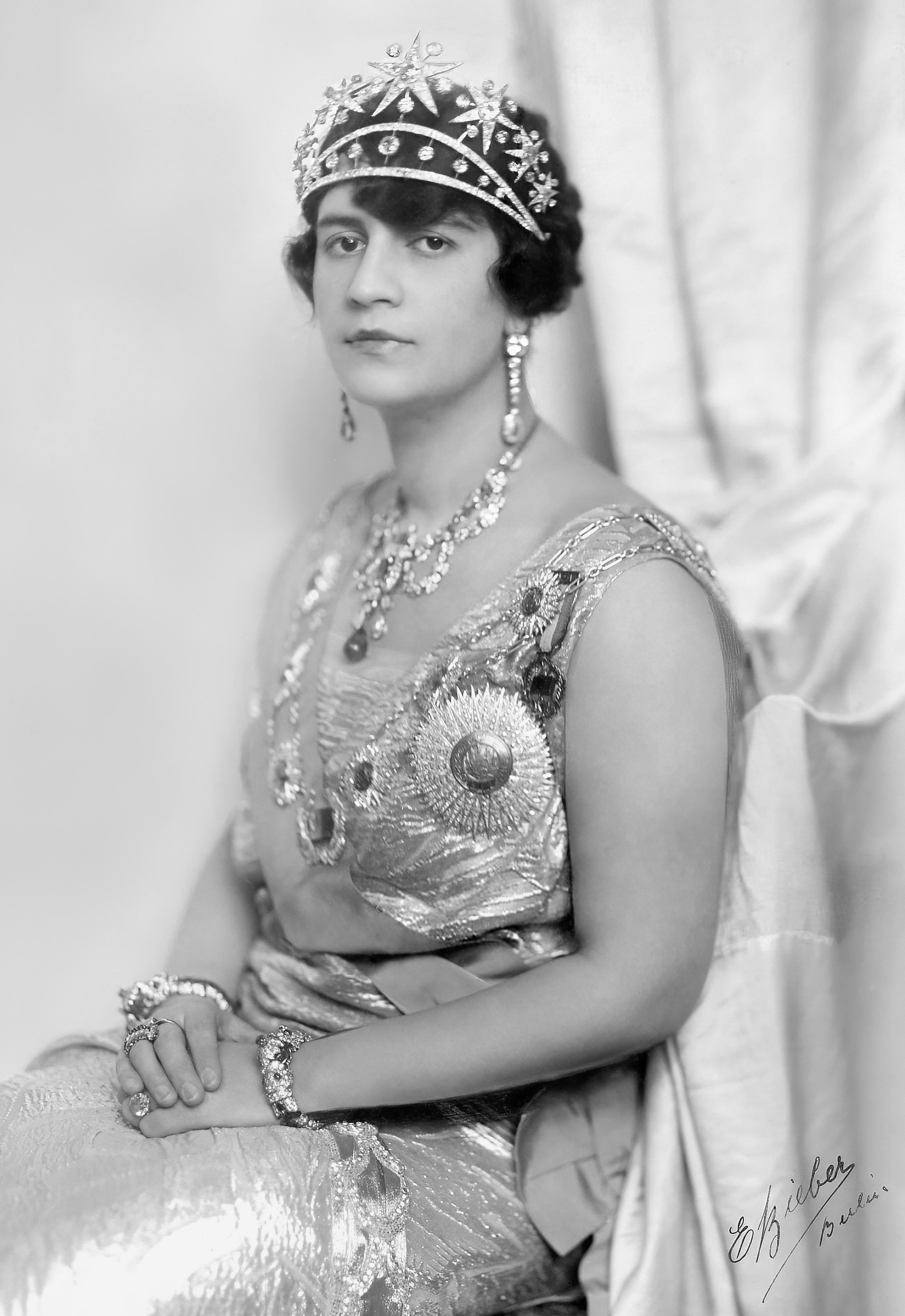
- Formal photograph of Soraya during her tenure as princess consort of Afghanistan

Queen consort of Afghanistan
- Tenure: 9 June 1926 – 14 January 1929

Princess consort of Afghanistan
- Tenure: 28 February 1919 – 9 June 1926
- Born: Suraiya Shahzada Tarzi; 24 November 1897; Damascus, Ottoman Syria, Ottoman Empire
- Died: 20 April 1968 (aged 70); Rome, Italy
- Burial: Jalalabad, Afghanistan
- Spouse: Amanullah Khan
- Issue: See: Princess Ameenah Shah Princess Abedah Bibi Princess Meliha Crown Prince Rahmatullah of Afghanistan Prince Saifullah Prince Hymayatullah Princess Adeela Prince Ehsanullah Princess India Princess Nagia
- House: Mohammadzai-Tarzi
- Father: Sardar Mahmud Beg Tarzi
- Mother: Asma Rasmiya Khanum
- Religion: Islam

Soraya Tarzi (Pashto: ثريا طرزی) (24 November 1897 – 20 April 1968) was Queen of Afghanistan as the wife of King Amanullah Khan. As Queen, she became one of the most influential women in the world at the time. She played a major part in the modernization reforms of Amanullah Khan, particularly regarding the emancipation of women.

Owing to the reforms King Amanullah instituted, the country's religious sects grew violent. In 1929, the King abdicated to prevent a civil war and went into exile. Their first stop was India, then part of the British Empire.

== Early life and family background ==
Suraiya Shahzada Tarzi was born on 24 November 1899, in Damascus, Syria, then part of the Ottoman Empire. She was the daughter of the Afghan political figure Sardar Mahmud Beg Tarzi, and granddaughter of Sardar Ghulam Muhammad Tarzi. She belonged to the Mohammadzai Pashtun tribe, a sub-tribe of the Barakzai dynasty.

She studied in Syria, learning Western and modern values, which would influence her future actions and beliefs. Her mother was the Syrian feminist Asma Rasmya, her father's second wife, and daughter of Sheikh Muhammad Saleh al-Fattal Effendi, of Aleppo, Muezzin of the Umayyad Mosque.

Upon her family's return to Afghanistan, Soraya Tarzi would meet and marry then prince Amanullah.

== Marriage ==
After the Tarzis returned to Afghanistan, they were received at Court as wished by the Emir Habibullah Khan. This is where Soraya Tarzi met Habibullah's son Prince Amanullah, a sympathiser of Mahmud Tarzi's liberal ideas. Amanullah and Tarzi struck an affinity, chose to marry and married on 30 August 1913 at Qawm-i-Bagh Palace in Kabul. Amanullah's older half-brother Inayatullah Khan also married Tarzi's sister Khariya Tarzi.

When she married into the royal family Tarzi grew to be one of the region's most important figures. Tarzi was the future King Amanullah's only wife, which broke centuries of tradition. They both actively denounced polygamy. Amanullah was to dissolve the royal harem when he succeeded to the throne and free the enslaved women of the harem.

Amanullah and Soraya had ten children, four sons and six daughters:

- Princess Ameenah Shah (14 May 1916 – 29 October 1992). During her exile, in 1954 she married a naturalised Turkish citizen of Bosnian origin named Mustafa Hasanovic Ar. He was the son of the deputy of the Bosnian Young Muslims.
- Princess Abedah. She married firstly Ali Wali, son of Muhammad Wali and had one son. She married secondly to Hamidullah Enayat Seraj, son of Sardar Enayatullah.
  - Ikhlil
- Princess Meliha (1920–2011). She became a medical doctor in Istanbul University, and married Turkish engineer A. Tahir Söker, a close relative of Celâl Bayar.
- Crown Prince Rahmatullah of Afghanistan (7 June 1921 – 11 September 2009). He married Adelia Graziani, a niece of an Italian general Rodolfo Graziani.
- Prince Saifullah died young from cholera.
- Prince Hymayatullah died very young from bronchial pneumonia.
- Princess Adeela (1925–2000) married Armando Angelini (b. August 10, 1924), the son of an Italian cavalry officer and they had four daughters:
  - Elisabetta (b. 31 May 1948)
  - Cristina (b. 3 Oct 1949)
  - Simin (b. 8 Oct 1954)
  - Cinzia (b. 11 Jan 1957)
- Prince Ehsanullah (1926–2017) married Leyla Tarzi, daughter of Col. Tavvab Tarzi, son of Mahmud Tarzi. They had 2 sons, both born in Istanbul:
  - Ahmed Aman Ullah (b. 1961), married Sylvie Théobald (b. at Bourges, France)
  - Rahmad Ullah (b. 1965), married Carine Berger, of Bernex, Switzerland.
- Princess India (1929–2023), in 1951 she married Kazem Malek, an Iranian landowner, and settled in Mashhad, Iran. They had two daughters: Soraya, born in 1954 in Rome, Italy, and Hamdam, born in Mashad, Iran in 1956. After eight years of marriage Princess India divorced her husband and returned to Rome to live with her two daughters. In 1966 she married an Afghan businessman, Abdul Rauf Haider. They had a son named Eskandar who was born in Rome in 1967. In 1968, Princess India returned to Afghanistan after the death of her mother Queen Soraya. She attended funeral ceremonies in Jalalabad and was very much impressed by her homeland and decided from that time on she would work for the benefit of Afghanistan.
  - Soraya (b. 1954), first daughter of Princess India
  - Haman (b. 1956), second daughter of Princess India and her husband Kazem Malek. Haman later married an Italian naval commander, Paolo Fusarini. The couple had two children, Matteo and Flavia.
  - Eskandar (b. 1967), son of Princess India and Abdul Rauf Haider.
- Princess Nagia, the youngest daughter of Amanullah and Soraya. She married İlter Doğan, a Turkish businessman whom she met on her visit to Istanbul. They have two children.
  - Ömer, son of Princess Nagia and İlter Doğan
  - Hümeyra, daughter of Princess Nagia and İlter Doğan

== Queen of Afghanistan ==
When the prince became Amir in 1919 and King in 1926, the Queen played an important role in the evolution of the country. When Amanullah was enthroned in June 1926, she was enthroned alongside him in front of a completely shaved and non-turbaned audience. Queen Soraya was also the first Muslim consort who appeared in public together with her husband, something which was unheard of at the time. She participated with him in the hunting parties, riding on horseback, and in some Cabinet meetings.

=== Women's rights ===
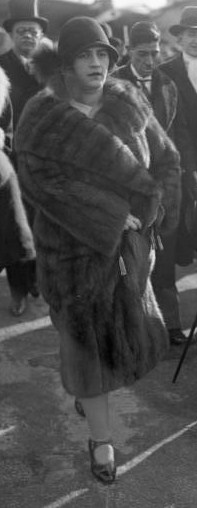
Queen Soraya in Berlin in 1928

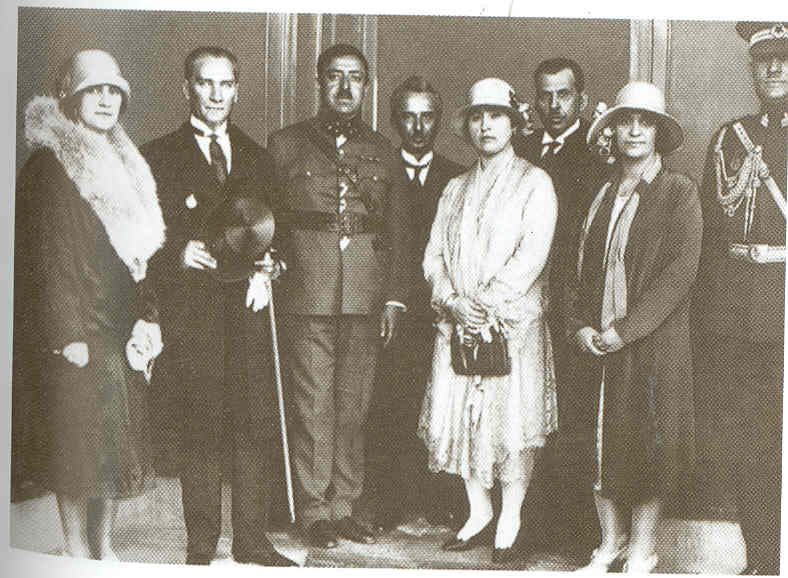
Queen Soraya Tarzi and King Amanullah with President Kemal Atatürk

The emancipation of women was a part of Amanullah's reform policy, and the women of the royal family, particularly his wife and sisters, acted as the role models of this change. Many women from Amanullah's family publicly participated in organizations and went on to become government officials later in life. In 1926, she said that:

“Do not think… that our nation needs only men to serve it. Women should also take their part as women did in the early years of Islam. The valuable services rendered by women are recounted throughout history, from which we learn that women were not created solely for pleasure and comfort. From their examples, we learn that we must all contribute toward the development of our nation and that this can not be done without being equipped with knowledge.”

In 1921, Tarzi founded and contributed to the first magazine for women, Ishadul Naswan (Guidance for Women), which was edited by her mother, as well as the first women's organisation, Anjuman-i Himayat-i-Niswan, which promoted women's welfare and had an office to which women could report mistreatment by their husbands, brothers, and fathers. She founded a theatre in Paghman which, although segregated for women, still gave women an opportunity to find their own social scene and break the harem seclusion.

King Amanullah said, "I am your King, but the Minister of Education is my wife — your Queen". Queen Soraya encouraged women to get education and opened the first primary school for girls in Kabul, the Masturat School (later the Ismat Malalai School), in 1921, as well as the first hospital for women, the Masturat Hospital, in 1924. In 1926, on the anniversary of independence from the British, Soraya gave a public speech:

"It (Independence) belongs to all of us and that is why we celebrate it. Do you think, however, that our nation from the outset needs only men to serve it? Women should also take their part as women did in the early years of our nation and Islam. From their examples we must learn that we must all contribute toward the development of our nation and that this cannot be done without being equipped with knowledge. So we should all attempt to acquire as much knowledge as possible, in order that we may render our services to society in the manner of the women of early Islam."

She sent 15 young women to Turkey for higher education in 1928. These fifteen were all graduates of the Masturat middle school she had founded, mainly daughters of the royal family and government officials.

The Swedish memoir writer Rora Asim Khan, who lived in Afghanistan with her Afghan husband in 1926–1927, describe in her memoirs how she was invited to the Queen at Paghman and Darullaman to describe Western life style and fashion to the Queen and the king's mother. She noted that the Queen had many questions, since she was soon due to visit Europe.

In 1927–1928, Soraya and her husband visited Europe. They were the first heads of state to visit to visit Germany since its defeat in World War I, and met with Pope Pius XI, leader of the Catholic Church. In 1928, the King and Queen were in England where they received honorary degrees from Oxford University, being seen as both promoters of enlightened Western values, and ruling an important buffer state, located between the British Indian Empire and the Soviet Union. The Queen spoke to a large group of students and leaders in Oxford. Despite this, the British did not have a good relationship with Tarzi's family as a whole, for the chief representative of Afghanistan that they had to deal with was her father.

The unveiling of women was a controversial part of the reform policy. Women of the royal family already wore Western fashion before the accession of Amanullah, but they did so only within the enclosed royal palace complex and always covered themselves in a veil when leaving the royal area. During an interview, Tarzi shared her view that purdah, the seclusion and veiling of women, was an un-Islamic Abbasid-era innovation.

On August 29, 1928, Amanullah held a Loya Jirgah, a Grand Assembly of Tribal Elders, to endorse his development programmes, and to which the 1,100 delegates were required to wear European clothes provided for them by the state. Amanullah argued for women's rights to education and equality and publicly removed her veil during a speech she gave at the meeting. Her daughters and women from the Kabul elite also unveiled themselves in public. In Kabul, this policy was also endorsed by reserving certain streets for men and women dressed in modern Western clothing. Conservatives objected to the unveiling of women and her actions incited anger, but they did not say so openly at the meeting. Instead they began to mobilize public opinion after their return from the meeting.

In 1929, the King and Queen visited Iran at the invitation of Reza Shah. Tarzi did not wear a hijab for the visit, which inspired the Shah to begin introducing similar reforms in Iran.

== Final years in exile ==
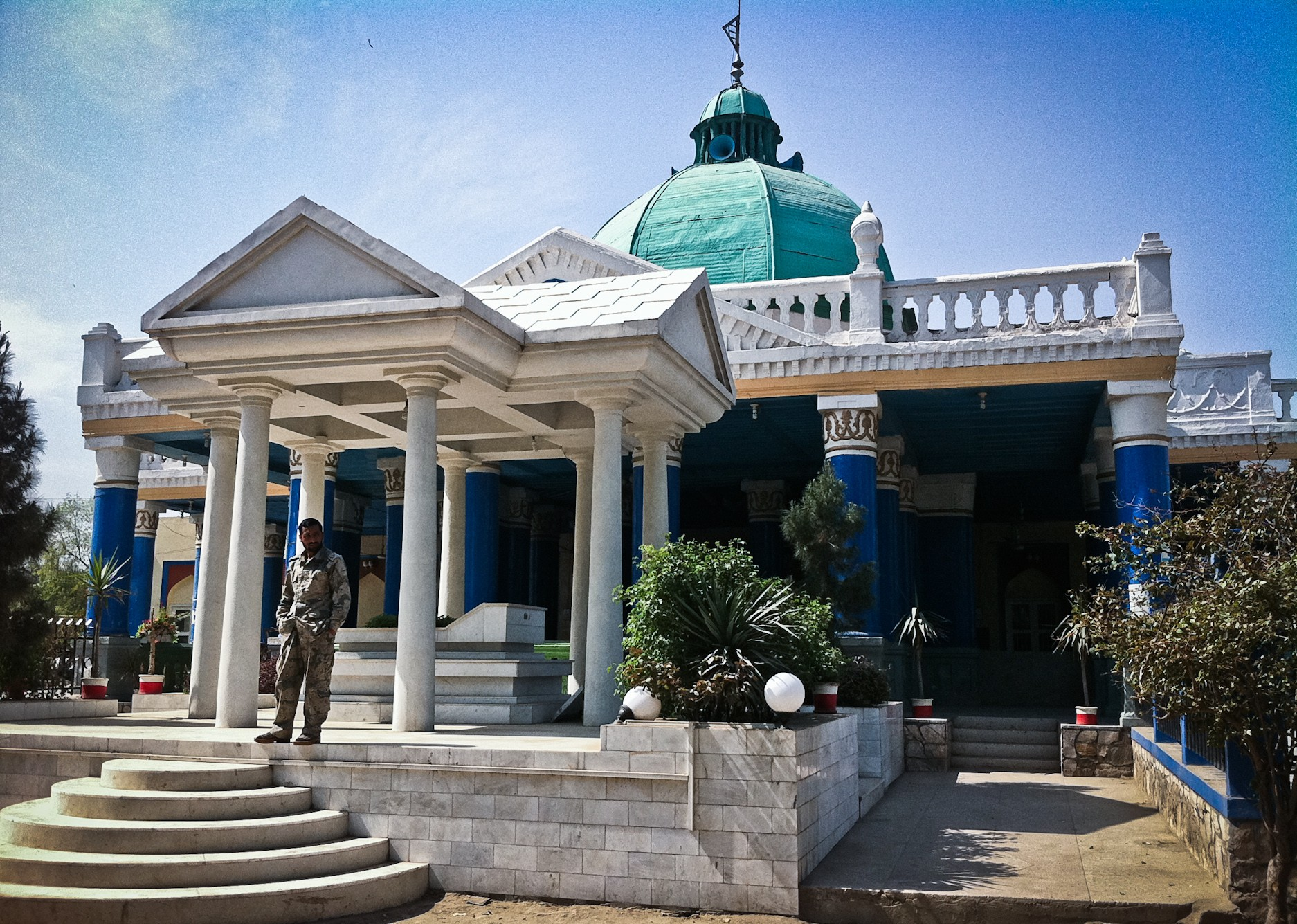
Queen Soraya and her husband King Amanullah are buried at this mausoleum in Jalalabad, Afghanistan

In 1929, the King abdicated in order to prevent a civil war and went into exile.

Queen Soraya and her family firstly fled to India, where she gave birth to a daughter on 7 June 1929 that they would name Princess India after their adopted country. The family next lived in exile in Rome, Italy, having been invited there.

Not much is known about their life in exile. The New York Times reported that the royal couple converted to Catholicism, but this was later found to be false.

== Death and legacy ==
Tarzi died on 20 April 1968 in Rome. The funeral was escorted by the Italian military team to the Rome airport, before being taken to Afghanistan where a solemn state funeral was held. She is buried in Bagh-e Amir Shaheed, the family mausoleum in a large marble plaza, covered by a dome roof held up by blue columns in the heart of Jalalabad, next to her husband the King, who had died eight years earlier.

Her youngest daughter, Princess India of Afghanistan, visited Afghanistan in the 2000s, setting up various charity projects. Princess India was also an honorary cultural ambassador of Afghanistan to Europe. In September 2011, Princess India of Afghanistan was honored by the Afghan-American Women Association for her work in women's rights.

== Honours ==
National honour

- Grand Collar of the Order of the Supreme Sun.

Foreign honors

- Decoration of al-Kemal in brilliants (Kingdom of Egypt, 26 December 1927).
- Honorary Dame Grand Cross of the Order of the British Empire (United Kingdom, 13 March 1928).
- In 2019 Time created 89 new covers to celebrate women of the year starting from 1920; it chose Tarzi for 1927.

== Ancestry ==
Ancestors of Soraya Tarzi

16. Sardar Payinda Muhammad Khan
8. Sardar Rahim Dil Khan
17. a lady from the Hotak Ghilzai tribe
4. Sardar Haji Ghulam Muhammad Khan
18. Sardar Rahim Dad Khan
9. Hawa Begum
2. Sardar Mahmud Beg Tarzi
20. Prince Sultan Durrani
10. Prince Maudad Durrani
5. Sultanat Begum
1. Soraya Tarzi
6. Sheikh Muhammad Saleh al-Fattal Effendi
3. Asma Rasmiya Khanum

Royal titles
Preceded by —	Queen consort of Afghanistan; 1926–1929	Succeeded by Mah Parwar Begum
