= Purdah =

Seclusion of women in some Muslim and Hindu communities

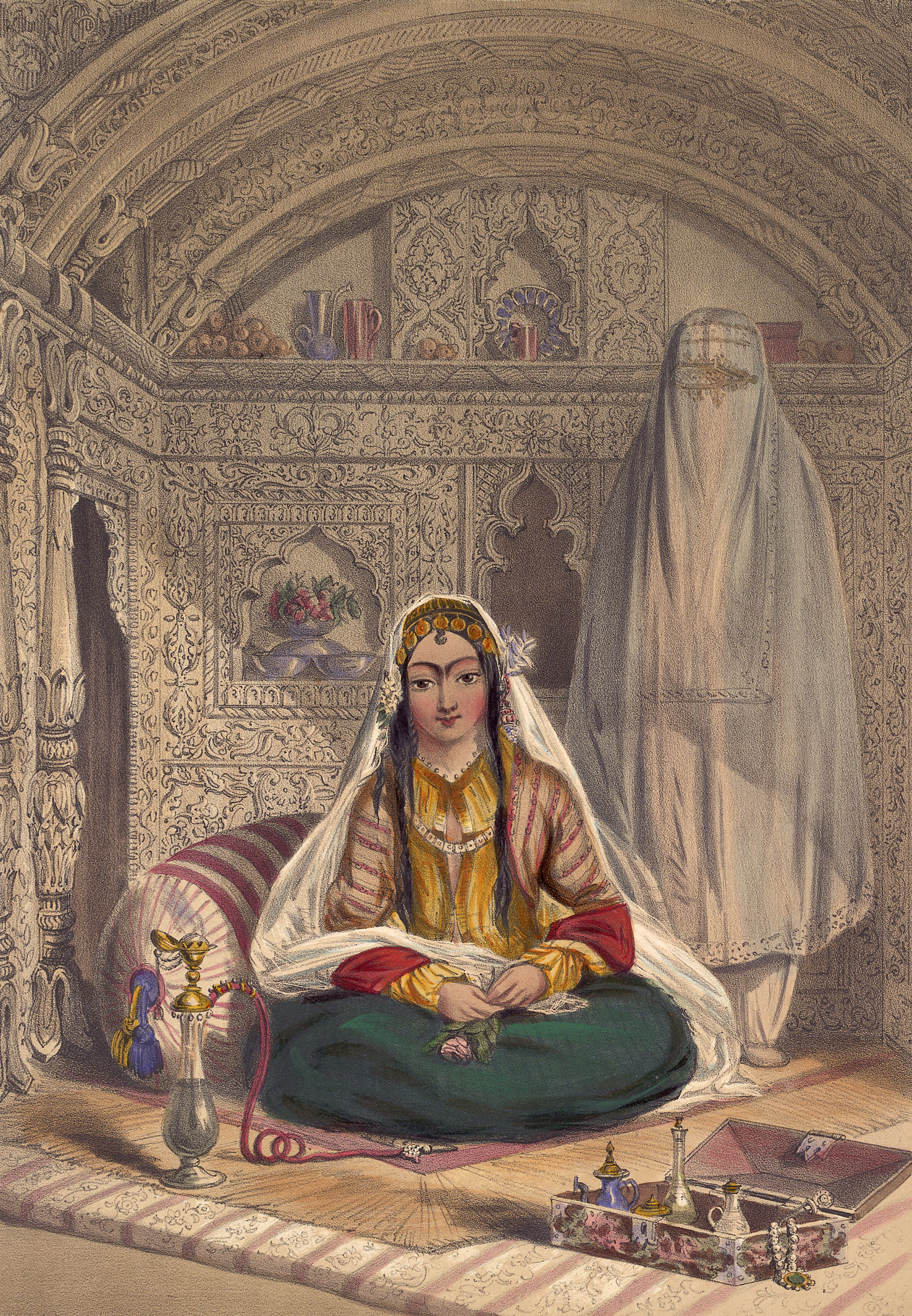
Ladies of Caubul (1848 lithograph, by James Rattray) showing the lifting of purdah in zenana areas – Oriental and India Office Collection, British Library.

Pardah or purdah (from Hindi-Urdu پردہ, पर्दा, meaning "curtain") is a religious and social practice of sex segregation prevalent among some Muslim, Zoroastrian, and Hindu communities in South Asia. The purdah garment is the same as a burqa, or yashmak, i.e. a veil to conceal the face.

The practice generally takes two forms: social segregation of the sexes and the requirement that women cover their bodies, as well as traditionally the faces. A woman who practices purdah can be referred to as pardanashin or purdahnishan.

Practices that restricted women's mobility and behavior existed among religious groups in India and Zoroastrian Iran since ancient times and intensified with the arrival of Islam. By the 19th century, purdah became customary among Hindu elites. Purdah was not strictly observed by lower-class women.

Physical segregation within buildings is achieved with judicious use of walls, curtains, and screens. A woman's withdrawal into purdah usually restricts her personal, social and economic activities outside her home.

Married Hindu women in parts of Northern India observe purdah, with some women wearing a ghoonghat in the presence of older male relations on their husbands' side; Muslim women observe purdah through the wearing of a burqa.

Purdah has been rigorously observed under the Taliban in Afghanistan, where women are required to observe complete purdah at all times while in public. Only close male family members and other women are allowed to see them out of purdah. In other societies, purdah is often only practised during certain times of religious significance.

== Etymology ==
The word purdah is derived from the Hindustani word pardā, which in turn is derived from the Prakrit (pardāha, परदा) and Persian (pardeh, پرده, from Middle Persian pltk', pardag), both ultimately from Proto-Indo-European *pel- ("to cover, wrap; hide, cloth").

== History ==
=== Pre-Islamic origins ===
In ancient Indian society, "practices that restricted women's social mobility and behavior" existed but the arrival of Islam in India "intensified these Hindu practices, and by the 19th century purdah was the customary practice of high-caste Hindu and elite communities throughout India."

Although purdah is commonly associated with Islam, many scholars argue that veiling and secluding women pre-dates Islam; these practices were commonly found among various groups in the Middle East such as Zoroastrian, Christian, and Jewish communities. For instance, the burqa existed in Arabia before Islam, and the mobility of upper-class women was restricted in Babylonia, Persian, and Byzantine Empires before the advent of Islam. Historians believe purdah was acquired by the Muslims during the expansion of the Arab Empire into modern-day Iraq in the 7th century C.E and that Islam merely added religious significance to already existing local practices of the times.

=== Later history ===
Muslim rule of northern India during the Mughal Empire influenced the practice of Hinduism, and the purdah spread to the Hindu upper classes of northern India. The spread of purdah outside of the Muslim community can be attributed to the tendency of affluent classes to mirror the societal practices of the nobility; poor women did not observe purdah. Lower-class women in small villages often worked in fields, and therefore could not afford to abandon their work to be secluded. During the British colonial period in India, purdah observance was widespread and strictly adhered to among the Muslim minority.

In modern times, the practice of veiling and secluding women is still present in mainly Islamic countries, communities and South Asian countries. However, the practice is not monolithic. Purdah takes on different forms and significance depending on the region, time, socioeconomic status, and local culture. It is most commonly associated with some Muslim communities in Afghanistan and Pakistan, along with Saudi Arabia. Purdah has been more recently adopted in northern Nigeria, especially in areas affected by the Boko Haram uprising. It is also observed by Rajput clans of India and Pakistan as a social practice regardless of religion.

== Rationale ==
=== Protection and subjugation ===
Some scholars argue that the purdah was initially designed to protect women from being harassed, but later these practices became a way to justify efforts to subjugate women and limit their mobility and freedom. However, others argue that these practices were always in place as local custom, but were later adopted by religious rhetoric to control female behavior.

=== Respect ===
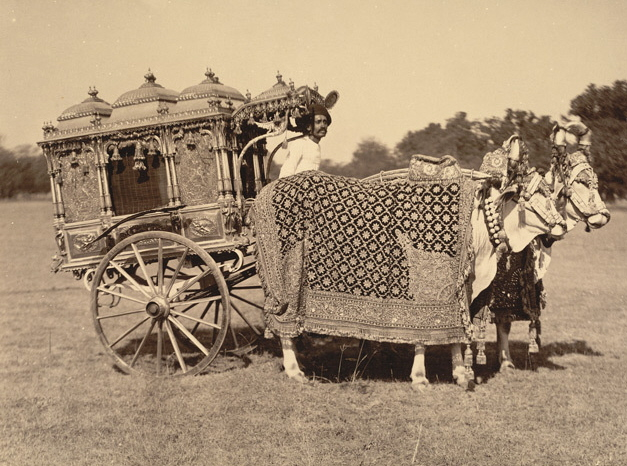
Photograph of a Rajput royal silver zenana carriage in the princely state of Baroda, India. 1895, Oriental and India Office Collection, British Library

Proponents of the practice view purdah as a symbol of honor, respect, and dignity. It is seen as a practice that allows women to be judged by their inner beauty rather than physical beauty.

=== Economic ===
In many societies, the seclusion of women to the domestic sphere is a demonstration of higher socioeconomic status and prestige because women are not needed for manual labor outside the home.

In the past around the 1970s, upper and middle-class women in towns in Pakistan would wear burqas over their normal clothes in public. The burqa was the most visible dress in Pakistan. It is typically a floor length garment worn over the ordinary clothes and is made of white cotton. Many upper-class women wear a two-piece burqa which is usually black in colour but sometimes navy blue or dark red. It consists of a long cloak and a separate headpiece with a drop-down face veil. Some educated urban women no longer wear the burqa. The burqa is also not worn by rural peasant women who work in the fields. In rural areas only elite women wear burqas. Purdah is still common in the rural elite and urban middle class, but not among rural farmers.

=== Individual motivations ===
The rationales of individual women for keeping purdah are complex and can be a combination of motivations, freely chosen or in response to social pressure or coercion: religious, cultural (desire for authentic cultural dress), political (Islamization of the society), economic (status symbol, protection from the public gaze), psychological (detachment from public sphere to gain respect), fashion and decorative purposes, and "empowerment" (donning veils to move in public spaces controlled by men).

== Examples of purdah ==
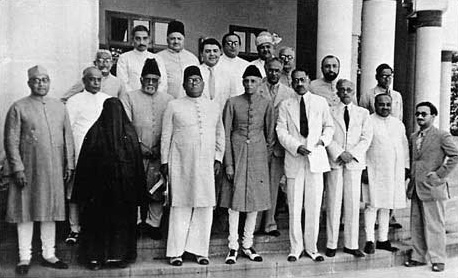
Picture of a meeting of the All-India Muslim League in Lahore in 1940 showing a woman in a body length burqa.

The following reminiscence from C.M. Naim describes the evolution of purdah during the first third of the 20th century among the sharif or genteel people of Avadh, United Provinces, British India:

The word ‘Hijab' is relatively new for me. It was not a part of my vocabulary as I was growing up. I learned it much later, when I began to read literary and religious Urdu texts. ... The relevant word that I learned growing up was purdah. And I learned the word and its many meanings in the observed practice of the various female members of my middle-class family in Bara Banki, a small town in north India.

For Ammi, my grandmother, purdah meant almost never venturing out of the house. On the rare occasions when she did, it was always an elaborate ritual. Visiting a family in the neighbourhood – only on the occasion of some tragedy, ... she used a doli. The little stool slung from a pole that two men carried would be brought to our back door – the door to the zanana or the ladies' section – and the two carriers would step away behind the curtain wall. Ammi would wrap herself in a white sheet and squat on the flat stool, and a heavy custom-made cover would be thrown over her and the doli. The two bearers would then come back and carry the doli away on their shoulders. ... When Ammi traveled in my father's car, she covered herself the same way, while the back seat of the car where she sat was made completely invisible by pieces of cloth hung across the windows.

Apa, my mother, belonged to the next generation. She used a burqa. Hers was a two piece ‘modern' outfit, as opposed to the one-piece – derisively called ‘the shuttlecock' by my sisters – that was preferred by the older or more conservatively spirited in the family. I also remember that the older generation's burqas were usually white, while the new burqas were always black.

Apa’s burqa’ consisted of a skirt and a separate top throw – one that covered her from the head to the thighs. The two pieces allowed for easier movement of both arms and legs. The top had a separate veil hanging over the face, which Apa could throw back in the company of women, e.g. while traveling in the ladies compartment on a train, or hold partly aside to look at things more closely when she went shopping. Apa wore a burqa all her life, except of course when she went to Mecca for Hajj. There she wore the same sheets of ihram that Ammi had to were [sic] earlier. Like all women pilgrims then and now, she too exposed her face to everyone’s sight but not her hair.

... I should not neglect to mention that in those days – I’m talking about the Forties – it was considered improper even for Hindu ladies of certain classes to be seen in public with their hair and faces uncovered, particularly the married women. They never wore a burqa – that was for Muslims alone. Instead, they used a shawl, a plain white sheet, or the palloo of their saris to cover what was not for strangers to see. They too lived in houses that had separate women’s quarters. Their daughters traveled to school daily in a covered wagon that was pushed by two men, just like their Muslim counterparts. (The school was exclusively for girls and had a very high wall surrounding it.)

A different form of veiling, the ghoonghat, is found among some married Hindu women in rural North India. A fold of the sari is drawn over the face when the woman is in the presence of older male in-laws or in a place where there is likelihood of meeting them, e.g. the in-laws' village. It is not worn otherwise, for example, when visiting her mother's home or in a location far from the in-laws' village. Hindu women in other parts of India—south, east, west (below Gujarat)—do not veil themselves.

For both Hindu and Muslim women in the eastern part of the Indian state of Uttar Pradesh, having a "separate women's quarters within the house" is commonplace among families who can afford it.

== Conduct and seclusion ==
Another important aspect of purdah is modesty for women, which includes minimizing the movement of women in public spaces and interactions of women with other men. The specific form varies widely based on religion, region, class, and culture. For instance, for some purdah might mean never leaving the home unless accompanied by a male relative, or limiting interactions to only other women and male relatives (for some Muslims) or avoiding all men outside of the immediate family (for some Hindus). For Muslims, seclusion begins at puberty while for Hindus, seclusion begins after marriage.

== Effects ==
=== Psychology and health ===
By restricting women's mobility, purdah results in the social and physical isolation of women. Lack of a strong social network places women in a position of vulnerability with her husband and her husband's family. Studies have shown that in conservative rural Bangladeshi communities, adherence to purdah is positively correlated with the risk of domestic violence. The restriction on women's mobility limits their ability to access health care and family planning services, especially for unmarried girls. In rural Pakistan, unmarried women and girls had trouble accessing healthcare facilities even in their own villages due to purdah; all types of women had difficulty accessing facilities outside of their villages because they had to be accompanied. Along the same vein, studies of women's contraceptive use in Bangladesh shows that women with decreased observance of purdah and increased mobility are more likely to use contraceptives.

=== Economic participation ===
By restricting women's mobility, purdah places severe limits on women's ability to participate in gainful employment and to attain economic independence. The ideology of purdah constricts women in the domestic sphere for reproductive role and places men in productive role as breadwinners who move through public space. However, due to economic needs and shifts in gender relations, some women are compelled to break purdah to gain income. Across countries, women from lower socioeconomic backgrounds tend to observe purdah less because they face greater financial pressures to work and gain income. Studies show that "it is the poorest, most desperate families that, given the opportunity, are more willing to stress purdah norms and take the social risks entailed when women engage in wage or self-employment". For instance, rural women in Bangladesh have been found to be less concerned with propriety and purdah, and take up work where available, migrating if they need to. They take up work in a variety of sectors from agriculture to manufacturing to the sex trade. However, other studies found that purdah still plays a significant role in women's decisions to participate in the workforce, often prohibiting them from taking opportunities they would otherwise. The degree to which women observe purdah and the pressures they face to conform or to earn income vary with their socioeconomic class.

=== Political participation ===
Social and mobility restrictions under purdah severely limit women's involvement in political decision-making in government institutions and in the judiciary. Lack of mobility and discouragement from participating in political life means women cannot easily exercise their right to vote, run for political office, participate in trade unions, or participate in community level decision-making. Women's limited participation in political decision-making therefore results in policies that do not sufficiently address needs and rights of women in areas such as access to healthcare, education and employment opportunities, property ownership, justice, and others. Gender imbalance in policy-making also reinforces institutionalization of gender disparities.

== Influences on purdah ==
=== Governmental policies on purdah ===
In Tunisia and formerly Turkey, religious veiling is banned in public schools, universities, and government buildings as a measure to discourage displays of political Islam or fundamentalism. Turkey reversed the long-standing ban in 2013. In western Europe, veiling is seen as symbol of Islamic presence, and movements to ban veils have stirred great controversy. For instance, since 2004 France has banned all overt religious symbols in schools including the Muslim headscarf. In Pakistan, India, and Bangladesh where the word purdah is primarily used, the government has no policies either for or against veiling.

=== Islamization ===
Nations such as Pakistan have been swinging to more conservative laws and policies that use rhetoric of following Islamic law, sometimes termed Islamization. The ideology is reinforcing traditional culture, traditional women's roles in the domestic sphere, and the need to protect women's honor. The result is policies that reinforce cultural norms that limit female mobility in the public sphere, promotion of gender segregation, and institutionalization of gender disparities.

=== Women's movements ===
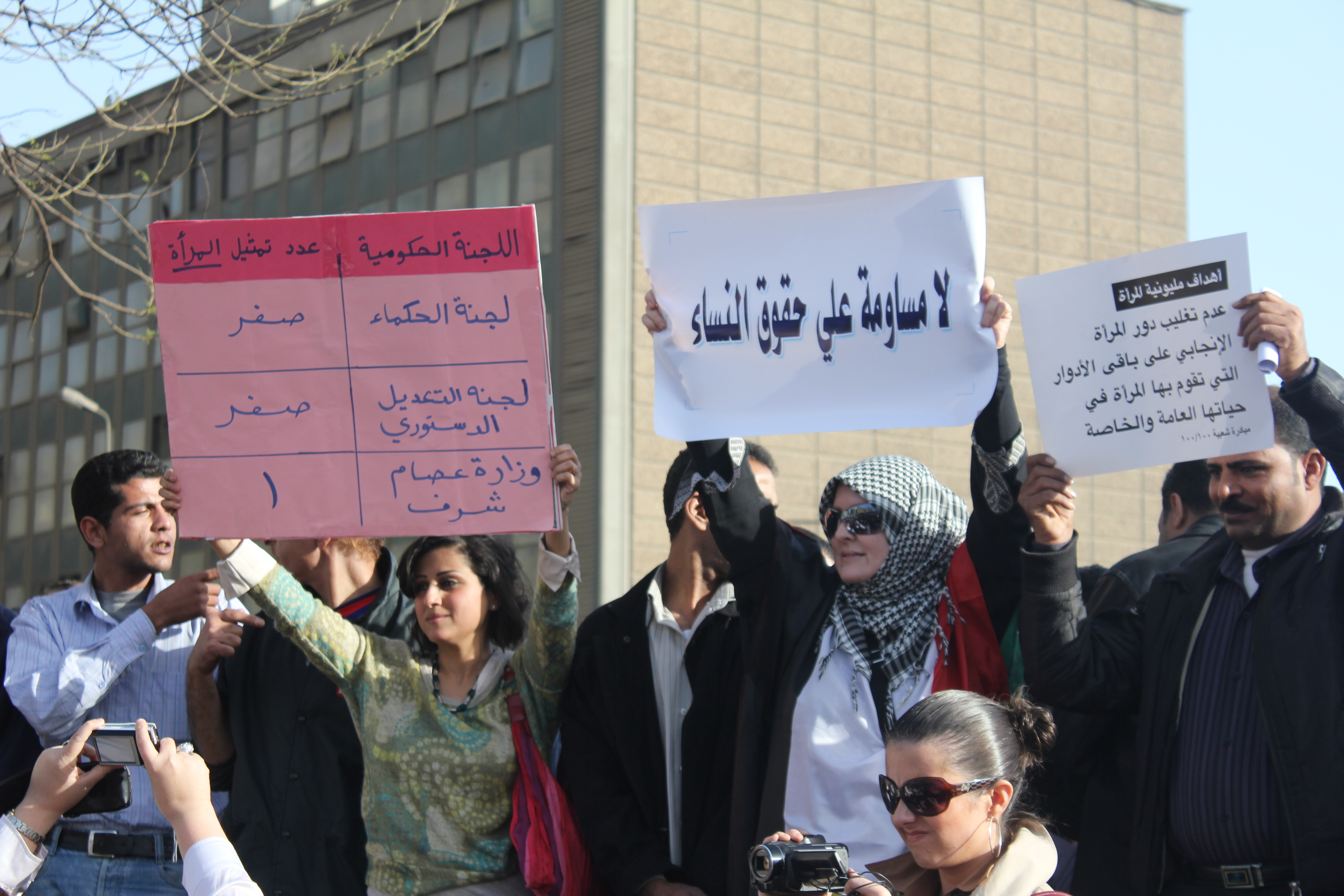
Protest against non-representation of women

Women have been engaging in efforts to challenge the gender inequality resulting from purdah. For instance, women in Pakistan have organized trade unions and attempt to exercise their right to vote and influence decision making. However, their opponents accuse these women of falling for the pernicious influence of Westernization and turning their backs on tradition.

In Bengal, feminist activism dates back to the 19th century. For instance, Begum Rokeya and Faizunnesa Choudhurani played a significant role in emancipating Bengali Muslim women from purdah.

=== Globalization and migration ===
Globalization and Muslim women returning from diasporas has influenced Pakistani women's purdah practice in areas outside of religious significance. One major influence is the desire to be modern and keep up with the latest fashions, or refusal to do so as a source of autonomy and power. Simultaneously, due to modernization in many urban areas, purdah and face-veiling are seen as unsophisticated and backwards, creating a trend in less strict observance of purdah.

For the Muslim South Asian diaspora living in secular non-Muslim communities such as Pakistani-Americans, attitudes about purdah have changed to be less strict. As it pertains to education and economic opportunities, these immigrant families hold less conservative views about purdah after moving to America; for the daughters who do choose to wear the veil, they usually do so out of their own volition as a connection to their Islamic roots and culture.

== Controversy around women's agency ==
=== Purdah as oppression ===
Purdah has repeatedly been criticized as oppression of women by limiting female autonomy, freedom of movement, and access to resources such as education, employment, and political participation. Some scholars such as Prahlad Singh interpret purdah as a form of male domination in the public sphere, and an "eclipse of Muslim woman's identity and individuality". According to scholars such as Elizabeth White, "purdah is an accommodation to and a means of perpetuating the perceived differences between the sexes: the male being self-reliant and aggressive, the female weak, irresponsible, and in need of protection". Geraldine Books writes "in both cases [of spatial separation and veiling], women are expected to sacrifice their comfort and freedom to service the requirements of male sexuality: either to repress or to stimulate the male sex urge".

When purdah is institutionalized into laws, it limits opportunity, autonomy, and agency in both private and public life. The result is policies that reinforce cultural norms that limit female mobility in the public sphere, promotion of gender segregation, and institutionalization of gender disparities.

Sometimes reactions to purdah adherence can become violent. For instance, in 2001 in Srinagar, India, four young Muslim women were victimized by acid attacks for not veiling themselves in public; similar threats and attacks have occurred in Pakistan and Kashmir.

=== Purdah as "protection" ===
Some scholars claim that purdah was originally designed to protect women from being harassed and seen as sexual objects. In contemporary times, some men and women still interpret the purdah as a way to protect women's safety while moving in public sphere. Observing purdah is also seen as a way to uphold women's honor and virtuous conduct. However, critics point out that this view engages victim-blaming and places the onus of preventing sexual assault on women rather than the perpetrators themselves.

== In popular culture and media ==
=== Books ===
"Secluded Women" is criticism of Purdah system by first Muslim feminist and social reformer Bengali writer Rokeya Sakhawat Hossain (1880–1932). Sultana's Dream is a 1905 feminist utopian story written by Hossain. It depicts a feminist utopia (called Ladyland) in which women run everything and men are secluded, in a mirror-image of the traditional practice of purdah. Traditional stereotypes such as “Men have bigger brains” and women are "naturally weak" are countered in Sultana's Dream with logic such as "an elephant also has a bigger and heavier brain" and “a lion is stronger than a man” and yet neither of them dominates men.

== Bibliography ==
- Alibhai-Brown, Yasmin. Refusing the Veil: (Provocations). United Kingdom, Biteback Publishing, 2014.

== See also ==
- Andaruni
- Awrah
- Chador
- Harem
- Hijab by country
- Kithaab
- Sex segregation and Islam
- Terem (Russia)
- Women in Islam
- Women in Pakistan
