= Afghans in Finland =

Finnish Afghans

Afghans in Finland / Finnish Afghans Afganistanilaiset Suomessa / Suomen afganistanilaiset

Total population
- 11,437 born in Afghanistan; 9,003 Afghan citizens (2025)

Regions with significant populations
- Helsinki, Tampere and Turku regions & Jyväskylä

Languages
- Finnish · Languages of Afghanistan

Religion
- Islam, Christianity

Related ethnic groups
- Afghans in the Netherlands, Afghans in Sweden, Afghans in Russia

Afghans in Finland or Finnish Afghans are people who have a background from Afghanistan and who live in Finland. People can be born in Afghanistan, have Afghan ancestors and/or be citizens of Afghanistan. As of 2025, there were 11,437 persons born in Afghanistan living in Finland. Similarly, the number of people with Afghan citizenship was 9,003.

== Migration ==
In late 2015, about half of all the asylum seekers in Finland were Afghans, of which most have arrived through Sweden to Tornio. A large portion of Afghans in Finland are ethnic Hazaras. In 2018, Migri temporarily froze all Afghani applications. Deportations of Afghani asylum seekers has drawn criticism in Finland and other European countries. In 2018, 62% of Afghans asylum seekers received an asylum in Finland.

On 9 July 2021, Finland halted deportations to Afghanistan after the US withdrawal from Afghanistan. In August 2021, in the aftermath of the 2021 Taliban offensive, Finland evacuated a total of 330 people from Afghanistan to Finland during a ten-day operation. 250 of them were Finnish citizens, people with residence permits in Finland, people who had worked at the Finnish Embassy in Kabul and their family members. 80 of them were Finland's quota evacuees consisting of Afghan workers for the European Union and NATO and their family members. A day after the operation, the total number of evacuees increased to 413 when 83 Finnish Embassy's security guards and their family members were evacuated to Finland with the help of the United States.

== Demographics ==
Historical population
Year	Pop.	±% p.a.
1990	4	—
1995	36	+55.18%
2000	338	+56.50%
2005	1,559	+35.76%
2010	2,613	+10.88%
2015	4,280	+10.37%
2020	7,807	+12.77%
2025	11,437	+7.94%
Born in Afghanistan. Source: Statistics Finland

People born in Afghanistan and living in Finland, according to Statistics Finland.

Country of birth Afghanistan by municipality (2024)
Municipality	Population
Whole country	10,936
Helsinki	2,350
Espoo	1,566
Vantaa	1,430
Tampere	1,379
Turku	580
Jyväskylä	383
Hämeenlinna	207
Lahti	201
Oulu	199
Vaasa	172
Kerava	153
Järvenpää	129
Pori	120
Hyvinkää	106
Mikkeli	91
Rovaniemi	91
Kirkkonummi	85
Kuopio	82
Jakobstad	78
Kotka	67
Salo	60
Tuusula	55
Nokia	52
Ylöjärvi	52
Iisalmi	48
Raisio	48
Lohja	46
Pirkkala	44
Joensuu	43
Kajaani	42
Sipoo	38
Kaarina	37
Uusikaupunki	36
Kouvola	35
Seinäjoki	35
Pieksämäki	33
Porvoo	33
Kangasala	30
Nurmijärvi	29
Äänekoski	29
Lappeenranta	28
Raahe	28
Savonlinna	26
Kauniainen	25
Kokkola	25
Mäntsälä	25
Rauma	24
Jämsä	22
Kemi	22
Karkkila	19
Tornio	19
Loimaa	17
Sotkamo	16
Heinola	15
Lempäälä	13
Valkeakoski	13
Lieto	12
Riihimäki	12
Pudasjärvi	11
Huittinen	10
Kristinestad	10
Korsholm	10

People with Afghan citizenship living in Finland according to Statistics Finland.

Citizens of Afghanistan by municipality (2024)
Municipality	Population
Whole country	9,237
Helsinki	1,727
Espoo	1,351
Vantaa	1,169
Tampere	1,082
Turku	443
Jyväskylä	374
Lahti	217
Oulu	194
Hämeenlinna	170
Vaasa	165
Kerava	154
Mikkeli	126
Järvenpää	121
Pori	120
Jakobstad	112
Kuopio	89
Kotka	75
Rovaniemi	75
Iisalmi	62
Kirkkonummi	62
Kajaani	53
Salo	53
Hyvinkää	52
Pirkkala	45
Sipoo	44
Joensuu	43
Kouvola	42
Tuusula	41
Kauniainen	40
Lohja	35
Uusikaupunki	32
Karkkila	31
Nokia	31
Kokkola	30
Raisio	30
Mäntsälä	29
Pieksämäki	29
Porvoo	28
Äänekoski	27
Jämsä	26
Raahe	26
Rauma	26
Nurmijärvi	25
Loimaa	23
Savonlinna	23
Heinola	21
Kangasala	19
Lappeenranta	19
Tornio	18
Kaarina	17
Korsholm	17
Seinäjoki	17
Kemi	16
Pudasjärvi	15
Sotkamo	15
Hollola	14
Hirvensalmi	11
Kristinestad	11
Orimattila	11
Riihimäki	11
Ylöjärvi	11
Lieto	10

== Organizations ==
- Association of Finnish Afghan Associations.

== Notable people ==
- Fareed Sadat, footballer
- Mosawer Ahadi, footballer
- Moshtagh Yaghoubi, footballer
- Nasima Razmyar, politician

== See also ==
- Afghan diaspora
- Immigration to Finland
- Anti-Afghan sentiment
