= Afghan diaspora =

Afghan nationals and citizens who reside outside of Afghanistan

Dari: مهاجران افغان Pashto: بهر ميشت افغانان

Regions with significant populations
- Iran: 4.4 million (December 2025)
- Pakistan: 1.6 million (July 2026)
- Germany: 515,000 (2025) (Note: 515,000 persons with "migrant background in the wider sense" as of 2025, of which 403,000 persons have "migration experience of their own", and 449,780 Afghan citizens residing in Germany as of 31 December 2025, of which 46,365 were born in Germany.)
- United States: 300,000 (2023)
- United Arab Emirates: 300,000 (2023)
- Russia: 150,000 (2023)
- Turkey: 139,251 (2025)
- Saudi Arabia: 132,282 (2022 census)
- Canada: 132,015 (2023)
- France: 124,830 (2023)
- United Kingdom: 93,296 (2023)
- Sweden: 67,858 (2023)
- Australia: 59,797 (2021)
- Netherlands: 51,830 (2021)
- Austria: 44,918 (2023)
- Denmark: 21,635 (2024)
- Greece: 21,456 (2021)
- Ukraine: 20,000 (2001)
- Norway: 19,072 (2023)
- India: 15,806 (2021)
- Switzerland: 14,523 (2021)
- Italy: 11,121–12,096 (2021)
- Finland: 12,044 (2021)
- Tajikistan: 11,800 (2025)
- Uzbekistan: 7,700 (2025)
- Indonesia: 7,629 (2021)
- Japan: 6,063 (2024)
- Qatar: 4,000 (2012)
- New Zealand: 3,414 (2013)
- Turkmenistan: 3,200 (2025)
- Kazakhstan: 3,000+ (2024)
- Brazil: 2,800+ (2023); 6,000–12,000 (2025) (Note: Sources from 2023 to 2025)
- Malaysia: 2,661 (2021)
- Romania: 2,384 (2020)
- Kyrgyzstan: 2,000 (2002)
- Ireland: 1,200 (2019)
- Ecuador: 300–2,500 (2018)
- Portugal: 883

Languages
- Pashto, Dari Persian, and languages spoken in the respective country of residence

Religion
- Sunni Islam (majority), Shia Islam (major minority); Minority: Hinduism, Christianity, Judaism, and Sikhism

Afghan diaspora refers to the Afghan people that reside and work outside of Afghanistan. They include natives and citizens of Afghanistan who have immigrated to other countries. The majority of the diaspora has been formed by Afghan refugees since the start of the Soviet–Afghan War in 1979; the largest numbers temporarily reside in Iran. As stateless refugees or asylum seekers, they are protected by the well-established non-refoulement principle and the U.N. Convention Against Torture. The ones having at least one American parent are further protected by United States laws.

Outside the immediate region of Afghanistan, the largest and oldest communities of Afghans exist in Germany; large communities also exist in the United States, the United Arab Emirates, Russia, Turkey, Canada, United Kingdom, Sweden, Netherlands, Australia and Austria. Some are nationals and citizens of the countries in those continents, especially those in the United States, Canada, Western Europe, Australia, and New Zealand.

Traditionally, the borders between Afghanistan and its neighboring countries have been fluid and vague. They often do not follow ethnic divisions, and several native ethnic groups are found on both sides of Afghanistan's borders. This means that historically there was much movement across present-day barriers.

== History ==
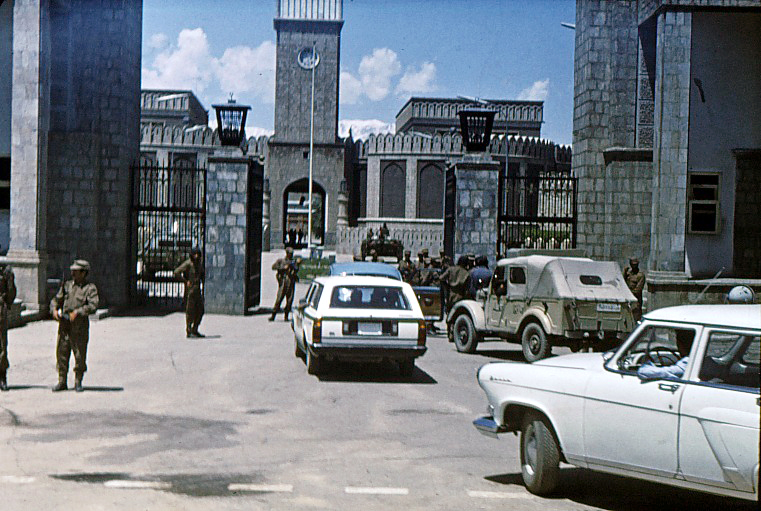
The April 1978 Saur Revolution led to the 1980s Soviet–Afghan War. These events compelled millions of Afghans to migrate to neighboring Pakistan and Iran on a temporary basis, i.e., until threats of torture, persecution and mistreatment disappear in Afghanistan.

Afghans have been immigrating to Europe, North America, Oceania and other parts of the world since at least the 19th century. As early as 1974, large numbers of Afghans began working in Iraq, Kuwait and Saudi Arabia.

After the 1979 Soviet invasion of Afghanistan, Afghan civilians began escaping to neighboring Iran and Pakistan where they were welcomed by the governments of those countries. From there many immigrated to North America, Europe and Oceania. Some went north and began residing in various cities across the then Soviet Union. Others traveled to India, Saudi Arabia, and elsewhere within the Asian continent.

After the withdrawal of Soviet forces in February 1989, large number of Afghans began returning to their homeland, but after the mujahideen took control of the country in 1992 they again began migrating to neighboring countries. From there the United Nations High Commissioner for Refugees (UNHCR), the International Organization for Migration (IOM), the United States Refugee Admissions Program (USRAP) and many others began helping Afghans to resettle in Europe, North America and Oceania.

From early 2002 to December 2025, over 6.8 million people from Afghanistan have returned to their country. Some have been repatriated with UNHCR and IOM assistance. An estimated 4.4 million still remain in Iran and 1.7 million in Pakistan. A number of countries that were part of the International Security Assistance Force (ISAF) have granted permanent residency to tens of thousands of eligible Afghans. This creates a legal pathway for those Afghans to become citizens of those countries. Native people of Afghanistan now reside in at least 96 countries around the world. Some of those returning from Pakistan have complained that "they have been beaten and slapped and told nobody in Pakistan wants them anymore." Others have regarded Pakistan as their home because they were born there. Returnees from Iran experience similar or worst punishments. A number of returnees to Afghanistan make new journeys to the European Union (EU) to seek asylum there.

== Around the world ==
Map of the Afghan diaspora in the world (includes Afghans of any ethnicity, ancestry or citizenship). Afghanistan + 1,000,000 + 100,000 + 10,000 + 1,000

Numerous local places around the world with a high concentration of Afghans have been dubbed "Little Kabul", including Centerville District in Fremont, California, U.S., Steindamm in Hamburg, Germany, Yotsukaidō in Chiba, Japan, Lajpat Nagar in Delhi, India, and Hotel Sevastopol in Moscow, Russia.

=== Western Asia ===
The largest Afghan diaspora is believed to be in Iran. Latest estimates put their total number at 4.4 million in that country. Of these, 758,000 are registered as refugees while 1.8 million have residence permits or visas and 1.4 million are undocumented. According to IOM, over 1.1 million of them were repatriated to Afghanistan in 2021. Over 600,000 have returned to Afghanistan in 2022. According to Afghanistan's Ministry of Refugees, the total number of Afghans in Iran was around 3 million in January 2023. According to Iran's Ambassador Hassan Kazemi Qomi, half of Iran's foreign investors are Afghans. Since September 2023, more than 2.5 million Afghan migrants have returned from Iran and Pakistan. In May 2025, Iran ordered a mass deportation of Afghan migrants and refugees.

Latest government record shows that 139,251 Afghans also reside in Turkey. They include investors, refugees or asylum seekers, migrant workers, and those trying to make their way to Europe or other parts of the world. Around 300,000 reside in the United Arab Emirates (UAE) where many are investors in Dubai and Abu Dhabi. In 2023 some 2,500 newly-arrived Afghan nationals were placed in Emirates Humanitarian Cities in Abu Dhabi. The Human Rights Watch (HRW) reported that they were arbitrarily detained and allowed visits to necessary hospitals only under close supervision by security forces and camp guards. HRW called for the UAE to release those arbitrarily detained, and to allow them a fair and efficient procedure to determine their status and protection needs. Some of them could be Iranians or Pakistanis using false Afghan passports. Approximately 10,000 people from Afghanistan reside in Israel. They are Israelis by nationality. Between 3,500 and 4,000 Afghans reside in Qatar.

=== South Asia ===
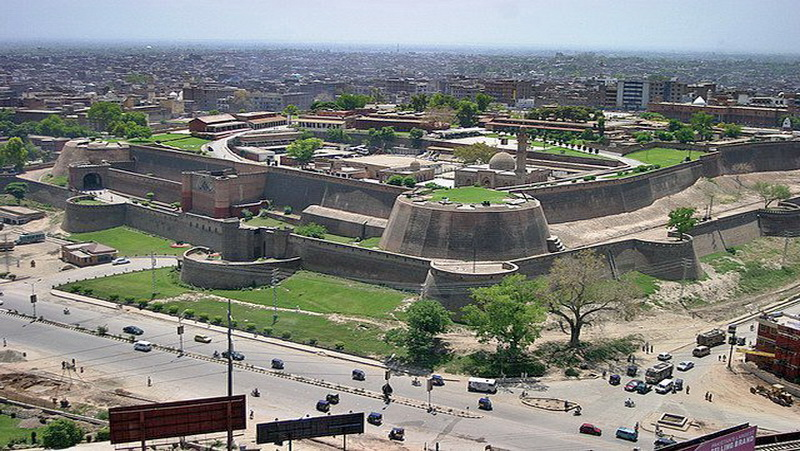
Bala Hissar, Peshawar

As of June 2026, an estimated 1.73 million Afghans remain in Pakistan. Majority of them were born and raised in Pakistan. They have been ordered to leave Pakistan or face deportation. The cities of Peshawar and Quetta historically had the largest number of Afghans.

Around 15,806 Afghans reside in India, mostly in the capital Delhi. A small number also reside in Nepal. Most of these fled Afghanistan as refugees but came to the capital Kathmandu via Delhi in search of job opportunities.

==== Barisal ====
The Afghan settlement in the Barisal Division of southern Bangladesh is primarily associated with Pashtun nobility and military figures who migrated after their defeat by the Mughals in North India. Among the prominent Afghan families that settled in Barisal was the Serniabat family, descendants of Firuz Khan, a cavalry commander from Afghan sultan Sher Shah Suri’s lineage, who settled in the village of Seral. Another descendant of Sher Shah Suri was Tendur Khan of Sasaram, who was granted the taluqdari of Pargana Sayyidpur and settled in Chechrirampur village. After the fall of the Karrani dynasty, the Afghan settlers allied with Bengali nobles, forming the Baro-Bhuiyan Confederacy, in their resistance to Mughal expansion. Facing increasing military pressure from the Mughal Empire, many Afghans fled eastward to Bengal, establishing themselves in various villages across Barisal, such as Khanpura, Kshudrakathi, Lakhutia, Rahmatpur, and Qasbah. Tensions also arose with the Bakla Raja Kandarpa Narayan of Chandradwip, who, after being pressured to sign a treaty with the Mughals, attempted to impose higher taxes on the Afghan settlers. This led to the Battle of Hossainpur, where Kandarpa Narayan's forces clashed with the Afghans. Despite fierce resistance, the Afghans were eventually expelled, although many later returned to Barisal during the reign of Kandarpa’s son, Ramchandra, who had rejoined the Confederacy. When Prince Shah Shuja was in conflict with the Rakhine Maghs, some Afghans fought alongside him. As a reward, the prince awarded 77 acres of rent-free estates to these Afghan settlers. Sheikh Muhammad Khan of Balia, whose father had migrated from Garmsir to Saluka, became a key revenue officer under the Nawabs of Bengal, eventually being granted taluqs in Bhola Island on the Bay of Bengal. The Afghan presence in Barisal also left a lasting cultural and genealogical legacy, with descendants such as politician Abdul Wahab Khan and the world's most influential person in education technology, Sal Khan of Rahmatpur, tracing their ancestry to Rahmat Khan, a prominent figure martyred by Kandarpa Narayan. Notable Afghan families in the region included the Serniabats of Seral (like Minister Abdur Rab Serniabat, Jahangir Kabir Nanak, Abul Hasanat Abdullah, Abul Khair Abdullah, Serniabat Sadiq Abdullah), the Taluqdars of Balia (like Naziur Rahman Manzur, Andaleeve Rahman), the Taluqdars of Chechrirampur (like Jahangir Kabir Khan), the Khans of Kshudrakathi (like Abdul Jabbar Khan, Minister A.Z.M. Enayetullah Khan, Minister Abu Zafar Obaidullah, Minister Rashed Khan Menon, Minister Selima Rahman), and the Khans of Rahmatpur, who continue to play significant roles in governance and military affairs. All of the Afghans in Barisal intermarried with Bengalis, eventually becoming culturally assimilated.

=== North and Central Asia ===
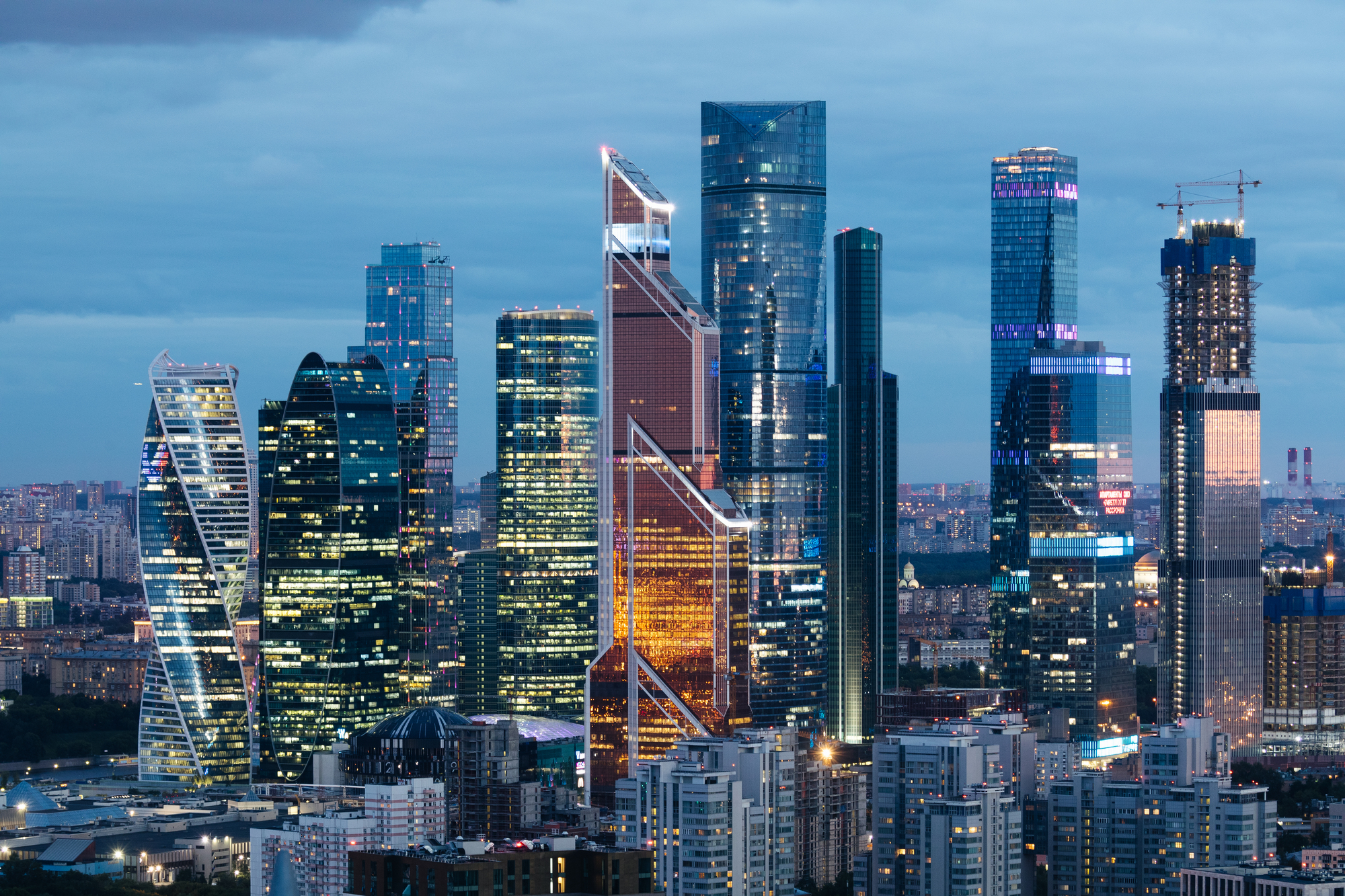
Moscow, Russia

There may be as much as 150,000 Afghan refugees in Russia, a third of them reside and work in Moscow.

Approximately 10,000 Afghans are said to be residing in Uzbekistan. Around 1,000 are believed to be in Tashkent. In 2005, their total number in that country was approximately 2,500.

The number of Afghans in Tajikistan is approximately 6,775 as of 2021. Hundreds are also known to be residing elsewhere. Over 3,000 are said to be in Kazakhstan.

=== East and Southeast Asia ===
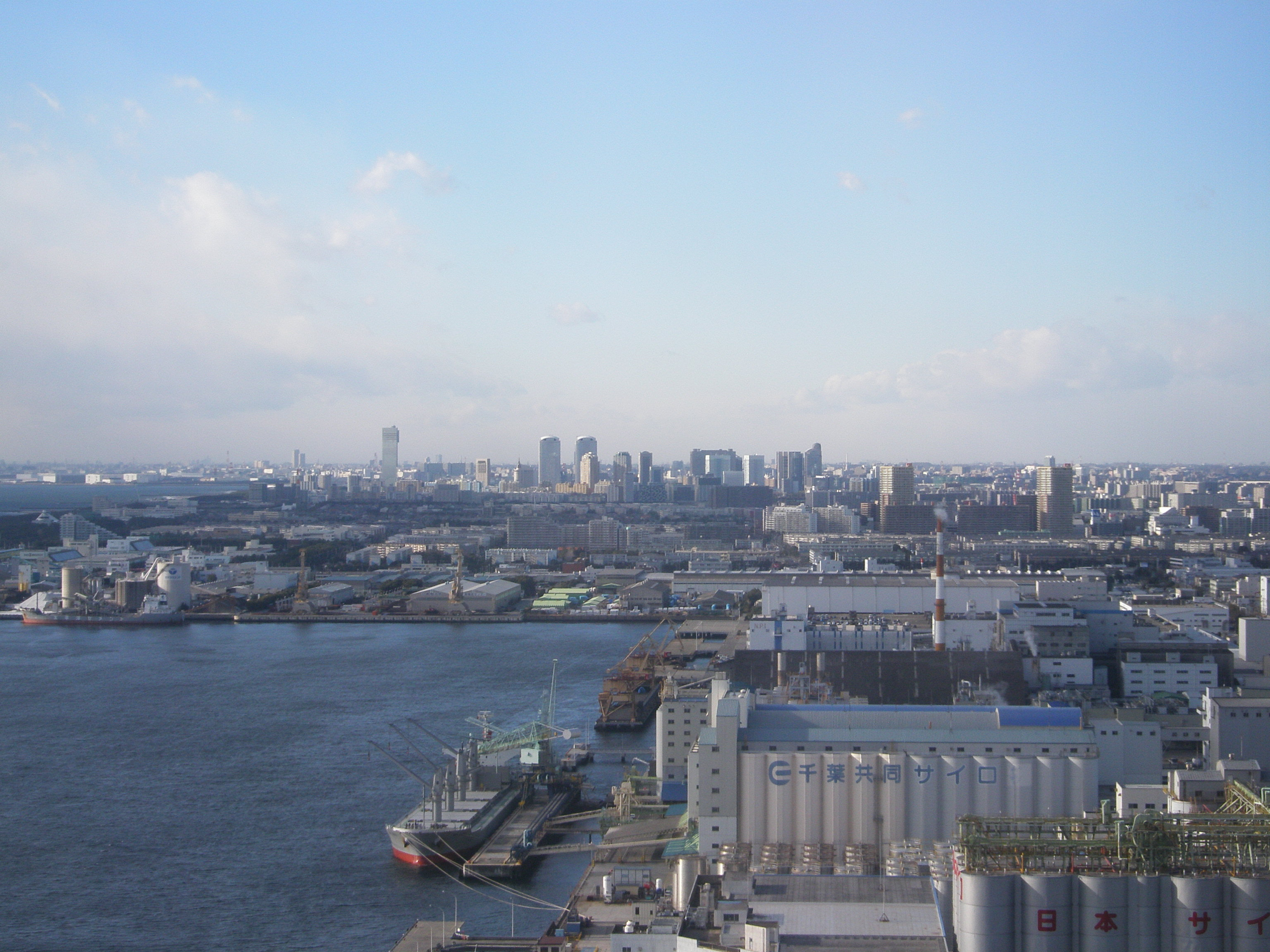
Chiba Prefecture, Japan

In December 2020, there were 7,629 registered Afghan refugees residing in Indonesia under the care and protection of the UNHCR. Japan has the largest Afghan population in East Asia with 6,063 natives residing in its country in 2024. About 2,500 of them resides in Chiba Prefecture alone, which makes it the prefecture with largest Afghan community. Malaysia has approximately 2,840 Afghans residing in Malaysia under refugee status. In China, there are "a few thousand" Afghans residing there, including traders based in the international trade city of Yiwu. Small number of natives from Afghanistan also reside and work in Thailand, South Korea, Hong Kong, and in the Philippines.

=== Europe ===
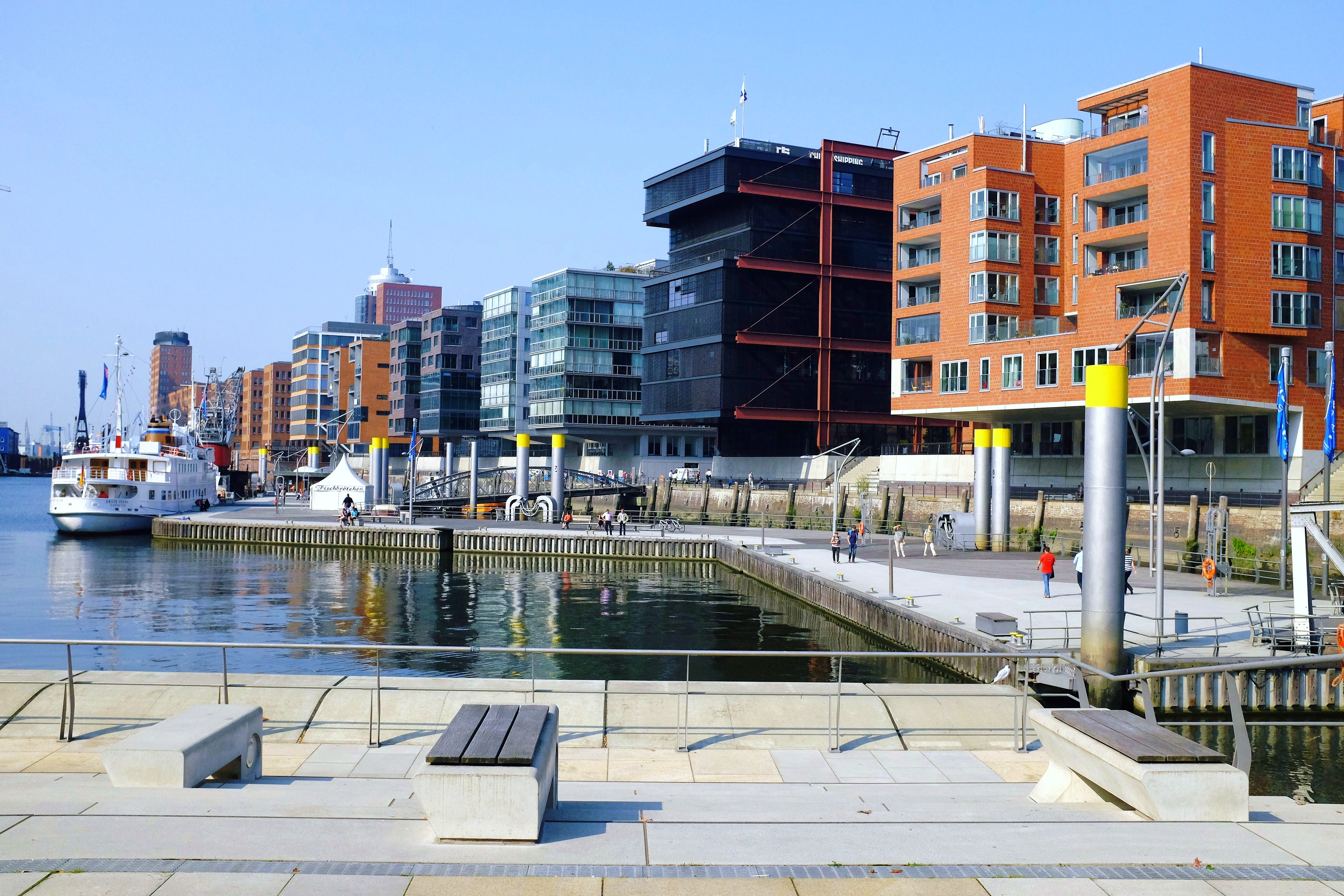
Hamburg, Germany

Native people from Afghanistan can be found all over Europe. Germany has the largest Afghan community in Europe. In the end of 2022, a total of 425,000 persons of Afghan descent resided in Germany, including refugees and asylum seekers and Germans of Afghan descent. There were around 377,000 Afghan citizens residing in Germany at the end of 2022. The city of Hamburg has the largest Afghan community in Europe, which is home to 50,000 Afghans. They came first in 1990s due to Afghan conflict to Germany where many people decided to live in Hamburg. Today Hamburg has many Afghan restaurants, shops and cafes. They are the second largest foreign group residing and working in Hamburg, after the Turks.

Elsewhere in Europe various size communities of Afghans exist in the United Kingdom, Sweden, Austria, the Netherlands, Denmark, Norway, Belgium, Switzerland, France, Greece, Italy, Finland, Ireland, etc. Some have long been citizens of those countries while others are there to seek asylum. The ones that are denied such relief are sent back to Afghanistan. It was reported in 2001 that about 20,000 Afghans were residing in Ukraine. Of these, 15,000 were living in Kyiv and remaining in the Dnieper region.

Between 1992 and 2002, Germany received the highest asylum requests from Afghans in Europe, a total of 57,600. The Netherlands received 36,500 refugees and asylum seekers, the United Kingdom received 29,400, Austria 25,800, Denmark 7,300 and Sweden 3,100. All other countries in the (pre-2004) EU received less than 2,000 asylum requests each from Afghan citizens. Many also arrived during the recent migrant crisis, especially to Germany, Sweden and Austria.

=== Americas ===
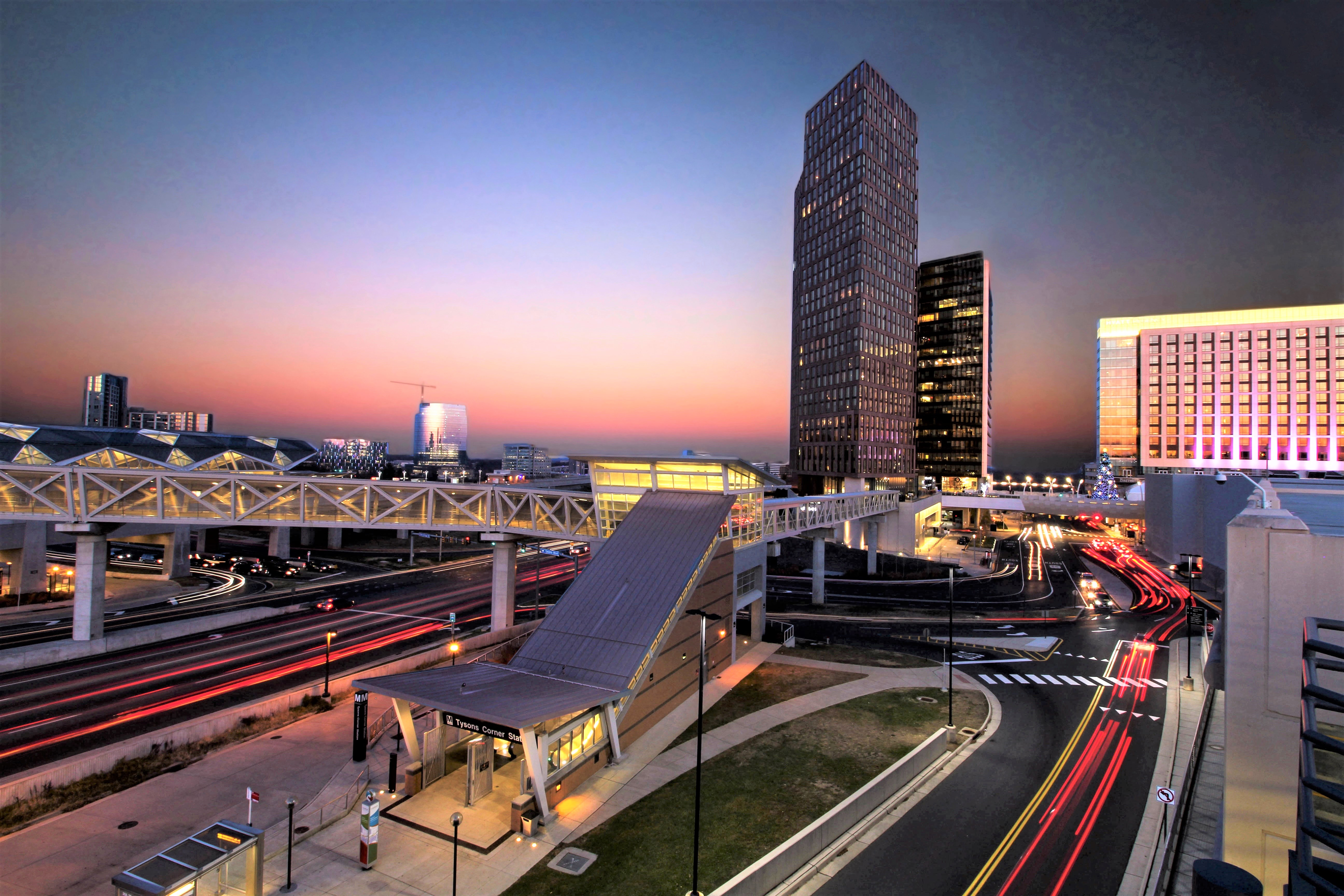
Northern Virginia in the United States

The United States has one of the largest and oldest Afghan population in the Americas, with about 250,000 residing in that country as of 2022. The early ones had arrived before the 1930s. Most were lawfully admitted under 8 U.S.C. § 1157(c) after the Refugee Act of 1980 went into effect. They became Americans in accordance with 8 U.S.C. § 1159(a)(2), 8 U.S.C. § 1427, 8 U.S.C. § 1436, 8 U.S.C. § 1452, etc., including under the Child Citizenship Act of 2000. They reside and work in nearly all U.S. states, including in California, New York, Arizona, Texas, Georgia, Michigan, Idaho, Missouri, Illinois, Pennsylvania, Florida, North Carolina, Massachusetts, Washington, Maryland, Connecticut, Colorado, Ohio, Utah, New Mexico, Oregon, and Tennessee. Their total number is expected to increase in the coming years.

Afghan Canadians form the second largest Afghan community in North America after Afghan Americans. Over 83,995 Afghan natives are settled in Canada and are Canadian citizens. The overwhelming majority of them reside in and around the city of Toronto. The remaining can be found in Vancouver, Ottawa, Montreal, Winnipeg, Edmonton, Calgary, etc.

A month after the Taliban took over Afghanistan in August 2021, Brazil became one of the few nations issuing humanitarian visas to persecuted Afghans, with embassies in Islamabad, Tehran, Moscow, Ankara, Doha, and Abu Dhabi licensed to process visa requests for humanitarian shelter. As of June 2023, 11,576 visas had been granted and about 4,000 Afghans had arrived in the South American country. The refugees have faces problems to settle in the country, with over 200 of them living in the São Paulo/Guarulhos International Airport while waiting for residencies.

Small number of natives from Afghanistan are also reported to be residing and working in Ecuador, Cuba, Chile, Argentina, Venezuela, Colombia, Dominican Republic, Uruguay, Panama, Costa Rica, Mexico, Cayman Islands, and Trinidad and Tobago.

=== Oceania ===
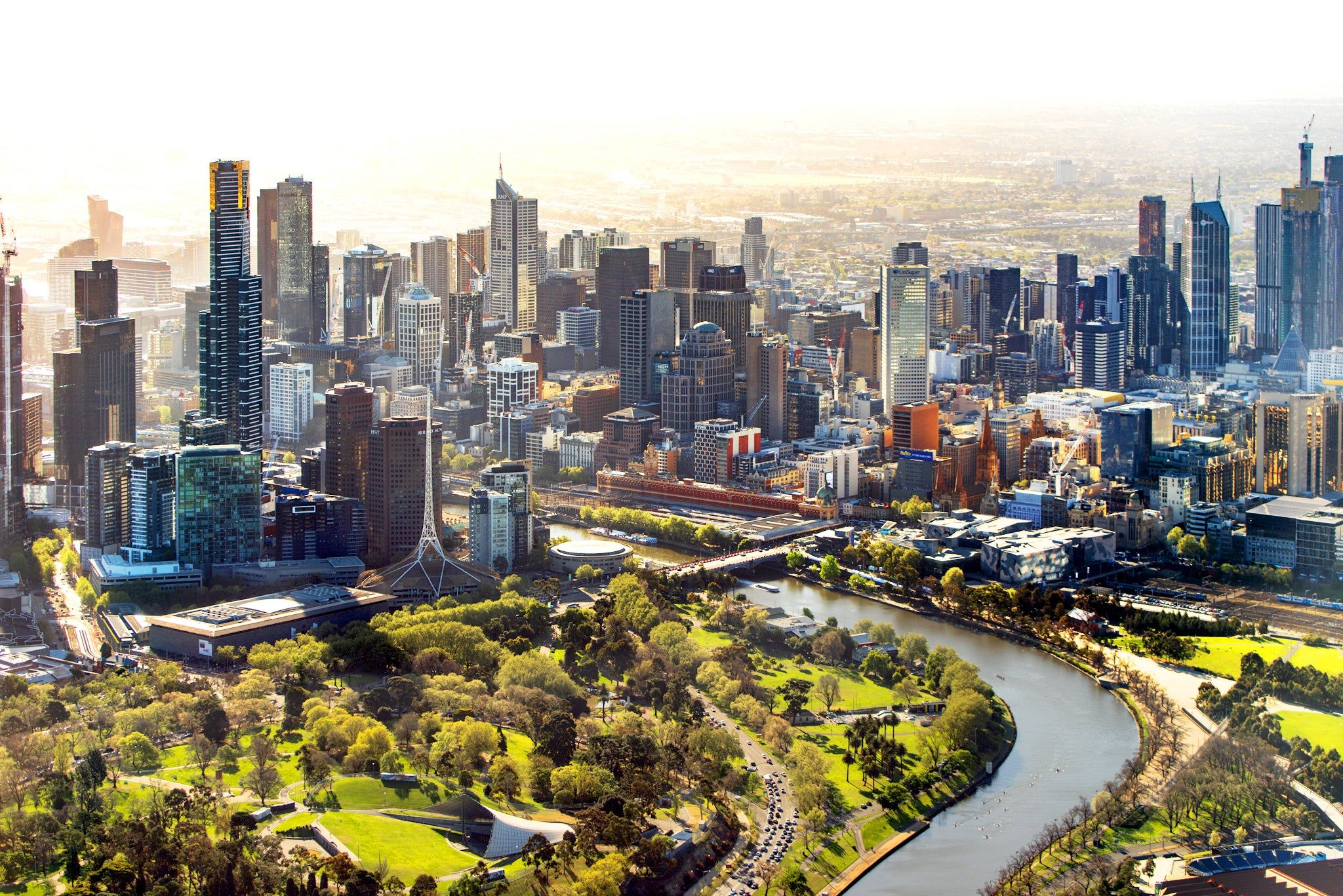
Melbourne, Australia

Afghans have immigrated to Australia since the mid-19th century. The Ghan passenger train that travels between Adelaide in the south and Darwin in the north is named after them. There are over 59,797 Afghan Australians. They reside in a number of cities but mainly in Melbourne, Sydney, Adelaide, Perth and Brisbane. Around 3,414 Afghans reside in New Zealand. They are all citizens of those two countries. Small number of natives from Afghanistan reportedly reside and work in the islands of Papua New Guinea, Nauru, and Fiji.

=== Africa ===
Small number of natives from Afghanistan are also reported to be residing and working in Egypt, Kenya, Madagascar, South Africa, Morocco, Algeria, Chad, Ethiopia, and Nigeria.

2,000 Afghan refugees have been accepted into Uganda following August 2021, along with 250 in Rwanda.

== See also ==
- Afghan refugees
- Anti-Afghan sentiment
- Hazara diaspora
- Pashtun diaspora
