= Afghans in Qatar =

Foreigners in Qatar

Total population
- 6,000 (estimate)

Languages
- Arabic · Dari · Pashto

Religion
- Islam

Afghans in Qatar are part of the larger Afghan diaspora around the world. They are citizens of Afghanistan residing in Qatar. According to latest reports, their total population is around 6,000 individuals. Of these, approximately 4,900 are registered workers and 1,100 are Special Immigrant Visa (SIV) applicants hoping to be relocated to the United States.

In 2012, the Afghan Embassy in Doha had statistics putting the number of Afghans in Qatar at around 2,600; about 1,000 of them had Pakistani passports. After the Taliban takeover of Afghanistan in August 2021, Qatar took in a number of Afghan refugees and SIV applicants. Many of them received education at the Doha campus-in-exile of the American University of Afghanistan. They were processed by U.S. agencies and housed in Doha.
