= Afghan refugees =

Displaced nationals of Afghanistan

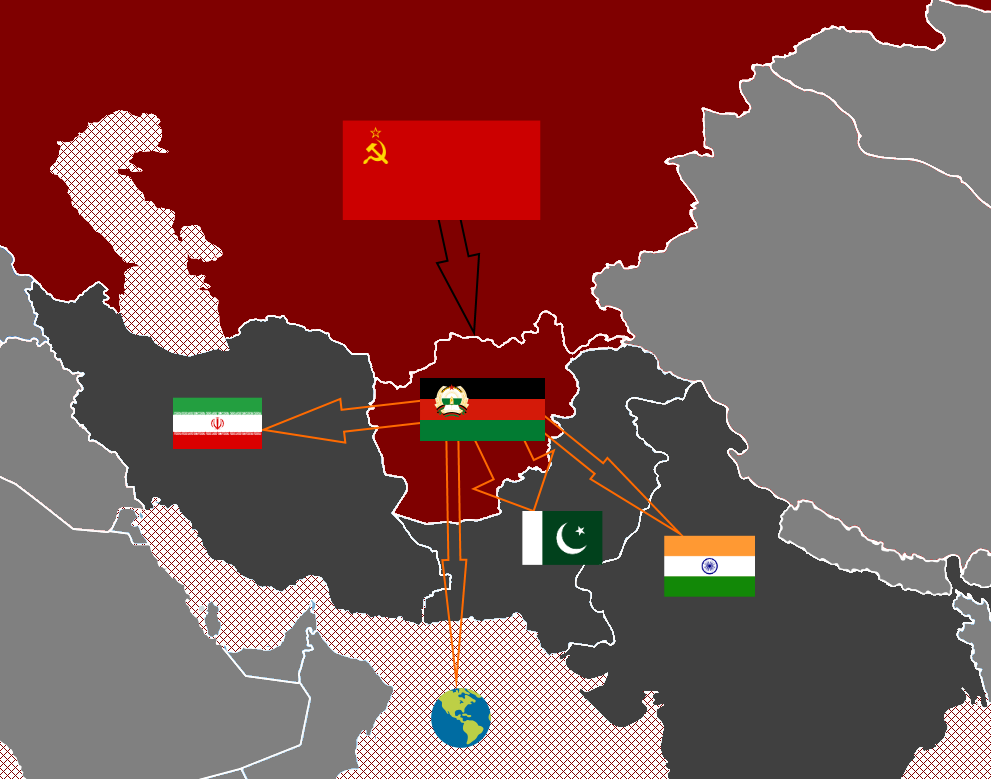
Map showing the flow of Afghan refugees following the Soviet invasion of Afghanistan in 1979

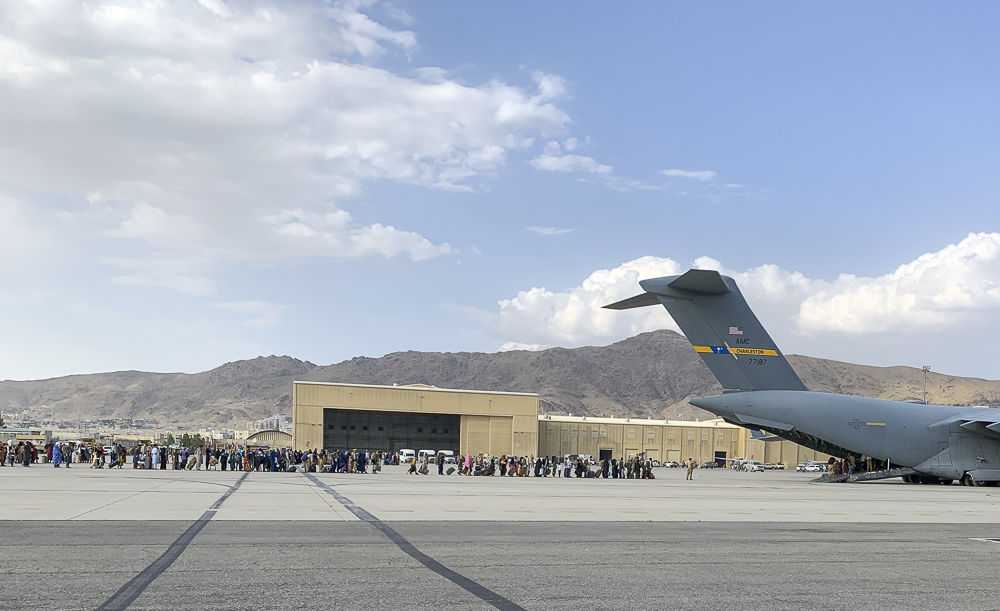
Afghan evacuees boarding American aircraft during Operation Allies Refuge in 2021

Afghan refugees are native people of Afghanistan who are lawfully residing in other countries under the protection of those countries or the United Nations High Commissioner for Refugees (UNHCR). Their total number was around 3.6 in early 2001. From the formation of the Afghan Interim Administration in late 2001 to the present-day, over 6 million of them have gradually returned to Afghanistan under the UNHCR repatriation program, most of them from Pakistan and Iran.

The 1979 Soviet invasion of Afghanistan marked the beginning of the first major wave of internal displacement and international migration. Most Afghans crossed over into neighboring Iran and Pakistan while smaller numbers made it to India, Russia and other countries. Some estimate that over 6 million had fled the country as refugees during the 1980s. Following the Soviet withdrawal in 1989, many began returning to Afghanistan while others were fleeing from the 1990s civil war.

Some countries that were part of the International Security Assistance Force established programs to allow thousands of Afghans to resettle in the Western world. As stateless refugees or asylum seekers, they are protected by the well-established non-refoulement principle and the U.N. Convention Against Torture. They receive the maximum government benefits and protections in countries such as Australia, Canada, Germany, the United Kingdom, and the United States. For example, those that receive green cards under 8 U.S.C. § 1159 can immediately become "non-citizen nationals of the United States" pursuant to 8 U.S.C. § 1452(b), without needing to meet the requirements of 8 U.S.C. § 1427(a). This allows them to travel with distinct United States passports. Australia provides a similar benefit to admitted refugees. Following the Twelve-Day War, Iran began the 2025 Afghan deportation from Iran which according to sources will add up to 4 million Afghans.

== Internal displacement ==
According to the International Organization for Migration (IOM), there are over three million internally displaced people in Afghanistan as of early 2026. Past military actions and violence by the various warring factions usually played a major part in the displacement, although there are also reasons of major natural disasters. The 1980s Soviet–Afghan War caused approximately 2 million Afghans to be internally displaced, mostly from rural areas into urban areas. The 1992-1996 civil war caused a new wave of internal displacement, with many citizens moving to northern areas in order to avoid the subsequent Taliban totalitarianism. The 2001-2021 US-led war in Afghanistan has led to an increase in internal displacement.

== Major host countries ==
Native people of Afghanistan and their children lawfully reside in at least 96 countries around the world. About three in four Afghans have gone through internal and/or external displacement in their life. Unlike in certain other countries, all admitted refugees and those granted asylum in the United States are statutorily eligible for permanent residency (green card) and then U.S. nationality or U.S. citizenship. All of their children automatically become Americans if they fulfill all of the requirements of 8 U.S.C. § 1408(4), 8 U.S.C. § 1431(a) or 8 U.S.C. § 1433(a). This extends their privileges, and gives all of them additional international protection against any unlawful threat or harm.

=== Pakistan ===
According to the latest report of the United Nations High Commissioner for Refugees (UNHCR), there are approximately 733,734 registered Afghan refugees in Pakistan. Of these, 51.1% reside in Khyber Pakhtunkhwa, 28.2% in Balochistan, 12.7% in Punjab, 5.1% in Sindh, 2.6% in the capital Islamabad and 0.3% in Azad Kashmir. Most were born and raised in Pakistan in the last four decades but are considered citizens of Afghanistan. Some are actually citizens of Pakistan. They could return to Afghanistan under the UNHCR voluntary repatriation program or seek firm resettlement in other countries. The largest Afghan refugee camp was established in the Swabi District of Khyber Pakhtunkhwa in the north-west of the country. Another was Jalozai in Nowshera District.

Since 2002, over 4.7 million registered Afghan refugees have been repatriated through the UNHCR from Pakistan to Afghanistan. Many Pakistanis have registered themselves as Afghan refugees, and some members of the Taliban and their family have resided among them in Pakistan. Others such as the Special Immigrant Visa (SIV) applicants and their family members, who are awaiting to be firmly settled in the United States, are also residing among the Afghan refugees in Pakistan. Regarding the Taliban, Prime Minister of Pakistan stated the following:

What the Taliban are doing or are not doing has nothing to do with us. We are neither responsible, nor the spokesperson for the Taliban.

— Imran Khan, July 2021

On 3 October 2023, Pakistan's Interior Minister Sarfraz Bugti ordered all undocumented foreigners, particularly Afghan nationals, to voluntarily leave the country or face deportation. Taliban authorities condemned the deportations of Afghans as an "inhuman act." In 2025 even documented Afghans were forced to leave Pakistan.

=== Iran ===
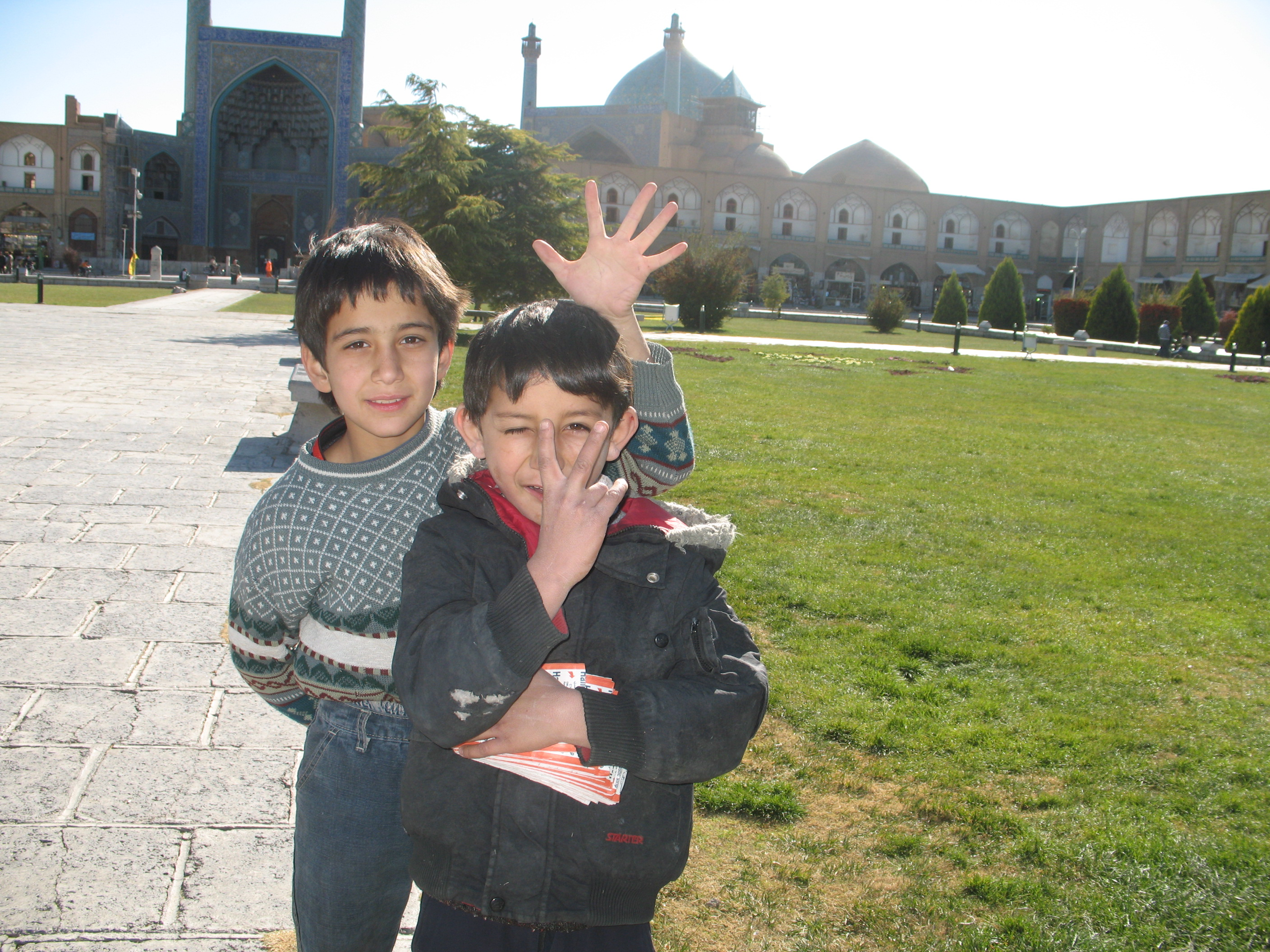
Afghan children at Naqsh-e Jahan Square in Esfahan, Iran. (2007)

According to the UNHCR, there are 758,000 registered Afghan refugees residing in Iran. Majority of them were born in Iran during the last four decades but are still considered citizens of Afghanistan. Iran has long been used by Afghans to reach Turkey and then Europe where they apply for political asylum. As in Pakistan, the Afghan refugees are not firmly settled but reside there on a temporary basis.

Iran's initial response towards Afghan refugees, driven by religious solidarity, was an open door policy where Afghans in Iran had freedom of movement to travel or work in any city in addition to subsidies for propane, gasoline, certain food items and even health coverage. In the early 2000s, Iran's Bureau for Aliens and Foreign Immigrants Affairs (BAFIA) initiated registration of all foreigners, including refugees. It began issuing temporary residence cards to certain Afghans. In 2000, the Iranian government also initiated a joint repatriation program with the UNHCR. Laws were passed in order to encourage the repatriation of Afghan refugees, such as limits on employment, areas of residence, and access to services including education. In 2021, the International Organization for Migration (IOM) found that just over one million Afghans have been sent back. In 2023, Iran along with Pakistan decided to deport more refugees. In May 2025, the Iranian government ordered the mass deportation of an estimated 4 million Afghan migrants and refugees. By the end of 2026, around 8 million Afghans living in Iran and Pakistan have returned to their native country.

=== India ===
India hosts over 15,000 Afghan refugees within its borders. The majority of them reside in the nation's capital Delhi, specifically in the neighborhoods of Lajpat Nagar, Bhogal and Malviya Nagar. Some of them operate "shops, restaurants and pharmacies." Afghan refugees were admitted to India during and after the 1980s Soviet–Afghan War. A lot of the once-vibrant Sikhs in Afghanistan and Afghan Hindus have become refugees in India. Also much of Afghanistan's Christian community thrives within India. In 2021, following the end of the latest war in Afghanistan, India has offered an emergency visa (the 'e-Emergency X-Misc Visa') to some citizens of Afghanistan.

Afghan refugees in India have sought protection primarily due to political instability and conflict in Afghanistan. India hosts thousands of Afghan refugees, many of whom are registered with the UNHCR. While India is not a signatory to the 1951 Refugee Convention, it has provided long-term visas and access to education and healthcare for Afghan refugees. The Indian government has also pledged material support for the rehabilitation of returning Afghan refugees. However, challenges remain, including legal uncertainty, lack of official refugee status, and limited access to employment opportunities.

== Other host countries ==
=== Canada ===
When the Taliban seized control of Afghanistan in August 2021, the Canadian Government announced it would resettle 40,000 vulnerable Afghans such as women and girls, members of Afghanistan's LGBTQ community, human rights workers and journalists. This was in addition to an earlier initiative to resettle thousands of Afghans who had worked for the Canadian Government, such as interpreters and embassy employees, as well as their families. By March 2022, Canada resettled 8,580 Afghan refugees. By August 2022, the first anniversary of the fall of Kabul, that number had risen to 17,375. Ahmed Hussen, Minister of International Development, on 27 September 2023 announced that Canada initiated an aid of providing $14 million in development funding for 2 projects in support of health and essential services for Afghan refugees and host communities in Pakistan impacted by last year's flooding. Of this $14 million, $10 million is being allocated to the United Nations High Commissioner for Refugees for essential services and recovery efforts, such as the rehabilitation of schools and health facilities, the provision of livelihood training and services associated with gender-based violence. The remaining $4 million will go to the World Health Organization for health services, including sexual, reproductive, maternal, neonatal, child and adolescent health care and for gender-based violence services.

=== Uganda ===
On 17 August, after the fall of Kabul, Ugandan Government announced that based on United States' request, they will be temporarily hosting 2000 Afghan refugees. The refugees were expected to be brought in batches of 500 to Entebbe where UNHCR has secured Imperial Hotels for their arrival and screening. The number of refugees currently residing in Uganda is unclear, but according to reports, Ugandan officials had confirmed the arrival of 145 refugees on Sunday, 22 August 2021. Another 51 Afghans were received at the Entebbe International Airport by the Government of the Republic of Uganda on 25 August 2021.

=== United States ===
Over the past 40 years, the number of Afghan immigrants living in the United States has risen from roughly 4,000 to nearly 195,000. The majority of this population increase has occurred between two periods: 2010-2019 and from 2021 forward. Between the 10 year periods in the 2010s, the Afghan population rose from 54,000 in 2010 to roughly 132,000 in 2019. Additionally, that population jumped again in 2021 in the midst of the American military withdrawal from Afghanistan, when it surged by an additional 76,000.

Afghan refugees resettled per 100K residents after the 2021 Afghan withdrawal and evacuation in each U.S. state and the District of Columbia according to CBS News

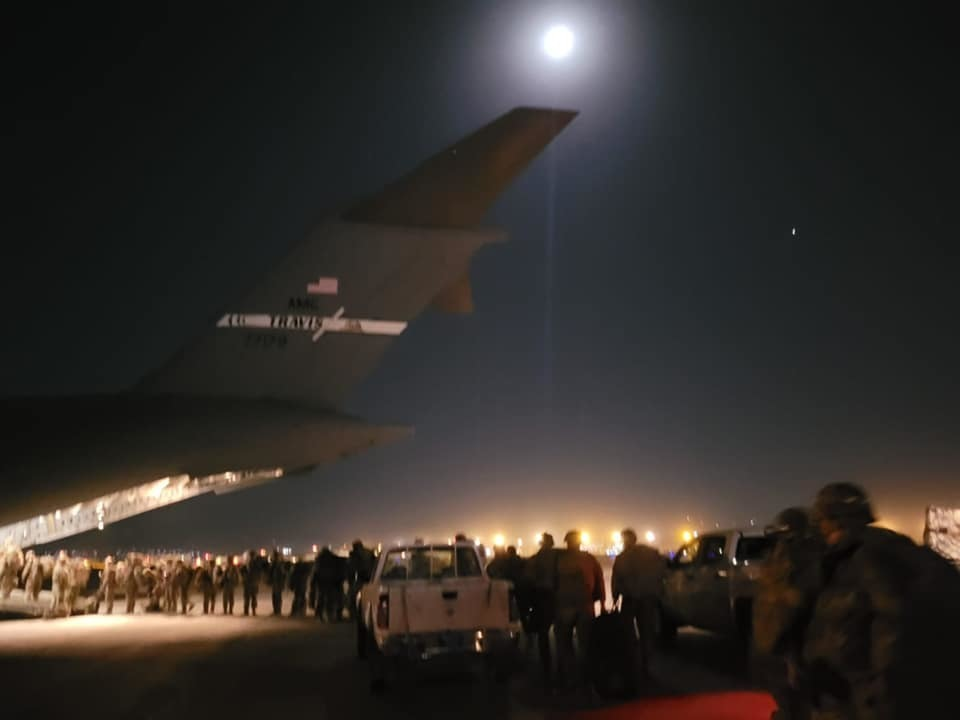
U.S. soldiers board a C-17 during final departures from Kabul Airport, 30 August 2021.

On 7 August 2021, due to the threat from the Taliban, the U.S. Embassy Kabul announced to all American citizens living in Afghanistan to begin evacuating themselves from the country and that all employees of the embassy leave immediately if "their function could be performed from elsewhere."

Although, the Department of State, on 27 April 2021, had ordered American troops to withdraw from Afghanistan by 11 September, it was not until early August 2021 that the security situation of Kabul deteriorated drastically. This was a time when Taliban militia were taking over Afghanistan one city and/or province at a time. On 12 August, the U.S. Embassy Kabul issued a security alert directing all US citizen to leave Afghanistan immediately using commercial flights if they can, and if they could not afford it, they could contact the embassy to get information regarding repatriation loan.

On 18 August 2021, the Embassy issued another alert to US citizen and LPRs (lawful permanent residents) with their spouse and unmarried children to travel to the Hamid Karzai International Airport and enter the airport at Camp Sullivan. When news of this reached the ears of the many Afghan citizens trying to escape the rule of Taliban, they rushed to HKIA.

In 2021 Afghanistan started its largest humanitarian evacuations in history, involving more than 80,000 people.

And thus began, the second phase of Operation Allies Refuge from 15 to 31 August 2021. On 21 and 25 August, the U.S. Embassy once again issued security alerts advising US citizen to avoid travelling to the airport and to evacuate the Abbey Gate, East Gate and North Gate immediately.

On 26 August 2021, CNN reported two explosions at the HKIA that killed 13 US Marines and approximately 60 Afghans outside the airport walls.

The US admitted more than 10,000 Afghan refugees from the United Arab Emirates, which became a temporary host to them on behalf of other nations. However, nearly 12,000 refugees remained in the Abu Dhabi facility as of August 2022. Refugees began to protest the slow and opaque resettlement process and the living conditions. The protests resurfaced in October 2022. A refugee who moved to Canada said they are “psychologically suffering” in the Emirati facility.

Throughout the course of Operation Allies Welcome, the United States issued humanitarian parole status to more than 76,000 evacuated Afghan nationals. Humanitarian parole serves as a method for individuals otherwise ineligible for admission into the United States to be given temporary permission to enter the country by the Secretary of Homeland Security. These individuals are paroled into the country as a result of "urgent humanitarian reasons or [for] significant public benefit" In the case of Afghan nationals, this status was given for a period of 2 years, additionally granting these parolees employment authorization in the country. Individuals granted humanitarian parole status differ from their counterparts admitted through Special Immigrant Visa (SIV) or the standard immigration process, in that they lack set pathway to achieve Lawful Permanent Residency (or Green Card) status.

In June 2023, the UN Food and Agriculture Organization (FAO) and the UN World Food Programme (WFP) discussed the current situation in Afghanistan. “In Afghanistan, approximately 15.3 million people (35 percent of the population analysed) are estimated to face high acute food insecurity … including just under 2.8 million people in Emergency … Over 3.2 million children and 804,000 pregnant and breastfeeding women are acutely malnourished.”

In the same month, the Department of Homeland Security (DHS) opened up a new program for Afghan nationals residing in the United States. This program allowed for Afghan Humanitarian Parolees to re-apply to the United States Customs and Immigration Services (USCIS) for parole status if they fell into eligible categories, particularly if they had been initially paroled into the United States as part of the initial Operation Allies Refuge. The policy was put into place by the administration of President Joe Biden, and additionally allowed for the extension of employment authorization for any individual whose re-parole was approved.

Afghan parolees residing in the United States continue to face an unclear future when it comes to permanent residency. Efforts such as the Afghan Adjustment Act have been introduced into both the 117th and 118th US Congressional sessions in an effort to provide a pathway to citizenship for Afghan nationals, however the bill has yet to pass both Houses of Congress, partly as a result of its key omission from the 2022 omnibus spending bill (the Consolidated Appropriations Act of 2022). Opposition to the Act has largely come from Republican lawmakers, particularly Senator Chuck Grassley, who stated in 2022 that he would not stand behind the bill "as long as the vetting process is not improved." Multiple Republicans have echoed this point of view, after two individuals of the more than 76,000 admitted were found to potentially pose a threat to National Security as a result of a report from the Office of the Inspector General.

=== United Kingdom ===
Hundreds of former Afghan special forces who fought alongside British troops in Afghanistan have been refused resettlement to the UK. One former UK Special Forces officer told the BBC that "At a time when certain actions by UK Special Forces are under investigation by a public inquiry, their headquarters also had the power to prevent former Afghan Special Forces colleagues and potential witnesses to these actions from getting safely to the UK."

== Statistics ==
As shown in the chart below, registered Afghan refugees were admitted to other countries during the following periods:

- Soviet–Afghan War (1979–1989)
- Afghan Civil War (1992–96)
- Taliban Rule (1996–2001)
- War in Afghanistan (2001–2021)

Country	Soviet–Afghan War (1979–89)	Civil War (1992–96)	Taliban Rule (1996–2001)	War in Afghanistan (2001–2021)
Pakistan	3,100,000			1,438,432
Iran	3,100,000			780,000
Germany				147,994
Turkey				129,323
United States	132,000			89,500
Austria				40,096
France				31,546
Sweden				29,927
Greece				21,456
India	60,000			15,806
Switzerland				14,523
Italy				12,096
Australia				10,659
United Kingdom				9,351
Indonesia				7,629
Tajikistan		1,161	15,336	5,573
Netherlands				5,212
Belgium				4,689
Norway				4,007
Finland				3,331
Malaysia				2,661
Romania				2,384
Canada				2,261
Denmark				2,134
Portugal				883

== Human rights abuses ==
Human rights abuses against admitted Afghan refugees and asylum seekers have been widely documented. They include mistreatment, persecution or torture in Pakistan, Iran, Turkey, Greece, Romania, Serbia, Hungary, Germany, the United States and several other NATO-members states. Afghans living in Iran, for example, were deliberately restricted from attending public schools. As the price of citizenship for their family members, Afghan children as young as 14 were recruited to fight in Iraq and Syria for a six-month tour.

Afghan refugees were regularly denied visas to travel between countries to visit their family members, faced long delays (usually a few years) in processing of their visa applications to visit family members for purposes such as weddings, gravely ill family member, burial ceremonies, and university graduation ceremonies; potentially violating rights including free movement, right to family life and the right to an effective remedy. Racism, low wage jobs including below minimum wage jobs, lower than inflation rate salary increases, were commonly practiced in Europe and elsewhere. Unsanitary conditions have been reported at US air bases, and one Afghan refugee's online post of his food portion at Fort Bliss in 2021 drew some hateful responses. Many Afghan refugees were not permitted to visit their family members for a decade or two. Studies have shown abnormally high mental health issues and suicide rates among Afghan refugees and their children.

== See also ==
- International Organization for Migration (IOM)
- United Nations High Commissioner for Refugees (UNHCR)
- Anti-Afghan sentiment
