= Afghans in Sweden =

Swedish Afghans
Total population
- 58,780 (born in Afghanistan); 9,430 (born in Sweden to parents born in Afghanistan)

Regions with significant populations
- Stockholm, Gothenburg, Malmö

Languages
- Pashto, Dari, Swedish

Religion
- Islam

Swedish Afghans (Swedish: Personer i Sverige födda i Afghanistan) are citizens and residents of Sweden who are of Afghan descent, part of the worldwide Afghan diaspora.

== History ==
A few thousand Afghan refugees came to Sweden during the 1990s and there were 14,420 Swedes of Afghan descent by 2010. The number of incoming Afghans skyrocketed after the European migrant crisis in 2015-2016 as Sweden was one of the top destinations of Afghan migrants.

== Demographics ==
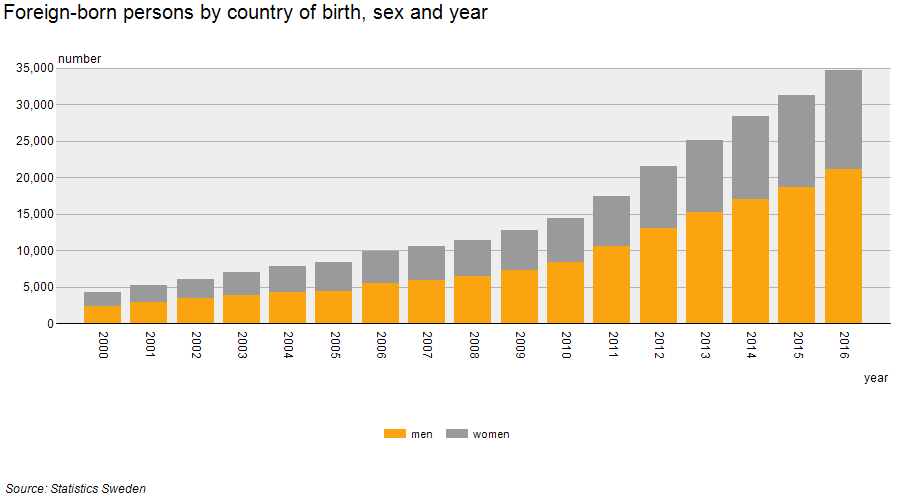
Afghanistan-born persons in Sweden by sex, 2000-2016 (Statistics Sweden).

According to Statistics Sweden, as of 2016, there are a total 34,754 Afghanistan-born immigrants living in Sweden. Of those, 28,049 are citizens of Afghanistan (17,602 men, 10,447 women).

== Education ==
As of 2016, 39% of the Afghanistan-born individuals aged 25 to 64 have attained a primary and lower secondary education level (33% men, 45% women), 30% have attained an upper secondary education level (34% men, 25% women), 11% have attained a post-secondary education level of less than 3 years (13% men, 9% women), 13% have attained a post-secondary education of 3 years or more (16% men, 11% women), and 7% have attained an unknown education level (4% men, 9% women).

== Employment ==
According to Statistics Sweden, as of 2014, Afghanistan-born immigrants aged 25–64 in Sweden have a very low employment rate of approximately 40%.

As of 2014, according to the Institute of Labor Economics, Afghanistan-born residents in Sweden have an employment population ratio of about 22%. They have an unemployment rate of approximately 17%.

== Notable people ==
- Norlla Amiri
- Ahmad Khan Mahmoodzada
- Jusef Erabi

== See also ==
- Demographics of Afghanistan
- Education in Afghanistan
- Education in Sweden
- Islam in Sweden
- Afghan diaspora
- Afghans in Finland
- Anti-Afghan sentiment
