= Afghans in Turkey =

Ethnic group in Turkey

Total population
- 139,251 (2024)

Languages
- Dari · Pashto · Turkish · Uzbek

Religion
- Islam

Afghans in Turkey are part of the larger Afghan diaspora around the world. They are citizens of Afghanistan residing in Turkey, mainly in the cities of Ankara and Istanbul. According to government reports, their total population was around 139,251 individuals in 2024. Of these, over 42,000 were detained by Turkish authorities in 2025 and over 29,000 in 2026. They include visa and residence permit (Ikamet) holders, refugees, asylum seekers, and irregular migrants. The refugees and asylum seekers are protected from forceful deportation by the non-refoulement principle and the U.N. Convention Against Torture.

Like many other immigrants, Afghans use Turkey as a place of temporary residence to work or meet overseas family members, relatives, and friends. Some are en route to Europe for the purpose of applying for asylum in countries such as Germany and the United Kingdom. Others stay in Turkey until their visas to North America are issued. Meanwhile, those found in violation of law are often sent back to Afghanistan.

== History ==
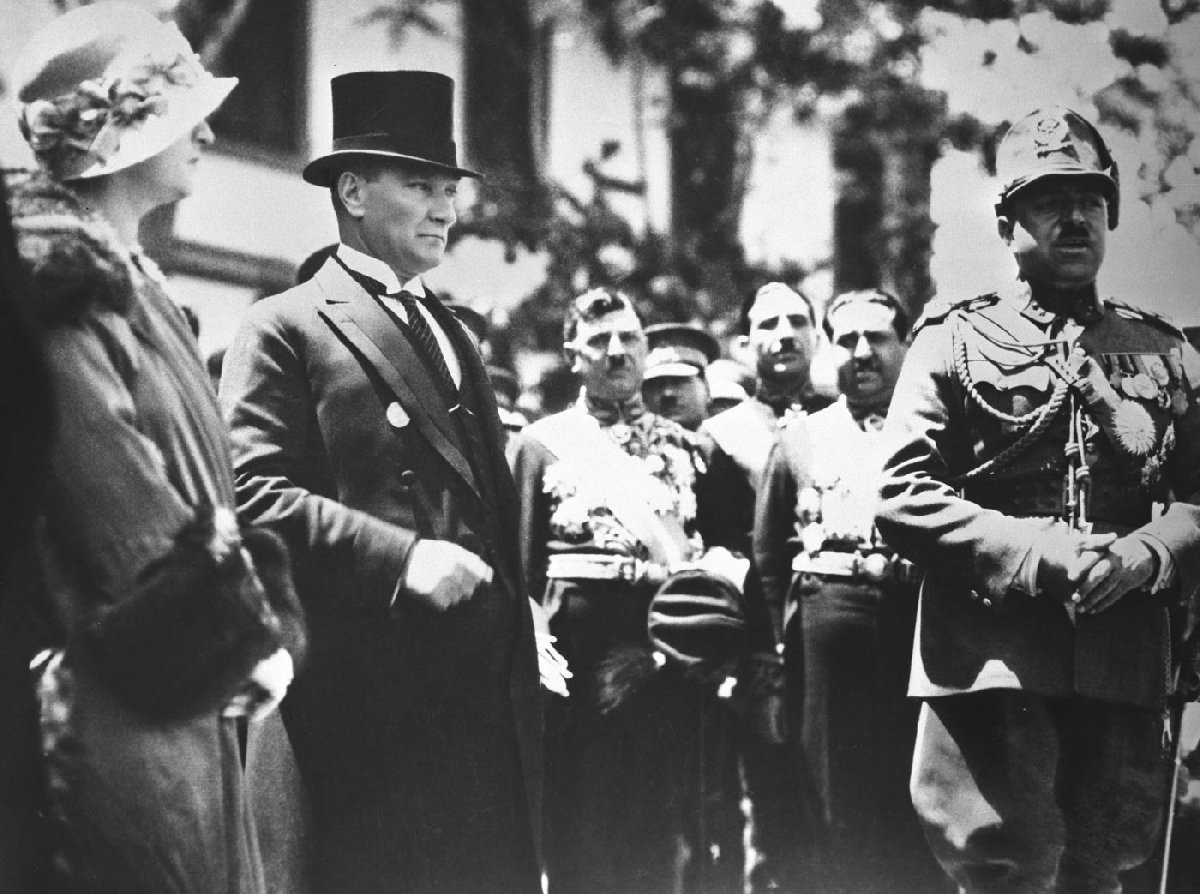
Mustafa Kemal Atatürk with visiting Afghan King Amanullah Khan (1928)

In the early 20th century, some Afghan forces were sent by King Amanullah Khan to assist Mustafa Kemal Atatürk in his War of Independence. Afghans immigrating to Turkey dates back to the 1980s Soviet–Afghan War. However, due to the obscure state of irregular migration, maintaining accurate statistics of Afghans in Turkey has been difficult. In 2002, an article by the Turkish newspaper Hurriyet claimed that there were "thousands" of Afghans living throughout the country.

=== Recent migration and deportation ===
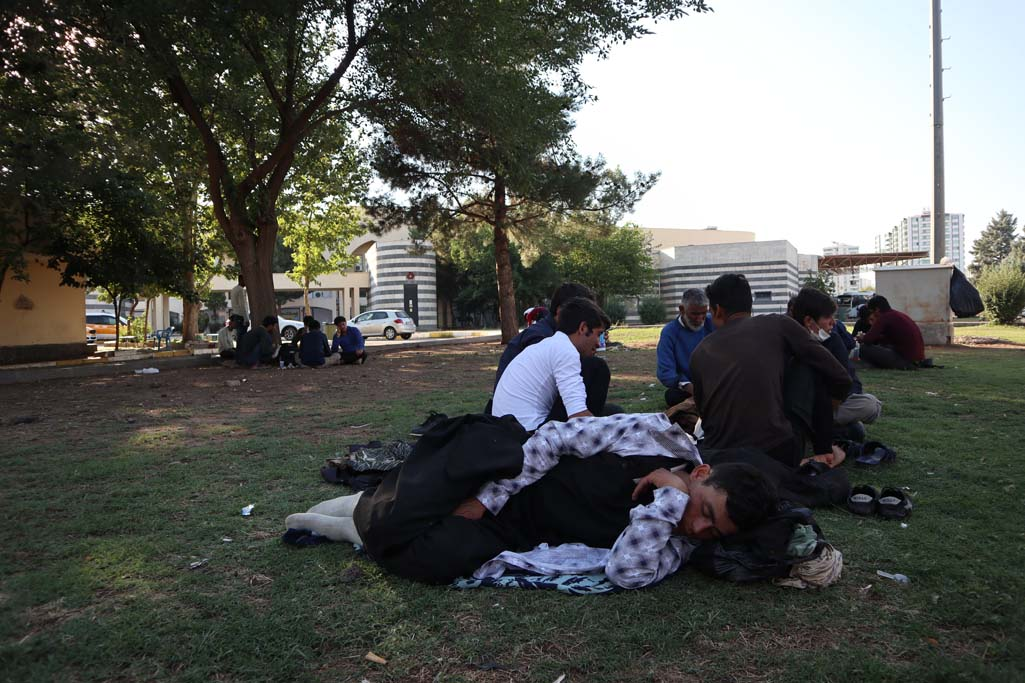
A group of Afghan men sitting outside in Diyarbakır (2021)

From the years 2003 to 2007, the number of irregular Afghan migrants apprehended were significant, with statistics almost doubling during the last year. Most had fled the recent war in Afghanistan. In 2005, refugees from Afghanistan numbered 300 and made a sizeable proportion of Turkey's registered foreigners. Most of them were spread out over satellite cities with Van and Ağrı being the most specific locations. In the following years, the number of Afghans entering Turkey greatly increased, second only to migrants from Iraq; in 2009, there were 16,000 people designated under the Iraq-Afghanistan category. Despite a dramatic 50 percent reduction by 2010, reports confirmed hundreds living and working in Turkey. In January 2010, Afghans consisted one-sixth of the 26,000 remaining refugees and asylum seekers. By mid-2021, their total estimated number surged to 200,000. The President of Turkey stated in August 2021 that there were a total of 300,000 Afghans in Turkey. Tens of thousands have been deported to Afghanistan every year.

== See also ==
- Afghanistan–Turkey relations
- Embassy of Afghanistan, Ankara
- Turkic peoples in Afghanistan
