= Afghans in the Netherlands =

Dutch Afghans
Afghanen in Nederland افغانها در هلند افغانان په هالنډ کې

Total population
- 51,830 (2021); 0.3% of the Dutch population

Languages
- Dutch, Dari, Pashto

Religion
- Predominantly Islam, with small Hindu and Sikh minorities

Afghans in the Netherlands are Dutch citizens and non-citizen residents born in, or with ancestors from, Afghanistan. In 2015 there were 44,000 Dutch Afghans, which form one of the largest Afghan diaspora communities as well as one of the main Asian communities in the Netherlands. Most of the first generation immigrants settled in the Netherlands between 1992 and 2001.

== Migration history ==
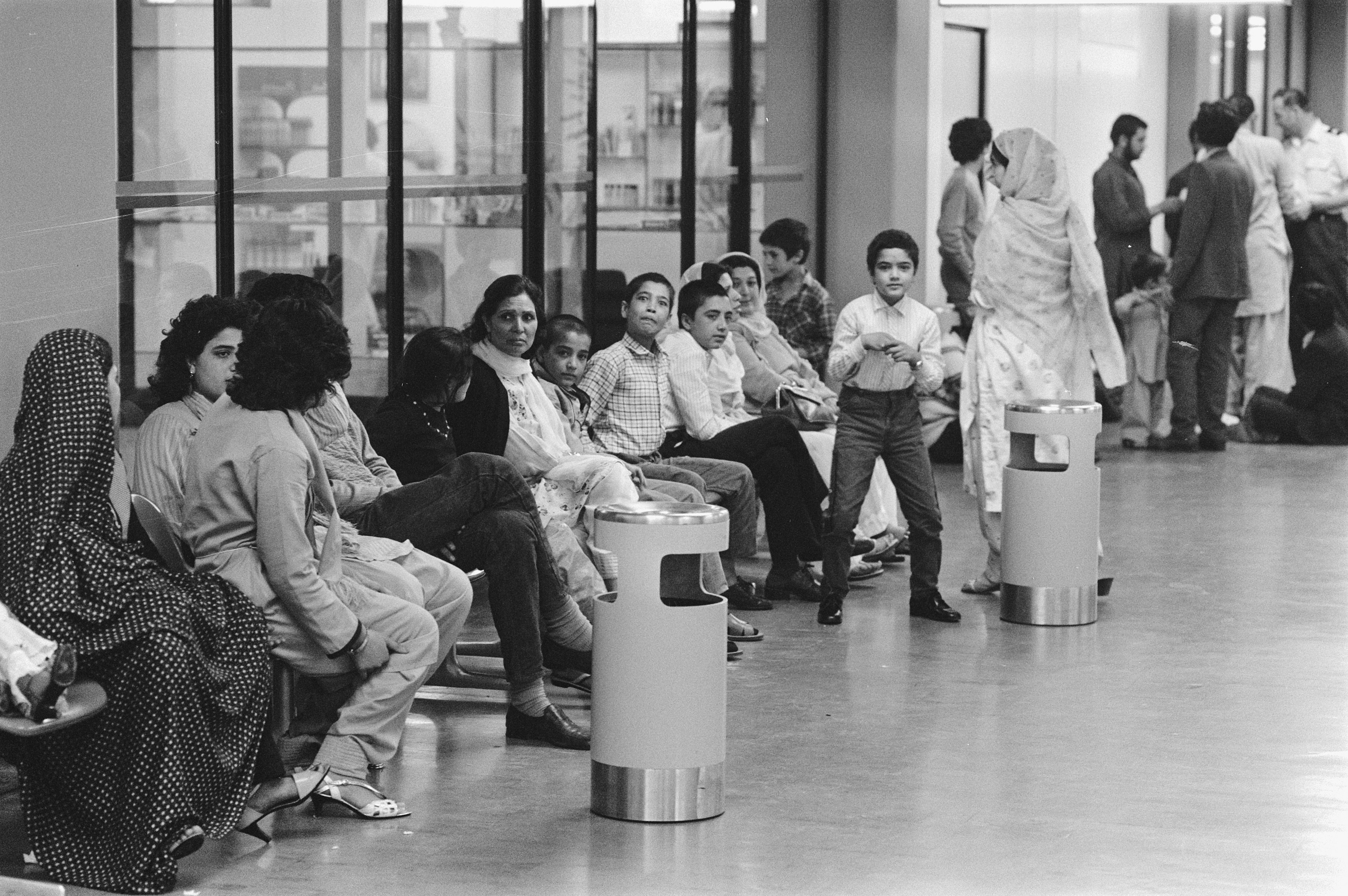
A group of Afghan refugees at Schiphol, 1986

Afghan refugees began arriving in the Netherlands in the late 1980s, fleeing violence in their homeland. In the decade up to 2002, the Netherlands was the second-most popular destination in Europe for Afghan asylum-seekers, behind Germany; they made up more than 20% of the total of roughly 170,000 applications for asylum filed by Afghans in Europe. The Dutch government settled them in a variety of areas with the policy aim of preventing the formation of large immigrant communities in the cities. The number of asylum requests peaked in 1998 during this period.

Given the increasing number of asylum-seekers, the Dutch government set up a war crimes investigation unit in the late 1990s; the first refugees they charged with war crimes were Heshamuddin Hesam and Habibulla Jalalzoy, both former members of the Afghan intelligence service KHAD during the 1980s Soviet–Afghan War. Their presence, when it became known, evoked a great deal of unrest and fear among the Netherlands' Afghan community. Charged with abusing prisoners in a 2005 trial, they received sentences of 12 and 9 years in prison, respectively.

In 2003, the Netherlands signed a voluntary repatriation agreement with the United Nations High Commission for Refugees and the transitional government of Afghanistan, recognising the right of Afghan refugees in the Netherlands to return to Afghanistan and establishing procedures. However, by 2007, only 800 had returned; most refugees feel that public safety, women's rights, and educational conditions in Afghanistan are insufficient. Young people who choose to return may also encounter language difficulties, as they exhibit language shift towards Dutch and away from Dari.

== Demographics ==
=== Population ===
As of 2011, statistics of the Dutch Centraal Bureau voor de Statistiek to people of Afghan origin showed:

- 31,823 persons of first-generation background (17,238 men, 14,585 women)
- 8,241 persons of second-generation background (4,244 men, 3,997 women), of which:
  - 361 persons with one parent born in the Netherlands (185 men, 176 women)
  - 7,880 persons with both parents born outside the Netherlands (4,059 men, 3,821 women)

For a total of 40,064 persons (21,482 men, 18,582 women). This represented more than eight times the 1996 total of 4,916 persons. The proportion of persons of second-generation background increased from 7.7% to 21% over the same period; the rest of the growth was due to immigration. 2010 was the first year since 2003 that population growth by immigration exceeded population growth by natural increase. As with other migrant ethnic groups, their age structure is skewed towards young people—90% are younger than 45, a similar proportion to Turkish, Iranian, and Somali migrants, but much higher than the equivalent figure of 60% in the native Dutch population.

== Integration and community ==
According to a publication by Harry van den Tillaart in 2000, the educational level of Afghan migrants in the country is relatively high. A high proportion of second generation Afghan immigrant pupils attended HAVO/VWO schools, 42 percent (by comparison, that of Turkish immigrant pupils was 22 percent). A 2004 study published by Statistics Netherlands (CBS) concluded that there were no major problems regarding integration of Afghans in the Netherlands. It concluded that:

Afghans residing in the Netherlands generally have a fairly Western world view, a liberal view of Islam, and know how to adjust to the Dutch society. The fact remains that the first generation still faces many problems, especially on the psychological level and to find suitable work. Their children are much better, according to the parents themselves. This is confirmed by the good results of the children in school.

Another study in 2017 found that Dutch Afghans (and Dutch Iranians) fared better in school than other foreign backgrounds and almost as well as native Dutch. 22% of Dutch Afghans finished a HBO or WO programme, which are the highest degrees in the Dutch education system, as of 2003.

Afghan migrants to the Netherlands have founded roughly 130 different associations, mostly aimed at maintaining Afghan culture in the Netherlands and providing charitable assistance—especially materials like blankets, food, and furniture—to people and non-governmental organisations in Afghanistan. Afghans form a relatively heterogeneous group both socially and ethnically, with representation of speakers of various languages of Afghanistan and representatives of various political factions in Afghanistan ranging from communists to democrats and Islamic activists; within organisations, most prefer to work with people of a similar background.

A 2003 study showed that Dutch Afghans feel less discriminated against compared to other minority groups. Additionally they were very positive about the prospects they get in the Netherlands, with only Dutch Yugoslavs having a higher rate according to the study. While those that are second generation immigrants have strongly identify with both Dutch and Afghan identities compared to the first generation, they remain attached to activities of Afghan origin, such as news of Afghanistan or listening to Afghan music.

=== Language ===
The Afghan community in the Netherlands often speak their native Dari or Pashto languages, although a report showed 75% of them say they speak Dutch fluently.

=== Labor ===
Afghans consider having a good job to be important, but since many do not achieve their desired occupation status, they feel frustrated and therefore accept lower qualified work. Statistics from 2009 show that there is a large number of entrepreneurs, 5.1% of Dutch Afghans, relatively high compared to other minority groups.

=== Health issues ===
Stress-related illnesses are common among migrants of Afghan background, due to a variety of causes including war, separation from relatives, and uncertainty about their future due to economic and residency permission issues. Differences in the health care systems of Afghanistan and the Netherlands have proven confusing to some refugees. The general practitioner plays a far more important role in the Dutch system. In contrast, in the Afghan system, patients often bypass their family doctor—or in rural areas, village herbalist—to consult specialists in urban areas directly. Mistrust of Dutch doctors is common, possibly stemming from Afghans migrants' general feeling of social exclusion.

== Notable individuals ==
- Anoush Dastgir
- Farshad Bashir
- Homaira Nakhat Dastgirzada
- Omran Haydary
- Siyar Bahadurzada

== See also ==
- Anti-Afghan sentiment
