= National Statistics and Information Authority =

Afghanistan's principal government institution in charge of statistics and census data

- Dari: اداره ملی احصائیه و معلومات; Pashto: د احصایې او معلوماتو ملي اداره

Agency overview
- Formed: 1972
- Jurisdiction: Constitution of Afghanistan
- Headquarters: District 7th, Chihlsetoon Road, Kabul, Afghanistan; 34.49687°N 69.15678°E
- Agency executive: Abdul Qahir Haji Edris, General Director
- Parent department: Ministry of Interior Affairs
- Website: nsia.gov.af

The National Statistics and Information Authority (NSIA, Dari: اداره ملی احصائیه و معلومات; Pashto: د احصایې او معلوماتو ملي اداره), formerly known by other names such the Central Statistics Office (Dari: ادارۀ مرکزی احصائیه; Pashto: د احصایې او معلوماتو ملي اداره), is a government agency in Afghanistan that collects and maintains the country's statistical data. It was established in 1972. Abdul Qahir Haji Edris serves as NSIA's General Director.

NSIA's Civil Registration and Foreign Nationals Registration Department is responsible for registering citizens of Afghanistan in its national database, and providing them with documents such as national ID cards, birth certificates, death certificates, marriage certificates, etc. NSIA has branches in all provinces of Afghanistan and in the United Arab Emirates but its main offices are in Kabul.

NSIA's Civil Registration and Foreign Nationals Registration Department also keeps records of all foreign travelers entering and leaving Afghanistan. The NSIA works closely with the nation's Ministry of Interior Affairs but is not a part of it.

== See also ==
- Afghan identity card
- Afghan Post
