= Afghans in Iran =

افغان‌ها در ایران

Total population
- c. 4.4 million (2025 estimate)

Regions with significant populations
- Tehran province, Khorasan Razavi province, Qom province, Isfahan province, Kerman province, Fars province

Languages
- Dari (Persian), Pashto, Uzbek, Turkmen, and other languages of Afghanistan

Religion
- Islam (Shia and Sunni)

Afghans in Iran (Note: Persian: افغانستانی‌ها در ایران, romanized: Afghânestânihâ dar Irân, pronounced [ʔæfˌɢɒːnesˌtʰɒːniːˈhɒː dæɹ ʔiːˈɹɒːn]; Dari: افغانی‌ها در ایران, romanized: Afǧānīhā dar Īrān, cyrillized: Афғониҳо дар Эрон, pronounced [ʔɐvˌɣɑːnɪˈhɑː daɾ ʔiːˈɾɑːn]; Pashto: په ایران کې افغانان, romanized: pə Irān ke Afǧānān, pronounced [pə ʔiˈrɑn ke ʔɐvɣɑˈnɑn]; Turkmen: ايرانداقى افغانلار, romanized: Eýrandaky afganlar, cyrillized: Эйрандакы афганлар, pronounced [ejˌɾɑndɑˈqɯ ɑβʁɑnˈɫɑɾ]) are citizens of Afghanistan who are temporarily residing in Iran as refugees or asylum seekers. They form the largest percent of the Afghan diaspora. The first wave of Afghans crossed into Iran after the start of the Soviet–Afghan War in 1979.

According to Afghanistan's Ministry of Refugees and Repatriation and the United Nations High Commissioner for Refugees (UNHCR), there were approximately three million Afghan citizens in Iran as of January 2023, most of whom were born and raised in Iran during the last four decades. They are under the care and protection of the UNHCR, and are provided time-limited legal status by Iran's Bureau of Aliens and Foreign Immigrant Affairs, without a path to obtain permanent residency. There are also about 600,000 Afghan tourists, travelers, merchants, exchanged students, regular or irregular migrant workers, and others. According to Hassan Kazemi Qomi, half of Iran's foreign investors are Afghans.

There have been widespread reports of Iranian mistreatment of Afghan migrants and their human rights, and the community is very marginalized. In 2006, about 146,387 undocumented Afghans were deported. Many more continue to experience such events. In 2010, six Afghan prisoners were executed by hanging in the streets of Iran, which sparked angry demonstrations in Afghanistan. In August 2024 Iran ordered all undocumented Afghan citizens to return to their country before a one-year deadline. As of October 2025, around 4.5 million Afghans still remain in Iran.

== Political history and migration ==
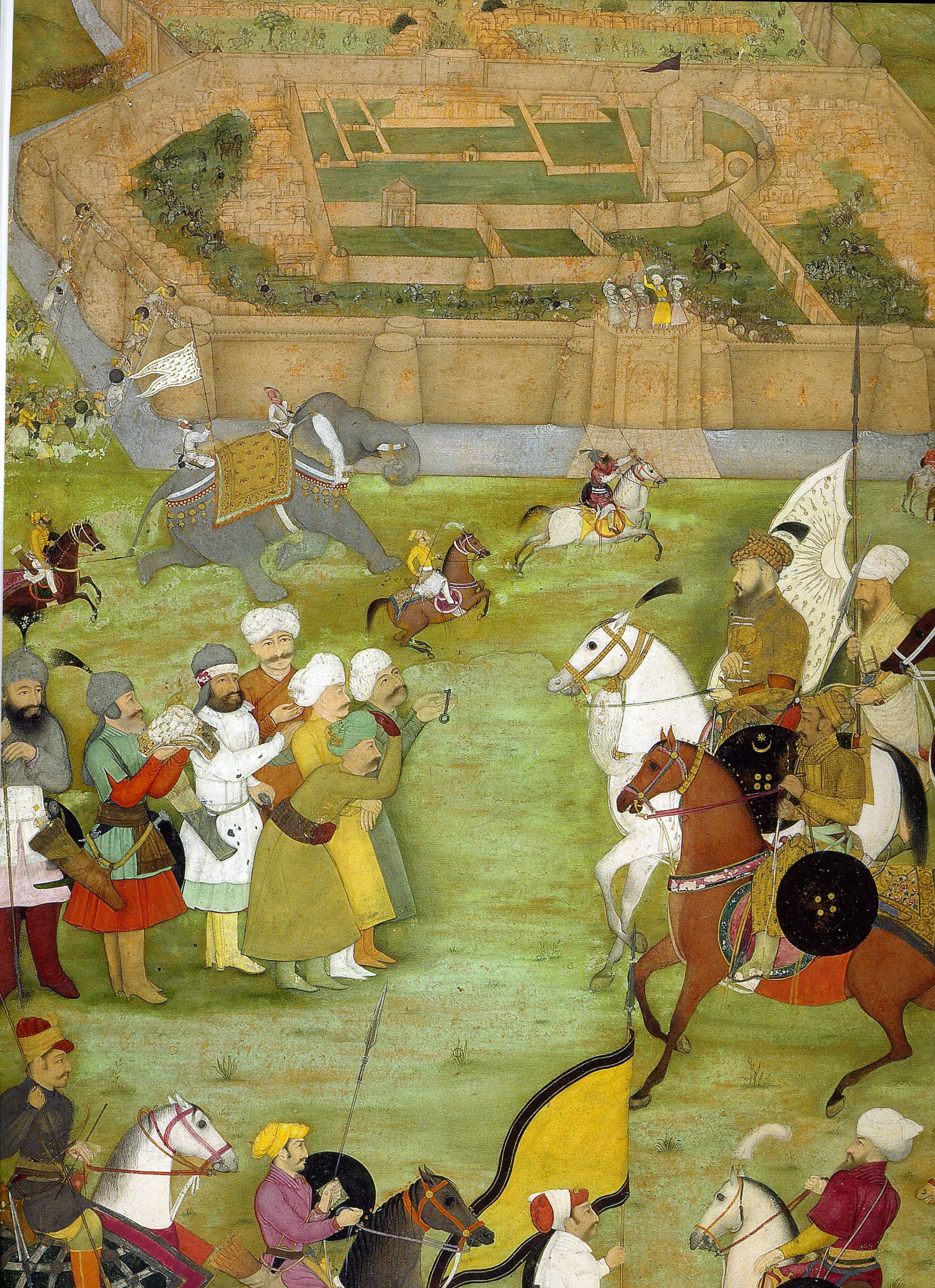
A miniature from Padshahnama depicting the surrender of the Persian Safavid garrison of Kandahar in 1638 to the Mughals, which was re-taken by the Persians in 1650 during the Mughal-Safavid war.

As neighboring countries with cultural ties, there has been a long history of population movements between Iran and Afghanistan. Southern Afghanistan was contested between the Persian Safavid dynasty and the Moghuls of India until 1709 when Mir Wais Hotak, founder of the Hotaki dynasty, declared it independent. During the reign of Nader Shah, the brother of Ahmad Shah Durrani was made Governor of Mazandaran province. A few years after Nader Shah's death, Durrani and his Afghan army made Nader's grandson Shahrokh Afshar, ruler of the small remaining Afshar territory comprising the Khorasan and Kohistan provinces of Iran, their vassal for some years . The region remained a vassal territory of the Afghan Empire until Durrani's death. During the early 19th century, the Persian army invaded Herat several times but with British assistance the Afghans quickly expelled them. Communities made up of 2,000 and 5,000 households of ethnic Hazaras were formed in Torbat-e Jam and Bakharz in Iran. The 1857 Treaty of Paris ended hostilities of the Anglo-Persian War. The modern day Afghan–Iranian border gradually began to take shape in the second half of the 19th century.

Afghan migrant workers, pilgrims and merchants, who settled in Iran over the years, had by the early 20th century, become large enough to be officially classified as their own ethnic group, referred to variously as Khavari or Barbari. Young Hazara men have embraced migrant work in Iran and other Persian Gulf states to save money for marriage and become independent; such work has even come to be seen as a "rite of passage". Such migration intensified in the early 1970s due to famine, and by 1978, there were an estimated several hundred thousand Afghan migrant workers in Iran.

The Soviet–Afghan War, which erupted in 1979, was the beginning of a series of major waves of refugee flight from Afghanistan. Those who came to Iran often augmented the ranks of migrant workers already there. The new Islamic Republic took place around the same time as the influx of masses of Afghan migrants to other countries, fleeing the plagues of problems in their own country. Iran started recognising those Afghans listed as migrants workers or refugees as legals. They issued them "blue cards" to denote their status, entitling them to free primary and secondary education, as well as subsidised healthcare and food. However, the government maintained some restrictions on their employment, namely prohibiting them from owning their own businesses or working as street vendors.

Most of the early academic attention on these new immigrants was focused on Afghan refugees in Pakistan. Studies on Afghans in Iran came later due to the political situation during the Iran–Iraq War. By 1992, a report by the United Nations High Commissioner for Refugees (UNHCR) estimated that there were around 2.8 million Afghans in Iran. Just 10% were housed in refugee camps; most settled in or near urban areas. For their efforts in housing and educating these refugees and illegals, the Iranian government received little financial aid from the international community. With the fall of the Najibullah government of Afghanistan in 1992, Iran began efforts to encourage refugees to repatriate. During these years, there were many reports of cases of Afghans being harassed by Iranian law enforcement officers. Legal residents had their identity cards confiscated and exchanged with temporary residency permits of one-month validity, at the expiry of which they were expected to have left Iran and have repatriated.

=== 21st century ===
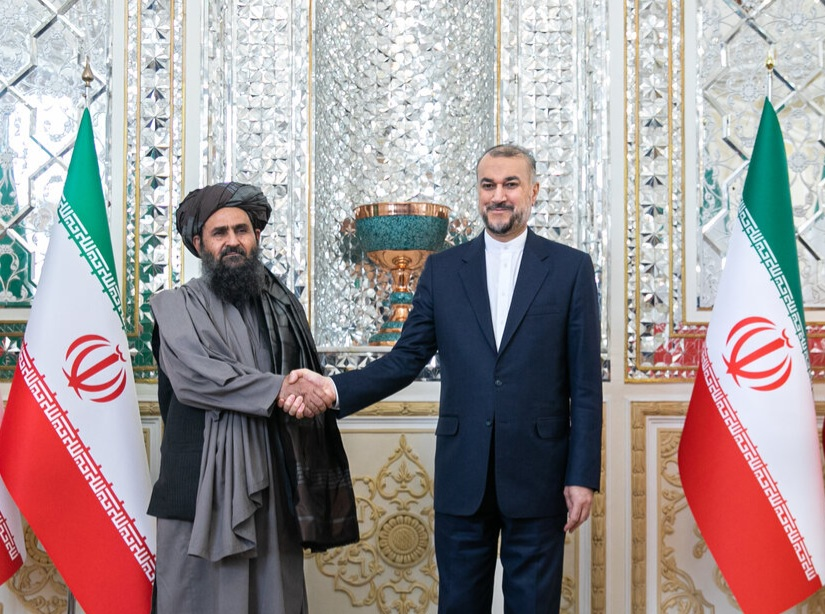
Abdul Ghani Baradar (left) and Hossein Amir-Abdollahian (right) in 2023

Since 2002, millions of Afghan citizens living in Iran and Pakistan have returned to Afghanistan. In 2012, around 173,000 of them were forcefully returned. Over 103,086 more were deported in 2013. Many of the deportees complained of torture and other abuses by Iranian authorities. In October 2020 there were 780,000 registered citizens of Afghanistan residing in Iran. Most of these were born and raised in Iran during the last four decades. In 2015, Abdolreza Rahmani Fazli stated that 2.5 million Afghans resided in Iran, which includes the registered and illegals as well as those who were admitted to the country with Afghan passports and Iranian visas. Over 600,000 Afghans living in Iran have returned to Afghanistan in 2022. Afghanistan's Ministry of Refugees and Repatriation has acknowledged that approximately 3 million Afghan citizens still remain in Iran.

In May 2025 Iranian Interior Minister ordered deportations of more than four million immigrants until no later than June 2025. It has been reported that some of the deportees were treated like livestock or slaves.

In 2025, around 1.5 million left Iran and returned to Afghanistan. Media reports indicate that even those with valid visas and documentation have been forcibly deported. As of October 2025, around 4.5 million Afghans still remain in Iran according to UNHCR and Iranian government. They are expected to leave Iran in the near future.

Due to the 2026 Iran war, thousands of Afghans have fled Iran back to Afghanistan, with around 2,000 Afghans crossing the border every day as of March 2026.

== Social and legal issues ==
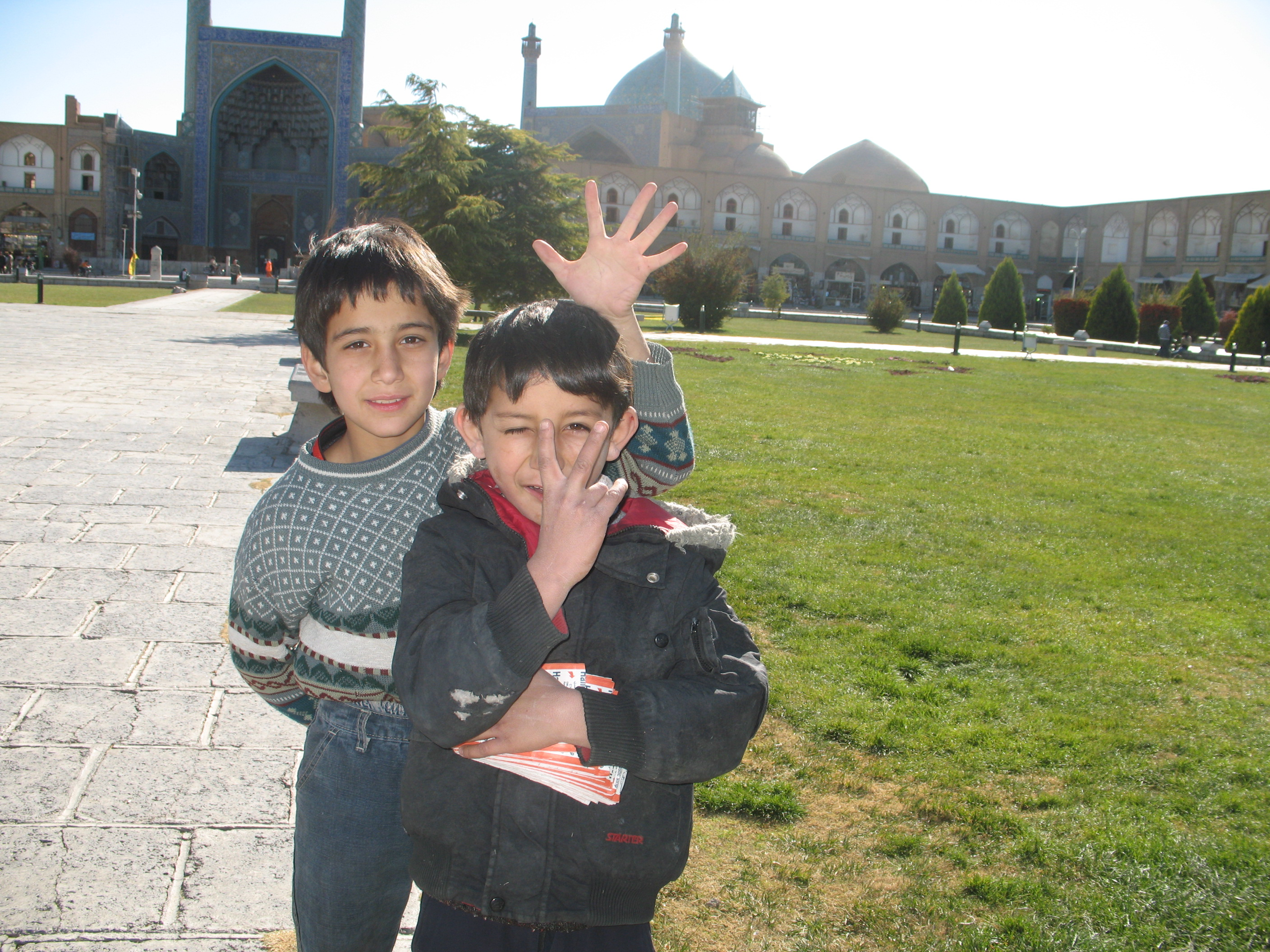
Afghan children at Naqsh-e Jahan Square in Esfahan, Iran. (2007)

Afghan refugees have come to Iran since the 1980s, including children and adolescents. Many were born in Iran over the last 30 years but were unable to gain citizenship due to Iranian immigration laws. The refugees include Hazaras, Tajiks, Qizilbash, Pashtuns, and other ethnic groups of Afghanistan. One UNHCR paper claims that nearly half the documented refugees are Hazara, a primarily Shi'a group.

In Afghanistan, some people feel that using birth control violates the tenets of their religion; however, in Iran, attitudes are far different, due to the country's extensive promotion of family planning. Afghans in Iran have moved closer to mainstream Iranian values in this regard; the Iranian influence has even filtered back into Afghanistan. One study in Khorasan has found that while overall fertility rates for Afghan migrant women are somewhat higher than those for Iranian women there—3.9 vs. 3.6—the similarity hides significant age-related differences in fertility, with older Afghan migrant women having a far higher number of children than older Iranian urban women, while younger Afghan migrant women's number of children appears to be approaching the far-lower Iranian urban norm. Contraceptive usage among the same study group was 55%, higher than for local Iranian women.

More broadly, the same conservative men who resisted aggressive attempts by communist governments in Afghanistan to expand women's education and their role in the economy are now faced with the very changes from which they had hoped to shield their families. This shift in family and gender roles was induced by the experience of living as refugees in a largely Muslim society.

Some Afghan men married Iranian women during their residence in Iran; however, under Iranian nationality law, the children of such marriages are not recognized as Iranian citizens, and it is also more difficult for the men to gain Iranian citizenship than for Afghan women married to Iranian men. As of 2019 this law has changed and Iranian women in mixed marriages can transfer their Iranian nationality to their children, regardless of the nationality of the child's father.

Although Iranian authorities have made efforts to educate Afghan children, Human Rights Watch reports that many undocumented Afghan children face bureaucratic obstacles that prevent their children from attending school, in violation of international law. Iranian law limits Afghans who have permission as refugees to work to a limited number of dangerous and poorly paid manual labor jobs, regardless of their education and skills.

=== Marriage with indigenous people ===
According to statistics released in the year 1995, nearly 24,000 marriages of Iranian nationals have been recorded in Iran, and it is anticipated that nearly the same amount of legal marriage has been recorded. According to Article 1060 of the Civil Code of Iran, the marriage of Iranian women to foreign men with the permission of the government and any foreigner who, without the permission referred to above, will marry an Iranian woman, will be sentenced to one year's imprisonment of up to three years. And the government's important marriages are prohibited. Under Iranian law, Afghan women who marry men in Iran are considered citizens of Iran under Article 976 of the Civil Code and can take Iranian citizenship and their children enjoy the conditions of an Iranian citizen, but if Afghan men marry Iranian women to men Citizenship of Iran does not belong and according to Article 979 of the Civil Code they can only apply for citizenship. Children from foreign marriages with Iranian women up to 18 years of age are considered to be their fathers, and if their fathers lack a degree of residence, they will encounter limitations for people without a degree in Iran. These children can apply for citizenship at the age of 18 years.

In 2020, a new policy allowing Iranian women to pass down their citizenship to their children at birth started to effect. As of mid-November, about 75,000 people had applied for citizenship under the new law, while 120 thousand children were born to Iranian fathers and Afghan mothers and already had citizenship.

The new policy particularly affects the children of Iranian women who have married Afghan men. While Iran's nationality laws predate the 1979 Islamic revolution, Mohsen Kazempour, a co-founder of the Datikan Legal Institute in Tehran, said the current bias against foreigners is in part rooted in a nationalist hysteria that followed the revolution and the eight-year war between Iran and Iraq. "Iran was at war with Iraq, and Iraq was supported by many foreign nations," he said. "So the Iranian government was very concerned about the penetration of secret agents in the government or army."

=== Torture, persecution and deprivation of rights ===
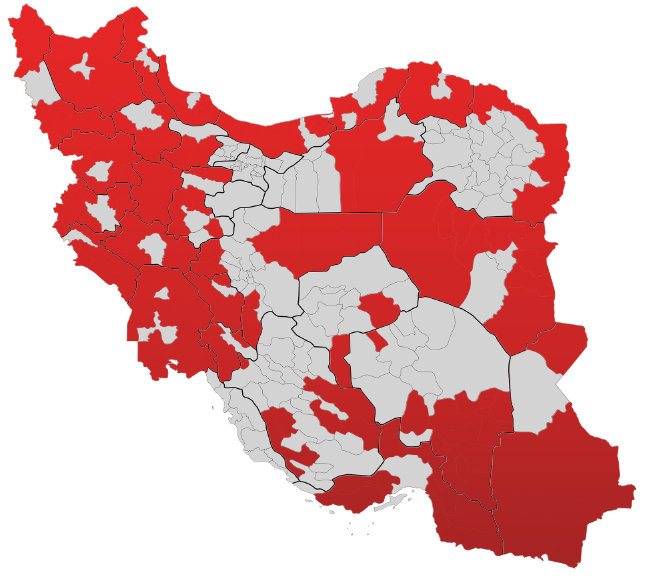
The red areas here are where Afghan citizens do not have freedom of movement or allowed to reside there.

Iran is not a signatory to the United Nations Convention Against Torture. This makes Afghans vulnerable to torture in that country. Violence and racism against them has been steadily increasing in the last two decades. It was reported in May 2020 that up to 50 Afghan migrants who crossed into Iran illegally were beaten and thrown in a river, of which half did not survive, while in another incident Iranian forces shot at a vehicle carrying Afghans, resulting in three deaths. These incidents led to protests in Afghanistan. The Iranian government has also failed to take necessary steps to protect its Afghan population from physical violence linked to rising anti-refugee sentiment in Iran, or to hold those responsible accountable.

According to legal experts, Afghan migrants in Iran often face many vulnerabilities due to residency issues, economic hardship, and limited access to independent lawyers. The judicial cases involving Afghan migrants in Iran, has remained a major concern for human rights activists who call for fair legal treatment and as well as transparency in cases transparency.

According to recent statistics, a total of 5,399 foreign nationals were in Iranian prisons. Of this, 2,240 had been convicted of drug related offences, 1,323 of theft and 989 of battery or assault. It was reported in 2010 that around 3,000 Afghan prisoners faced the death penalty in Iran. A number of them have been executed by hanging in the last decade. Iran imposes the death penalty even for minor drug-related offenses, such as possession of only 30 grams of amphetamines. Afghans nationals are completely prohibited in 15 provinces, and partially prohibited in the other 12 provinces. The Iranian government decided to restrict the presence of Afghan citizens in the provinces via provincial executive orders.

According to Hengaw, a human rights advocacy organization, at least 85 Afghan citizens were executed in Iran in the year 2025. In February 2026, an Afghan national, identified as Ahmad Farhad Haidari who was originally from Afghanistan's Herat province, had been sentenced to death in a murder case under Iran's Qisas law. Capital punishment in Iran, particularly in cases involving foreign nationals and migrant communities, has been frequently criticized by human rights organizations.

== Economy ==
According to Hassan Kazemi Qomi, half of Iran's foreign investors are Afghans. With a population of 2 million, they have about 10% of the labor market in Iran. Their presence has led to protests by Iranian workers. The Iranian government has also imposed a number of restrictions, including the ban on the use of foreign workers in governmental and non-governmental organizations, and called on all government agencies, non-state actors, companies and contractors to provide their needed labor to Iranian workforce, with numerous penalties, including imprisonment and a fine for the offending employers. However, many employers prefer to hire Afghans due their low wage expectations, lack of insurance requirements, and their high productivity.

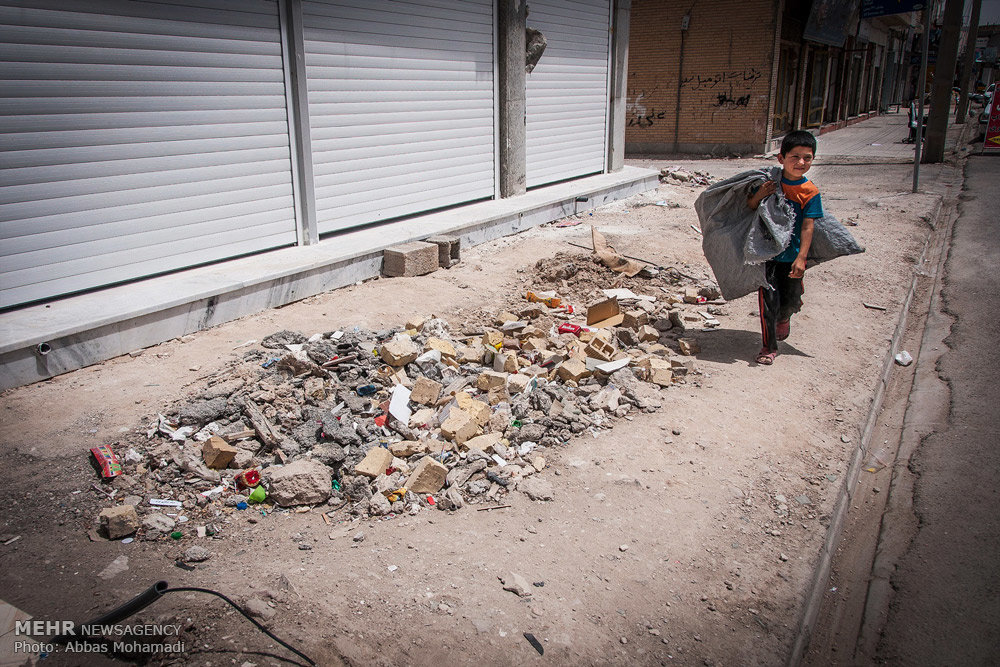
Six year old Afghan child laborer in Iran.

== Used as proxies ==
Iran's Revolutionary Guards Corps (IRGC) has recruited and coerced thousands of undocumented Afghans living in the Islamic Republic to fight in Syria since at least November 2013. The Islamic Republic has urged the Afghan refugees to defend Shia sacred sites and offered financial incentives to encourage them to join pro-Syrian government militias.

The men, who are mainly ethnic Hazaras, are recruited from impoverished and vulnerable Afghan migrant communities in Iran, and sent to join a multi-national Shia Muslim militia – in effect a "Foreign Legion" – that Iran has mobilised to support Syrian President Bashar al-Assad. They are drafted into the (Liwa Fatemiyoun) Fatemiyoun Brigade, an all-Afghan unit commanded by Revolutionary Guards officers. Their training is very short – a fortnight of tactical movement and basic weapons handling – all conducted in strict secrecy.

According to Amir Toumaj, a researcher with the Foundation for Defense of Democracies, by 2016, the Fatemiyoun was upgraded from a Brigade (called "Liwa" in Arabic and "Tyip" in Persian), which normally numbers from 3,000 to 10,000, to a Division (called "Firqat" in Arabic and "Lashkar" in Persian), which normally numbers from 10,000 to 20,000.

According to Zohair Mojahed, a cultural official in the Fatemiyoun Brigade, the group suffered 2,000 killed and 8,000 wounded up to the end of 2017 while fighting in Syria. A minimum of 925 deaths among the brigade's troops were documented based on monitoring of open source coverage of funeral services, but these burials do not take into account the bodies abandoned on the ground, executed prisoners bu opposing forces, missing fighters, etc.

It was reported in 2019 that as many as 50,000 Afghans in total had fought in Liwa Fatemiyoun, up until then.

Iranian terminology for those killed in Syria is "defenders of the holy shrine". The Abolfazli mosque in eastern Mashhad's Golshahr district – situated at the heart of an impoverished area accommodating most of the city's Afghans – is the place where the refugees, usually young men, sign up on a daily basis to go and fight for Iran in Syria.

Human rights groups have described Tehran's use of Afghans and other foreign fighters as a tactic to save Iranian lives and mute domestic criticism of its involvement in a messy and destructive foreign conflict. Some groups said that boys as young as 13 have been induced to fight and that recruits received brief training and often suffered heavy casualties.

=== Recruitment and use of child soldiers ===
While most recruited fighters of Fatmiyoun tend to be in their 20's and 30's, according to Human Rights Watch and Amnesty International, Liwa Fatemiyoun has recruited child soldiers, some of whom were as young as 14. According to reports, many children have fought in Fatemiyoun and many have also been killed. Liwa Fatemiyoun has also glorified children, who fought and died serving and fighting for the group in Syria, as martyrs.

According to official Iranian sources, the first "martyr" of the Fatemiyoun brigade was Reza Ismaili. He was deployed to Syria and the age of just 17 and was killed in action two years later at the age of 19.

Human Rights Watch identified and published images of the tombstones of Fatemiyoun soldiers killed in the Syrian war and buried in Iran in 2017. At the time of their deaths, many of fighters buried were between the ages of 14 and 17.

== Demography ==
=== Ethnicity ===
The ethnic composition of Afghan refugees in Iran has shifted notably over time. Data from 2001 paint a picture of the broader Afghan migrant population at the time; Tajiks formed the largest group at 20.22 percent, ahead of Hazaras at 18.66 percent and Pashtuns at 6.63 percent.

By 2006, detailed demographic data from the Amayesh registration process offered a clearer picture for the first time. Hazaras had become the largest ethnic group at 39–47 percent across different counts, followed by Tajiks at 22–30 percent and Pashtuns at 9–13 percent, with the remainder split among smaller communities such as Sadat, Baluch, Turkmen, and Uzbeks. Notably, the Hazara share had risen by 6 percent since early 2004, suggesting they were the ethnic group most reluctant to repatriate. These figures should nonetheless be treated with caution, as ethnic classification was based on self-declaration, and roughly 10 percent of respondents identified only by subtribe rather than by one of the major ethnic categories, meaning the actual shares of all groups are likely somewhat higher than recorded.

Among the 29,345 Afghan refugees who arrived following the Taliban takeover in 2021, Hazaras again constituted the largest share at 40 percent, followed by Tajiks at 36 percent, Pashtuns at 8 percent, and Uzbeks at 2.41 percent.

However, these national figures obscure significant regional variation. In Yazd province, for instance, the 2022 census recorded a strikingly different distribution, with Pashtuns forming the clear majority at 56 percent, followed by Tajiks at 27.2 percent, while Hazaras accounted for only 4.46 percent, which is the inverse of the national pattern.

=== Religious sect ===
In 2001, the sectarian split among Afghan migrants was nearly even, with Sunnis at 52.49 percent and Shia at 47.38 percent. By 2016, however, the deputy director of the General Directorate for Foreign Affairs estimated that approximately 70 percent of foreign nationals living in Iran were Shia Muslims and 30 percent Sunni Muslims, a notable shift from the near-even split recorded fifteen years earlier.

=== Gender composition ===
Based on the 2016 Iranian census, 845,267 (53%) of the Afghan national population in Iran were men and 738,712 (47%) women.

Gender Combination of Afghan Refugees in Iranian Provinces (2016)
Province	Population by gender		Province	Population by gender		Province	Population by gender	
Province	Man	Female	Province	Man	Female	Province	Man	Female
East Azarbaijan	76	63	North Khorasan	55	38	Kohgiluyeh and Boyer-Ahmad	896	607
Western Azerbaijan	52	55	Khuzestan	3671	2619	Golestan	9602	8671
Ardebil	15	20	Zanjan	23	17	Gilan	218	91
Isfahan	94773	88351	Semnan	18535	16874	Lorestan	63	36
Alborz	45548	38773	Sistan and Baluchestan	14163	12683	Mazandaran	1818	805
Ilam	12	17	Fars	61198	48049	Markazi	15290	13967
Bushehr	19386	10305	Qazvin	9592	8809	Hormozgan	14301	9894
Tehran	274780	240787	Qom	48759	47608	Hamedan	135	82
Chaharmahal va Bakhtiari	60	31	Kurdistan	13	5	Yazd	28286	23457
southern Khorasan	2619	2426	Kerman	69906	55505	Yazd	28286	23457
Khorasan Razavi	111396	108046	Kermanshah	26	21	Yazd	28286	23457

=== Age ===
Based on the 2016 census, about 46% were under 20 years old and about 67% were under the 30 years old. Given the 40-year presence history, many of them were born in Iran. The Afghan refugee population were younger than the indigenous population of Iran (31% of Iranians were under the age 20, and 49% of Iranians were under the age of 30). One of the main reason is the high birth rates and the low age of marriage in this population.

Population by age category
Age group	Population			Age group	Population		
Age group	Man	Female	Total	Age group	Man	Female	Total
0–4	90124	85204	175328	40–44	44077	33566	77643
5–9	98288	93099	191387	45–49	34883	27983	62866
10–14	94779	88976	183755	50–54	30474	22329	52803
15–19	89901	83179	173080	55–59	20672	14036	34708
20–24	93028	86973	180001	60–64	16387	9746	26133
25–29	85796	76279	162075	65–69	9436	5626	15062
30–34	66179	55252	121431	70–74	6589	3826	10415
35–39	56910	48545	105455	75+	7744	4093	11837

=== Distribution ===
Residence of Afghan refugees is prohibited in 15 provinces of Iran, except in the other three provinces of Qom, Alborz, Tehran (except Khojir, district 13), in the rest of the provinces, they only have the right to reside in some cities. Fatemeh Ashrafi, the reason for the restrictions on the movement of Afghan refugees in Iran, allowed the Iranian government, in accordance with the 1951 Convention, to protect refugees from limiting the displacement of foreign immigrants in their country based on national interests and security issues. ^{[11]}

Distribution of Afghans in provinces of Iran (2016)
Province	Population	Province	Population	Province	Population
Tehran	515,567	Sistan and Baluchestan	26,846	Western Azerbaijan	107
Khorasan Razavi	219,442	Hormozgan	24,195	Lorestan	99
Isfahan	183,124	Qazvin	18,401	North Khorasan	93
Kerman	125,411	Golestan	18,273	Chaharmahal va Bakhtiari	91
Fars	109,247	Khuzestan	6,290	Kermanshah	47
Qom	96,367	southern Khorasan	5,045	Zanjan	40
Alborz	84,321	Mazandaran	2,623	Ardebil	35
Yazd	51,743	Kohgiluyeh and Boyer-Ahmad	1,503	Ilam	29
Semnan	35,409	Gilan	309	Kurdistan	18
Bushehr	29,691	Hamedan	217	Kurdistan	18
Markazi	29,257	East Azarbaijan	139	Kurdistan	18

== Health and education ==
According to Tehran Times, 120,000 Afghans in Iran have health insurance. Over 40,000 of them are enrolled in Iranian schools and universities. Their education in Iran is free.

== Repatriation and deportation ==
Every year large number of Afghans return to Afghanistan from neighboring Iran and Pakistan. Some are deported for overstaying or getting in trouble with the law.

Statistics on the return of Afghan refugees
	2002	2003	2004	2005	2006	2007	2008	2009	2010	2011	2012	2013	2014	2015	2016
Voluntary repatriation	117,364	124,615	74,967	225,815	238,384	155,721	74,773	---	---	---	279,012	217,483	286,226	316,415	248,764
Forced deportation	42,360	53,897	79,410	95,845	146,387	363,369	406,524	322,008	286,662	211,023	250,731	220,846	218,565	227,601	194,764
Total	159,724	178,512	154,377	321,660	384,771	519,090	481,297	---	---	---	529,743	438,329	504,791	544,016	443,763

== In popular culture ==
Since the 1980s, a number of Iranian movies set in Iran have featured Afghan immigrant characters. One early example is Mohsen Makhmalbaf's 1988 movie The Cyclist, in which the character of the title, a former cycling champion of Afghanistan, gives a demonstration in his town's square whereby he rides his bicycle without stopping for seven days and seven nights, with the aim of raising money for life-saving surgery for his wife. In the end, even after seven days, he continues to pedal endlessly, too fatigued to hear his son's pleas to get off his bicycle. One scholar analyses the film as an allegory which parallels the exploitation that Afghan refugees suffer from in Iran and from which they are unable to escape.

Other notable films with Afghan characters include Jafar Panahi's 1996 The White Balloon, Abbas Kiarostami's 1997 A Taste of Cherry, Majid Majidi's 2000 Baran, and Bahram Bayzai's 2001 Sagkoshi.

== Notable people ==
- Jalaleddin Farsi, former candidate for the presidency of Iran
- Fereshteh Hosseini
- Adela Mohseni, women's rights activist
- Setayesh Qorayshi

== See also ==
- Afghanistan–Iran relations
- Anti-Afghan sentiment
- Liwa Fatemiyoun
- 2025 Afghan deportation from Iran
