= Homaira Nakhat Dastgirzada =

Afghan poet (1960–2020)

Homaira Nakhat Dastgirzada حمیرا نکهت دستگیرزاده
- Born: 17 May 1960 (26/27 Sowr 1339); Kabul, Afghanistan
- Died: 4 September 2020 (aged 60); Utrecht, Netherlands
- Education: Kabul University; Sofia University
- Known for: Poetry

Homaira Nakhat Dastgirzada (Persian:حمیرا نکهت دستگیرزاده) (17 May 1960 - 4 September 2020), best known as Nakhat, was a well known Afghan poet. She wrote numerous pieces of Persian poetry that were "very lyrical, with a lot of imagery." Dastgirzada was nicknamed the Blue Poet of Afghanistan (شاعر آبی افغانستان)

== Biography ==
Homaira Nakhat Dastgirzada was born at Masturat Hospital in Kabul. Her mother was from Herat, historically one of the great centers of Persian literary and artistic production. Dastgirzada started writing poems aged twelve, which would later be published in magazines. She would eventually produce literary and artistic programs for Afghan National Radio and Television in 1983. She achieved a doctorate in Persian literature at the University of Sofia, Bulgaria. She played a key role in establishing a literary program for students in universities and schools in Kabul, and was a well-known public figure.

She married in 1982 and has two children, Hariwa and Hajir. After the hardline Taliban took power in Afghanistan in 1996, Dastgirzada secretly set up a women's poetry club in Kabul. She moved to the Netherlands in 1999, where she settled with her family in the city of Utrecht and co-founded the Association of Afghan Writers and Poets in Exile with other Dutch Afghan artists.

== Poetry style ==
Dastgirzada wrote in a wide range of poetic styles, including ghazal, rubāʿī, Mathnawi, She'r-e Nimaa'i, and she'r-i sapid (blank verse). Her early work drew on the classical traditions of Rumi and Hafez while also engaging with the Persian modernist form pioneered by Nima Yooshij. Literary critic Partaw Naderi noted that Dastgirzada's first collection, The Blue River of Freedom, already showed her moving between the traditions of Hafez and Rumi and the modernist forms of Persian poetry. Dastgirzada wrote about various topics including social issues, injustice, motherhood, nostalgia of Afghanistan, and new found discoveries in the Netherlands. A number of her works have been translated and published into Dutch.

Many of her works also broke taboos and gave energy to Afghan women and poets.

== Death ==
Dastgirzada died from cancer on 4 September 2020. Four days later, her funeral was held in Utrecht attended by 200 people. Then-President of Afghanistan, Ashraf Ghani, called her death an " irreparable loss to the cultural and literary community."

She loved to talk about literature and poetry for hours, even when she was already ill. Then when we asked, 'Don't you sleep,' she said, 'Someday we will sleep very long and very deeply. Let's enjoy this moment now.'

— Parwez Khorsand, musician friend

== Published works ==
Fifteen collections of poetry were published (one posthumously).

A list of selected published works by Dastgirzada:

- Blue River of Freedom شط آبی رهایی (1990)
- Alien Ghazal of Exile غزل غریب غربت (2003)
- Around Fire and Regret به دور آتش و دریغ (2004)
- The Wandering Sun آفتاب آواره (2009)
- Nothing can be said in 50 years هیچ نتوان گفت در ۵۰ سال (2011)
- The bright alleys of the Netherlands کوچه های روشن ماه هالند (2011)
- Bitter in Fire تلخ در آتش (2012)
- Awash With Dawn ازسپیده لبریز (2013)
- Fantasy butterflies (2014) هستند
- Freedom
- The City Is lonely
