= Afghan identity card =

National identity card of Afghanistan

Afghan Tazkira (Dari: تذکره تابعیت) (Pashto: د تابعیت تذکره)
- Type: National identity card
- Issued by: Afghanistan
- Purpose: Identification
- Eligibility: Citizen of Afghanistan

The Afghan Tazkira (Dari: تذکره تابعیت; Pashto: د تابعیت تذکره) is an official national identity document issued to every citizen of Afghanistan, which includes the Afghan diaspora around the world.

The document is used to obtain an electronic Afghan identity card (e-Tazkira), which is valid for up to 10 years and required for many things such as employment, registering in school, operating a business, buying or renting a house, opening a bank account, sending or receiving money through Western Union, purchasing a SIM card, obtaining a passport, booking airline tickets, staying in hotels, etc. The documents serve as proof of identity and residency but more importantly Afghan nationality. Both the Tazkira certificate and e-Tazkira are issued by the National Statistics and Information Authority (NSIA), which is headquartered in Kabul but has offices by the name of Asan Khedmat (Easy Services) in various provinces of Afghanistan.

The Afghan Tazkira, which is older than 100 years, has been modernized in recent years. The e-Tazkira campaign was officially launched in May of 2018 when then-President Ashraf Ghani and First Lady Rula Ghani received their smart cards. Distribution of the cards soon began in Kabul and later in other provinces of the country. The e-Tazkira complies with international standards for identity documents. As of October 2025, over sixteen million people of Afghanistan have obtained their e-Tazkiras. This includes the Afghans residing in Iran and the United Arab Emirates (UAE).

== Procedure ==
To obtain a Tazkira, an application must be filed with the NSIA. The processing fee is between 500 and 700 afghanis (around $10 USD). Overseas Afghans are required to pay between $50 USD and $150 USD. The Tazkira certificate and e-Tazkira are both issued by the NSIA. Factual evidence regarding the applicant being a national and citizen of Afghanistan is required. This can be done by providing older Afghan Tazkiras along with family and relatives appearing as witnesses, and they each must also have a valid e-Tazkira or a valid Afghan passport. Applicants below the age of 18 years must be accompanied by their parents or legal guardians before the application can be submitted. The e-Tazkira can only be issued after the entire verification and biometrics process is completed. In some cases this requires multiple trips to the NSIA.

== Characteristics of e-Tazkira ==
The e-Tazkira is a polycarbonate smart card, about 86 × 54 millimeters in size. On the front is the bearer's photo along with personal information, which is in Dari and Pashto languages. On the back is a gold-plated contact chip, and to the right is the bearer's smaller photo, with some of the bearer's personal information in English.

At the top of the current e-Tazkira is written the following:

1. Islamic Republic of Afghanistan (Dari: جمهوری اسلامی افغانستان; Pashto: د افغانستان اسلامي جمهوریت)
2. National Statistics and Information Authority (Dari: اداره ملی احصائیه و معلومات; Pashto: د احصایې او معلوماتو ملي اداره)
3. Citizenship ID (Dari: تذکره تابعیت; Pashto: د تابعیت تذکره)

=== Printed data ===
The descriptions of the fields on the e-Tazkira are printed in Dari, Pashto, and English language, and include the following personal information:

- National identification number (13 digits as follows: 0000-0000-00000)
- Given name (with surname in quotation marks on the front and in capital letters on the back)
- Father's full name
- Grandfather's full name
- Date of birth
- Date of issue
- Date of expiry (up to 10 years)
- Place of birth
- Place of origin
- Place of current residence
- Religion
- Nationality
- Ethnicity
- Gender
- Holder's signature (optional)

A machine readable zone is printed on the bottom of the back-side of the card.

== See also ==
- Afghan passport
- Afghan nationality law
- List of national identity card policies by country
