= Afghans in Russia =

Total population
- 150,000 (estimate)

Regions with significant populations
- Moscow

Languages
- Dari, Pashto, Russian, Turkmen

Afghans in Russia are part of the larger Afghan diaspora around the world. They are citizens of Afghanistan residing in Russia. Their total estimated population was around 150,000 individuals in late 2017. They include refugees and asylum seekers. A third of the population lives in Moscow, and the largest community is found around the Sevastopol Hotel, which is home to thousands of Afghan residents and many Afghan-run businesses.

In 2007 the UNHCR reported many, including children of officials who worked for the Democratic Republic of Afghanistan during the 1980s, who have failed to gain refugee status. Refugee status approval rate had been between 2% and 5% and about 30% for temporary asylum applications. Many Afghans had entered Russia through Uzbekistan and Tajikistan, and were blocked from making refugee application under the “safe third country” rule. Between 1997 and end of 2007, only 844 Afghans were granted refugee status in Russia. Between 2002 and 2007, only 548 Afghans were voluntarily repatriated from Russia with the help of UNHCR.

In 2021, the Russian government requested that 1,000 Afghans be allowed to fly from Afghanistan to Russia following the 2021 Taliban offensive.

== See also ==
- Afghanistan–Russia relations

== Notable people ==
- Said Karimulla Khalili
- Annet Mahendru
