= Afghans in Tajikistan =

Total population
- c. 11,800

Regions with significant populations
- Dushanbe, Vahdat

Languages
- Dari, Pashto, Uzbek, Russian, and other languages of Afghanistan

Afghans in Tajikistan are part of the larger Afghan diaspora around the world. They are citizens of Afghanistan residing in Tajikistan on a temporary basis, some of whom are refugees and asylum seekers registered with the United Nations High Commissioner for Refugees (UNHCR). They form the majority of all refugees in Tajikistan.

== Migration history ==
UNHCR statistics on Afghan refugee in Tajikistan
Year	Number
1994	695
1995	620
1996	1,161
1997	2,164
1998	3,622
1999	4,531
2000	15,354
2001	15,336
2002	3,427
2004	3,000
2010	7,000
2025	11,800
Includes refugees on Panj River islands

Tajikistan first passed a law on refugees in 1994, bringing them into partial compliance with the 1951 Convention Relating to the Status of Refugees and the 1967 Protocol which amended it. However, during the 1990s, few Afghan refugees chose Tajikistan as their destination; most were people associated with Mohammad Najibullah's fallen Democratic Republic of Afghanistan and Republic of Afghanistan administrations. Aside from political motivations, droughts were another major driver of migration. By May 2001, the Committee of Afghan Refugees claimed that there were around 4,000 refugees in Dushanbe alone, while the Tajik government put the figure at three to four times that number. These early refugees were primarily ethnic Uzbeks and Tajiks from northern Afghanistan.

With the start of the US-led war in Afghanistan in 2001, the refugee outflow intensified. However, Tajikistan closed their southern border, leaving many refugees trapped on islands in the Panj River which forms the border between the two countries. Tajikistan was the last country bordering Afghanistan to officially close their borders to people without visas, following similar moves by Iran and Pakistan which had both already admitted in excess of one million refugees. The Tajik government cited their own chaotic internal situation caused by the 1992-1997 civil war and lack of funds to provide for refugees as justifications. Afghanistan's neighbors Uzbekistan and Turkmenistan also closed their borders to Afghans. By early 2002, between 4,000 and 10,000 Afghans remained in Tajikistan. The whole group was repatriated to Afghanistan proper later that year.

As of 2006, estimates of the number Tajikistanis that remained in Afghanistan ranged from 1,000 to 20,000. From January 2008 to December 2009, the UNHCR estimates that an additional 3,600 Afghan refugees arrived in Tajikistan, fleeing violence and lawlessness resulting from the Taliban advance into northern Afghanistan's Kunduz Province. Among the refugees are an increasing number of educated English-speakers who fear persecution for their ties to Western non-governmental organizations in Afghanistan. There has also been a shift in the geographical and ethnic origins of refugees, with an increasing number of people from central and southern Afghan cities such as Helmand, Kandahar, and Kabul. However, ethnic Tajiks still make up a large proportion—an estimated 70%— of the latest wave of refugees. The UNCHR expected in 2009 that another seven to eight thousand Afghans may seek refuge in Tajikistan.

Afghan refugees in Tajikistan generally hope to be resettled in economically developed countries, or to return home, rather than remain in Tajikistan. By 2005, the UNHCR had resettled 720 such refugees in the United States and Canada, with plans to resettle a total of 1,500.

== Residency rights ==
In July 2000, the mayor of Dushanbe issued an order that all refugees be moved out of the capital to rural areas, reflecting concerns by Tajik authorities that the refugees were engaged in drug smuggling and illegal business in the capital. The police began carrying out the order in May 2001 despite protests from the UNHCR that this violated the refugees' rights to free movement; however, implementation was slowed by the fact that few rural areas were prepared to resettle the refugees either. Eventually, the implementation of the order was halted. However, as of 2004, refugees who arrived after 2000 were still officially prohibited from residing in 15 cities, including Dushanbe and Khujand. Again in mid-2007, it was reported that Afghan refugees in Dushanbe were being detained by Tajik policemen and returned to the districts in which they were registered. Refugees protested that no work was available in rural districts and they had to go to Dushanbe to earn money to survive. Tajik authorities explained the detentions and expulsions as part of a wider ongoing operation which also applied to Tajik citizens, not just refugees. Refugees generally work as traders in open-air markets.

In 2008, Tajikistan's government granted citizenship to roughly 1,000 Afghans who had resided in the country for two decades, as part of a deal with the United Nations.

== Education ==
Tajikistan's only school aimed specifically at Afghan refugees is located in Dushanbe. Many refugees face difficulties due to their inability to read Russian or Tajik, both of which are written using Cyrillic, in contrast to the various languages of Afghanistan that they speak, which are typically written using the Perso-Arabic script. However, Tajik and Dari, both being forms of Persian, are mutually intelligible in their spoken form, and the UNHCR conducts classes to teach the Russian language to refugee children.

== Politics ==
Afghans in Tajikistan were initially allocated two seats in Afghanistan's 2002 loya jirga. Out of the 13 candidates who first stood for election, the two chosen as representatives were Zohiri Hotam and Simo Nohon. The Declaration of the Essential Rights of Afghan Women was drafted by Afghan exiles in Dushanbe and unveiled there in 2003. However, Afghans living in Tajikistan were not able to vote in the 2009 Afghan presidential election, because the government lacked funds to set up a polling station there. In addition to possessing a UNHCR registration certificate, Afghan nationals residing in Tajikistan may also obtain a Tajikistan-issued document.

== Crime ==
It was reported in 2021 that there were at least 90 Afghans serving prison sentences in Tajikistan, primarily for illegal entry or drug trafficking. A few were also involved in the smuggling of ferula, a plant with medicinal and culinary uses, whose export has been banned since September 2008; it can fetch prices of as high as US$50 per kilogram in Afghanistan. In 2008 an agreement was signed between Afghanistan and Tajikistan on bilateral prisoner exchange.

== Notable people ==
- Nisar Muhammad Yousafzai (Nisor Avalovich Magomedov) - People's Commissariat for Education for the Tajik SSR from 1926 until his assassination in 1937, decorated War Hero of the 1919 Anglo-Afghan War and a founding father of Tajikistan.

== See also ==
- Afghanistan–Tajikistan relations
- Afghan Tajiks
