= Anti-Afghan sentiment =

Prejudice towards the country of Afghanistan or Afghan people

Anti-Afghan sentiment is the dislike, hatred, fear, prejudice, resentment, discrimination against and/or any other form of negative sentiment towards Afghan people and/or negative sentiments towards the country Afghanistan and/or anything associated with it.

The sentiment dates back at least two centuries and has seen a rise in the past few decades across the world with the increase of Afghan migrants, refugees and issues relating to unlawful acts, ranging from minor offenses to more severe ones such as terrorism, sexual violations, drug trafficking, kidnappings and other forms of international crime that have connections to Afghanistan or Afghan people. Such issues have only fueled these bad cultural/national stereotypes.

== By region ==
=== Australia ===
Prejudice towards Afghan people in Australia was first known to be recorded in the 19th century when Afghan migrants first arrived as camel riders in Australia. An anti-Afghan league was even formed in 1886.

=== Asia and Middle East ===
==== Iran ====
Afghan refugees and migrants have lived for decades in Iran. However, the crimes associated with Afghans have led to an increase in anti-Afghan sentiment amongst local Iranian citizens and authorities alike.

==== Pakistan ====
Anti-Afghan sentiment has been reported amongst locals in Pakistan, including public demonstrations with anti-Afghan slogans, resulting from the crime associated with Afghan residents in Pakistan. The past few decades have only seen a rise in this sentiment from Pakistanis.

American scholars, Gortenstien and Vessafi argued in their paper that Afghan enmity towards Pakistan goes back to the country's independence in 1947 which was met by repeated hostility and interference from the Afghan side, including cross border attacks and attempting to fuel internal strife in Pakistan. This included supporting and encouraging anti-state elements within Pakistan's borders. After a period of approximately thirty years of Afghan hostility, the Pakistani intelligence under Zulfikar Ali Bhutto's authorization began supporting violent Islamist uprisings in Afghanistan in retaliation to three decades of Afghan interference in Pakistan. The Islamist Jihadists groups appeared prior to Pakistan's support and were devoted to destroying communist rule in Afghanistan. These jihadist uprisings, later backed by Pakistan and even later by America and its allies, resulted in a full-scale civil war erupting in Afghanistan. This all stems from Afghanistan's refusal to accept the Durrand Line.

In 2011 in the Pakistani province of Khyber Pakhtunkhwa (KP), a local Pashtun father led a demonstration against Afghan residents, alleging they had attacked his sons with steel rods, and later even stalked them to hospital where they went to be treated for injuries. Reacting to one of such incidents, local KP resident, Muhammed Akber, stated "We are Pashtun, but we are Pakistani, not Afghan. The Afghans should go back!"

By late 2023, the Pakistani government began a massive campaign to deport Afghans living in the country; especially the ones with no legal status. The Pakistani government claimed they pose a security threat to the country, alleging them to be the cause of several major terror attacks and narcotics trafficking as well as are a burden on the country's diminishing resources.

In 2024, a mob of Afghans attacked the Pakistani consulate in Frankfurt, Germany. They entered the consulate's premise and hurled stones at the building and took down the Pakistani flag, attempting to burn it. The incident drew strong condemnation from the Pakistani government, including blaming German authorities to prevent these acts from happening and reminding the German government that the Vienna conventions of 1963 required the host country to ensure the security of a foreign diplomatic mission. Meanwhile, also in reaction to the Frankfurt consulate attack, Pakistani defense minister Khaja Asif questioned why Afghans should be allowed to live in Pakistan.

He pointed to various incidents of Afghans abusing Pakistan and challenging its sovereignty. He stated "there's a limit to our hospitality" and that Afghans are "thankless people."

Pakistani columnist Dr Shazia Answer Cheema has advocated the mass deportations of Afghans from Pakistan starting in 2023. She also cited the trend of Afghans traveling abroad on Pakistani documents (usually forged) and committing crimes which she argued poses a threat to overseas Pakistanis as it would further damage their reputation in the host countries. She argues this has been ignored for decades by Pakistani institutions because of the "Ummah" or "Islamic brotherhood" mentality that is commonly ingrained into Pakistani society, which has allowed Pakistan and its people to be exploited in such a manner.

==== Tajikistan ====
The presence of Afghan refugees in Tajikistan incited prejudice amongst local Tajiks, also making it hard for Afghan traders to do business there.

==== Turkey ====
Turkey is currently claimed to be hosting the largest refugee population in the world. With the increase of Afghan refugees and crimes associated with them, public sentiment in Turkey quickly began to turn against Afghans. The result was a further stepping effort by Turkey's government to further secure its border with Iran to stop a further influx of Afghans.

However, with the increase in crime and social disruption, anti-Afghan sentiment continued to rise in Turkey. Social media in Turkey has seen an increase in hate speech against Afghans, even before more refugees arrived.

A video surfaced online showing Turkish ultra-nationalists beating an Afghan man and was circulated on social media.

==== South Korea ====
The immigration of over 300 Afghan evacuees because of the end of the Afghan evacuation in 2021, resulted in a petition and protests from local Koreans to prevent the Afghans from coming. Parents of local school children expressed concerns of the presence of Afghan refugees in a building near their children's schools, citing child safety issues. Parents also cited issues of cultural shocks between Afghan refugee children and their own local children. A senior Korean humanitarian worker warned against the generalizations of immigrants and crime and argued parents should learn about other cultures rather than hold onto xenophobic views.

=== European countries ===
The issue of crime involving Afghan refugees and immigrants has stoked anti-Afghan public sentiment amongst locals across Europe. The worsening situation resulted in European politicians openly stating that Afghans will no longer be welcomed in their individual countries. Another Afghan refugee was quoted stating the sentiment against Afghans was so bad that they were better off going back to Afghanistan rather than "facing humiliation" in Europe.

==== Austria ====
The Austrian press reported the influx of Afghan refugees. At the time of arrival of Afghan refugees and migrants, the local authorities and citizens welcomed them. But soon after overstaying their welcome by increasing the crime problems in the country, public sentiment towards Afghans began to deteriorate badly and stir up anti-Afghan prejudice. An American social worker in Austria alleged that Afghans exceed other migrants/refugees by crime in Europe. Some Afghan refugees accused of sex crimes against minors had previous deportation orders issued against them because of these unlawful acts.

==== Finland ====
A number of sexual crimes committed by Afghan migrants/refugees in Finland has been reported, stirring racist reactions amongst many locals. One of these cases involved the rape of a local fourteen-year-old girl in the town of Kempele by an Afghan national. The reported incident sparked public outcry against refugees and even sparked riots, with human shields of local Finnish citizens blocking the borders to prevent refugees from entering. Some Finnish parliament members even called on refugees not to come to the country.

Two days later another Afghan migrant, Ramin Azimi, knocked unconscious a Finnish girl he was in a previous relationship with and raped her before he burned her to death with gasoline. The incident triggered angry vigilant nationalist mobs, including the Finnish Ku Klux Klan whom took to the streets and engaged in threatening behavior towards refugees. The culprit, Azimi was given a prison sentence with no chance of parole.

A 2018 research report argued that ever since the incidents in Kempele, a surge in affiliating rape crimes with refugees has become a new trend based on stereotypical prejudices.

==== Germany ====
A 23 year old Afghan migrant in Germany was arrested for raping an eleven-year-old girl. About twelve days after being released from prison, he raped a thirteen year old. He was re-arrested shortly. His previous release and actions triggered public outcry. German politicians called for any migrant or refugee convicted of such offenses to be deported back to their country. The acting vice chancellor urged German people not to scapegoat migrants and warned right-wing groups not to exploit the incidents for propaganda purposes.

==== Greece ====
The rise of crime affiliated with Afghan people in Greece has amplified anti-Afghan sentiments in the country. Several incidents involving hate attacks on Afghan residents in Greece have been reported. In one example an Afghan refugee family were beaten in Greece and set adrift into the sea.

==== Italy ====
Italy has grown more and more resistant towards Afghan refugees; especially following public sentiment against the Roma people which was amplified by the European refugee crisis. The recent increase of Afghan refugees has strengthened right-wing sentiments in the country against accepting them. There has been a common sentiment in the country with affiliating refugees with crime.

==== United Kingdom ====
The United Kingdom (UK) has witnessed increasing incidents relating to Afghan refugees causing backlash from locals. In one of these incidents a local teenage girl was forcefully held and raped by Afghan nationals. The incident went viral amongst local British residents on social media and resulted in violent public protests in which a police vehicle was damaged. On 31 January 2024, Afghan asylum seeker Abdul Shakoor Ezedi targeted a mother and her two children in an acid attack in Clapham, a district in South London, being previously convicted of sexual assault and exposure in 2018 and claiming to have converted to Christianity. This incident has contributed higher to anti-Afghan sentiment in the UK.

=== North America ===
==== United States of America ====
Following the 9/11 incidents in 2001, a wave of violent anti-Muslim attacks and other sentiments were directed at Muslim residents. Amongst the slogans were hate speech directed towards Afghans.

Separately, anti-Afghan opinions also arose in the US government for the country's involvement in the global drug trade.

More recently, following the 2020–2021 US troop withdrawal from Afghanistan, American politician Scott Perry, argued against allowing in Afghan refugees without proper investigation; claiming it could lead to a crime hike, including rape crimes against underage minors. He was amongst 16 other American politicians voting against allowing Afghan refugees in without having proper background checks done. His comments drew some criticism. President Donald Trump made similar concerns, claiming terrorists could be airlifted out of Afghanistan.

In late November 2025, after an Afghan was alleged to have attacked two National Guard members, president Trump called for more restrictions imposed on Afghan refugees in the states, going as far as to strip some Afghans of American citizenship. Afghan residents in the country issued a plea to president Trump to reduce the restrictions.

== Cultural criticism ==
Bacha Bazi, a practice found in rural Afghanistan, has been gaining critical attention over the decades by foreigners.

== Ethnic sentiments ==
Ethnic categories in Afghanistan as of 1997

Sentiments against specific Afghan ethnic groups, including towards one another along ethnic lines is also widely documented.

== Anti-Afghan slurs ==
=== Noonkhoshk ===
Iranian people use the word "Afghani" or "Noonkhoshk" is in a derogatory manner for Afghan People. Noonkhoshk means dry bread. And Afghani is a term used to mock an Afghan person.

=== Namak Haram ===
The term "namak haram" (horrid traitor) has become popular amongst Pakistanis over the decades due to Afghans abusing them on the Internet and in foreign countries. This comes in light according to Pakistanis because of hosting millions of Afghan refugees and problems associated with them.

== Anti-Afghan slogans ==
=== Go Afghani go! ===
The English phrase "Go Afghani go!" has been coined and popularized by Pakistani people and flooded on social media, calling for the mass expulsion of Afghan people from Pakistan. This phrase goes back over ten years following the 2014 Peshawar school attack, which involved some Afghan terrorists.

In the Pakistani city of Khairpur the "Go Afghani go" slogan was widespread, calling for the removal of Afghans from the city. Protesters threatened to keep up their campaign until the Pakistani government agreed to heed to their demands and deport Afghan residents.

A song of the same title was developed but in the Sindhi language.

=== Afghanistan murdabad ===
"Afghanistan murdabad" meaning "may Afghanistan perish" has also become a popular slogan for Pakistanis in reaction to the ongoing Afghan enmity.
