= Afghan nationality law =

Citizenship Law of the Afghanistan

Parliament of Afghanistan
- Enacted by: Government of Afghanistan
- Status: Current legislation

Afghan nationality law is regulated by the Constitution of Afghanistan, as amended; the Citizenship Law of the Afghanistan and its revisions; the Afghan Civil Code; and various international agreements to which the country is a signatory. These laws determine who is, or is eligible to be, an Afghan national. Since the Taliban took control of the country in 2021, it is unclear what laws are in place. An announced revision to the constitution was planned for 2022. Due to concerns over human rights violations, the Taliban regime has received no international recognition.

Afghan nationality is typically obtained under the principal of jus sanguinis, i.e., by birth to parents with Afghan nationality. It can be granted to persons with an affiliation to the country, or to a permanent resident who has lived in the country for a given period of time through naturalization. The legal means to acquire nationality, formal legal membership in a nation, differ from the domestic relationship of rights and obligations between a national and the nation, known as citizenship. Nationality describes the relationship of an individual to the state under international law, whereas citizenship is the domestic relationship of an individual within the nation. Some countries use the terms nationality and citizenship as synonyms, despite their legal distinction and the fact that they are regulated by different governmental administrative bodies.

== Acquiring Afghan nationality ==
Nationality in Afghanistan is typically acquired by birth to an Afghan or later in life through naturalization.

=== By birth ===
According to Abdullah Athayi, an attorney and the program coordinator of Foreign/Security Policies and Democratization for the Heinrich Böll Foundation, the Afghan law on nationality is based upon Sharia jurisprudence. Per Athayi, because of stipulations in the Afghan Civil Code, children who are not legitimate or whose parents were not married under Islamic law cannot obtain either citizenship or nationality. International interpretation varies and other nations have noted that there is a conflict between provisions of the Civil Code and the nationality laws. (Note: A 2020 query by the Finnish government sought clarification from other nations to determine if children born to Afghan women married to foreigners or Afghan mothers of illegitimate children whose fathers were unknown or stateless were able to derive nationality from their mother. Varied responses were received, such as the Afghan government would have to clarify if a child had nationality (Czech Republic, Latvia) legitimate or illegitimate children acquire nationality if the father is an Afghan national (Finland, birth to an Afghan mother alone does not ensure nationality but birth to an Afghan father transmits Afghan status (United States), and there is a conflict of laws as illegitimate children cannot gain nationality under the Civil Code (Luxembourg). The German response indicated that as the Civil Code deals with issues of guardianship and obligations of parentage, the nationality law places no restriction of Sharia marriage, and because non-Muslims could acquire Afghan nationality, that any child born to an Afghan parent would acquire the parental nationality; however, no Afghan nationality could be acquired if the father was unknown or if the father was stateless or had unknown nationality.) Those who can acquire nationality by birth include:

- Children born anywhere to at least one parent who is an Afghan national;
- Children born in Afghanistan to foreign parents without diplomatic immunity and who permanently live in Afghanistan acquire Afghan nationality upon reaching the age of majority unless they opt for foreign nationality within six months of becoming eighteen;
- Foundlings whose parents are unknown; or
- Children whose parents are proven to be stateless or who have unknown nationality.

=== By naturalization ===
Foreigners and stateless persons may apply for Afghan nationality by naturalization. General provisions are that applicants are of legal majority, have no criminal history in Afghanistan, and have resided within the country for a minimum of five years. Persons who appear to have the potential to harm national security can be rejected. There are no provisions in the nationality law for adoptees to acquire nationality through their adoptive parents.

== Loss of nationality ==
Afghans are allowed to renounce their nationality, provided that they comply with the application process and confirm that they have no outstanding civic, financial, or penal obligations to the government of Afghanistan or private corporations or persons. Their identity card must be surrendered at the time of application. Renunciation of nationality does not effect the nationality of a spouse or children under Afghan law. Though Article 4 of the 2004 Constitution declares that no Afghan can be deprived of their nationality, denaturalization can occur under the nationality law for persons who commit treasonous acts or other actions that pose a threat to the national security of Afghanistan. Persons who have previously lost nationality may apply for repatriation, which may be granted at the discretion of the Commission charged with review for the Ministry of Justice and the President of Afghanistan.

== Dual nationality ==
Since 2001, Afghans have been allowed to hold dual nationality, though this is in conflict with the terms of the nationality law. The president is barred under the constitution of 2004 from having dual nationality and the legislature has the authority to determine if legislators or cabinet ministers can serve if they hold other nationality.

== History ==
Nationalism is an ideology that is founded on a belief of a political authority for society, which has as its two main goals, union of the polity and freedom from foreign authority. In that context, the area now known as Afghanistan has existed as a nation since the birth in approximately 1500 BC of the Indo-Persian Achaemenid Empire which included Ariana, the first name applied to Afghanistan. From at least the tenth century BC, governance of tribal people in the form of jirgas, public assemblies, were held to encourage participation in self-rule, though the area was constantly in conflict with foreign powers who asserted efforts to take over the state. Tribal society was organized in an egalitarian system, typically without hereditary rule. To gain support for actions, leaders had to build consensus and alliances, as hierarchy, ranks, and titles were objectionable. The hierarchical structures of the Indo-Persian, Turko-Persian, and Turko-Mongolian conquerors ruled the major population and trade centers and left the less strategic areas to fend for themselves. Conquest in this period was characterized by gaining possession of a territory and transforming the conqueror into the legitimate authority. Legitimating rule typically meant that a religious proclamation was followed by issuance of currency and the obligation of the ruler to protect the subjects from other invaders in exchange for their obedience and payment of taxes. The inhabitants under rule were seen as economic assets for the ruler, thus the lands that they occupied and the political activism of the subjects were not necessarily critical. The army under a ruler's command was important to his authority, as lack of military support meant the loss of a ruler's power.

From the sixth century BC, Ariana was a satrapy, or province, of the Achaemenid Empire. In the fourth century BC it was annexed by Alexander the Great, and within a hundred years became a province of the Maurya Empire, under the governance of Ashoka. The spread of Buddhism continued with the founding of the Kushan Empire, which arose in 50 AD in the area of Bagram. Arabs invaded the territory, which became known as part of Khorasan, in the seventh century AD and had firmly implanted Islam by the tenth century. The Ghaznavid Empire, the first Islamic state in the territory, was centered in Ghazni and established in 977. It began to decline with the rise of the Ghurid Empire around 1150 and was conquered by them in 1186. The Ghurids ruled until 1217, when they were defeated by the Khwarazmian Empire, which in turn was brought down by the military superiority of the Mongols under the leadership of Genghis Khan around 1219. When Khan died in 1227, his empire was split among his descendants with what is now Afghanistan being incorporated into the Chagatai (or Jagatai) Khanate. Though the Mongols left troops in the region, they soon lost interest in it and the Il Khanate assigned the rule to a vassal state of Tajik people known as the Karts, who became dominant in Herat in the mid-thirteenth century. By the end of the thirteenth century, the Jagatai and Il Khanates were in conflict and the territory experienced growth under powerful warlords who carved out local domains from the former empire. In 1361, Timur began consolidating his power and eventually founded the Timurid Empire, taking the leadership of the Jagatai Khanate and its territory. During the Timurid Renaissance which lasted through 1506, conflict receded and cultural development and the arts flourished.

At the beginning of the sixteenth century, three empires emerged in Afghanistan. The western territory was ruled by the Safavid dynasty of the Khanate of Bukhara from 1501 to 1786. The eastern territory, with its capital in Kabul was under the control of the Mughal Empire between 1526 and 1858, while the southern region was governed by the Shaybanid Empire between 1500 and 1598. The sixteenth through seventeenth centuries were marked by a period of building resistance to foreign rule. By the eighteenth century, the Ghilji Pashtuns who founded the Hotaki dynasty rebelled against the Safavid dynasty defeating them in Kandahar in 1709. The Abdali Pashtun tribes took Herat in 1716, and a combined force of Hotaki, Abdali, and Balochi forces attacked the Safavid capital at Isfahan in Persia in 1722 ending the rule of the Safavids. In response Persian troops from Khorasan recaptured the area in the 1730s. When the Persian leader, Nader Shah was killed in 1747, Afghanistan was effectively separated from Persia, establishing one of the commanders of the Afghan forces and a former bodyguard of Nader, Ahmad Kahn as the new shah of the Abdali tribes, who thereafter called themselves the Durrani.

=== Establishing Afghanistan (1747–1920) ===
Ahmad Shah subsequently led nine invasions through the Indian subcontinent, establishing boundaries of his state stretching from the Amu Darya River in the north, southward to the Indian Ocean and from the Indus River in the east, westward to Khorasan. The majority of his armies were Pashtun people, and from the time of Ahmad Shah's rise, Pashtun identity was politically dominant, though he ruled a multi-ethnic population. At the end of the eighteenth century, Britain began extending its control in India stopping Afghan expansion. Britain, France, and Russia, each accelerated their plans of imperial conquest and in an effort to curb the expansion of their rivals, from 1809 Afghanistan became a buffer zone between the colonial powers. Internally, after a struggle between the Barakzai and Mohammadzai clans, the Durrani Empire collapsed in 1823 and the Emirate of Afghanistan was founded by Dost Mohammad Khan. Fearing an alliance between Russia and Afghanistan, the British involved themselves in affairs of the Afghan throne, which brought about the First Anglo-Afghan War. Exiling the legitimate ruler to India, the British installed a new shah who would lead under their direction. British advice to the shah led to a series of political errors that impacted both the social structure and economy, and in the unrest that followed, the British withdrew from the country in 1842.

In 1843, Dost Mohammad Khan returned and was reinstated to his rule with the promise that the British would refrain from further interference, if he refrained from expanding to India. Between 1845 and 1863, the Emirate was able to incorporate Herat, Kandahar, and Turkistan, unifying the territory, but the areas were indirectly ruled and administration was neither centralized or modernized. A five-year period of civil unrest followed Dost Mohammad Khan's death in 1863. During the same time frame, Britain and Russia made several agreements over their expansion spheres in Central Asia. Each of the rivals tried to gain favor in various parts of the territory, and tensions escalated into the Second Anglo-Afghan War in 1878. Two years later, the war ended and Abdul Rahman Khan was recognized by Britain as the new Afghan head of state. The terms that were agreed upon at the end of the conflict were that the Emirate would allow Britain to negotiate its matters of foreign affairs without involving itself in Afghanistan's internal affairs. In exchange, Britain would provide protection and assistance, in the form of money and weapons to prevent aggression or challenge to the rule of Abdul Rahman Khan.

Almost immediately, changes were made to the governmental organization. Princes were no longer allowed to head provincial governments, local autonomy was ended in favor of centralized rule, and the military was reformed as a regular army, rather than being organized as feudal levies. Abdul Rahman Khan reconquered territory that had previously broken away and enforced a policy of expelling or killing nobles who refused to comply with his new type of administration. He declared that his rule stemmed from the divine right of kings rather than consensus of the jirga; brought the Waqf, religious endowments, under state authority and subjected mullahs and priests to examinations to verify their credential and control their power; and unified the Sharia court system. His reign ended in 1901 and was followed by the reign of his son who continued the relationship with Britain. He was succeeded in 1919 by Amanullah Khan who began the Third Anglo-Afghan War with the intent of gaining Afghan independence from Britain. The war lasted for less than a month and resulted in a treaty granting the Afghans control of their foreign affairs, recognition of the Emirate's independence, and acknowledgement of the Durand Line as the border between Afghanistan and British India.

=== Nizamnama phase (1920–1929) ===
Upon gaining independence, the Emirate embarked upon a period of modernization and introduced a constitutional government. The first constitution of Afghanistan was enacted in 1922 and went into force in 1923. It defined in Article 8, subjects of the kingdom as residents in the territory without regard to their religious affiliation and called for the drafting of a nationality law. The subsequent nationality law that was passed did not create further definitions to acquire or lose Afghan nationality, but instead provided the administrative procedure to obtain a national identity card, known as tazkira, based upon descent from an Afghan male. Though it also stated that foreigners could acquire Afghan nationality, no provisions were given as to how that was to be done. In 1926, a royal decree changed the government from an emirate to a monarchy, but continued efforts at reform and secularization pushed the country into civil war. When the conflict ended in 1929, modernization continued. Afghanistan became a party to the Convention on Certain Questions Relating to the Conflict of Nationality Laws in 1930 and established a legislature in 1931. The new constitution adopted in 1931 confirmed the monarchy and succession requirements and established Islam as the official religion of the country.

=== Osolnama phase (1932–1964) ===
In 1932 a statute concerning women's nationality was issued, which prohibited Muslim women from marrying outside the faith. The law automatically bestowed Afghan nationality to women upon marriage to an Afghan, but deprived women who married foreigners of their status as Afghans. Women who were married to non-Muslims could only acquire Afghan nationality if their husbands naturalized. Upon becoming a widow, a Muslim woman could revert to her original nationality, but a non-Muslim woman could not renounce Afghan nationality. A new nationality law was promulgated in 1936 and introduced the concept of obtaining nationality under jus soli, birth in the territory. To acquire nationality by jus soli, the law required a child who was born in the country to have one parent who was also born in Afghanistan and who had continuously resided in the territory, or the child to be born and to reside in the country until their majority, as long as the parent did not have diplomatic immunity. Within one year of reaching the age of majority, a child meeting the criteria could apply to acquire the nationality of their father. Children born anywhere to Afghan mothers or fathers, under Article 2 of the law, automatically were Afghan. The law reaffirmed that married women followed the status of their husbands, but was modified to allow divorcées, as well as widows, who could prove the termination of their marriage to reacquire their original nationality. Foreigners could naturalize after five years of residency or service to the government, as long as they had no record of committing crimes. Afghans were allowed to voluntarily renounce their nationality, but the government was not allowed to denaturalize persons unless they were in service to a foreign government or military, they committed treason or acts against the interests of Afghanistan, they failed to perform their social or public responsibilities, or they established a permanent residence abroad and maintained no relationship with Afghanistan.

=== Qanoonnama phase (1964–2021) ===
The 1931 Constitution remained in place until 1964. The 1964 Constitution called for a constitutional monarchy and establishment of a bicameral legislature, introduced a series of rights and freedoms, and confirmed Islam as the state religion. Article 1, affirmed that nationality would be defined by legislation. In 1973, the government was overthrown by a coup d'état and a new constitution was drafted that abolished the monarchy and the legislature, but was never ratified. The 1976 Constitution created an authoritarian republic, but it was abrogated in 1980, after a second coup d'état. Immediately after the coup, the Soviet Union sent military advisors to assist the new government and within six months, had signed over thirty agreements to provide assistance worth over US $14 billion. The establishment of the Democratic Republic of Afghanistan, resulted in promulgation of an interim socialist constitution. In 1986, a new nationality law was passed which introduced minor changes. Among them was the prohibition of dual nationality and a condition for naturalization requiring an applicant to ally themselves with the social and political ideology of the republic. Under the new provisions women were afforded for the first time individual nationality, meaning that marriage no longer had an effect on gaining or losing Afghan nationality.

In 1987, a constitutional convention passed a new constitution that revised economic and political administration in the country, but failed to implement administrative institutions that would resolve conflicts. In the midst of the turmoil caused by the Soviet withdrawal, and the civil conflict which began in 1989, the constitution was amended in 1990, but failed to gain public support. On 15 March 1992, a new nationality law replaced the former legislation but did not make significant changes to previous provisions. Following the collapse of the Soviet Union, the Afghan government was overthrown in April 1992. That month, Peshawar Accord was drafted in an attempt to draw an end to the hostilities and provide stability through the creation of an interim government for the Islamic State of Afghanistan. The agreement was ineffective and factionalism reignited a civil war which would leave the government without a legislature for the next fourteen years. Though an attempt was made to establish a government in 1995, factionalism prevented its forming and the war continued. The Taliban took control of Kandahar in 1994, Herat in 1995, Kabul in 1996, and Bamiyan in 1998. By 1999 after securing ninety seven percent of the country, the Taliban pressed for formal governance of the country under Islamic law. Though it failed to gain international recognition, the Taliban established an administrative structure and issued policy decrees based upon religious law. On 11 June 2000 they abolished the 1992 Nationality Law and replaced it without making substantive changes to the processes for acquiring or losing Afghan nationality.

In 2001 after the Taliban fell, the path to an inclusive and representative government was established under the Bonn Agreement. The three phases included establishing an interim government, calling a constitutional commission and legislature to draft a new constitution within eighteen months, and then holding executive and legislative elections based upon the constitutional provisions within six months. Because of a need to engage educated Afghans in the process of reestablishing a government, the interim government agreed to allow Afghans who had acquired other nationality abroad to retain that nationality and reacquire their nationality in Afghanistan, meaning that dual nationality was permitted from 2001. After public consultation, a draft constitution was presented in 2003, ratified by the loya jirga, and approved by proclamation in 2004. Presidential and legislative elections were held in accordance with the constitutional provisions and a parliament was installed in 2005. To bring the nationality law into conformity with the new constitution's recognition of dual nationality, in 2015 an amendment to the law was proposed and preliminary work began to update the nationality statute. It had not been completed by 2017.

=== Current policy (2021–present) ===
When the Taliban retook control of the country in 2021, it was unclear whether the existing laws of Afghanistan would remain in place. In response to the takeover, various governments in Europe and the United States evacuated Afghan nationals. An announcement was made in September by Mawlavi Abdul Hakim Sharaee (or Abdul Hakim Sharaey), the acting Minister of Justice that the country would be governed under provisions of the 1964 Constitution which conformed with Sharia law. Provisions in the constitution, laws, or international conventions that did not follow Islamic jurisprudence, per Sharaee would be discarded. The Taliban also announced that month, plans to hold a constitutional convention to draft a new constitution in 2022. As of 2022, no international recognition had been forthcoming for Taliban rule. The international position is based primarily upon the failure of the regime to agree to govern according to the "needs and rights of the diverse Afghan population" rather than "a narrow ideology and even narrower ethnic base", according to Deborah Lyons, head of the United Nations Assistance Mission in Afghanistan. Of particular concern to the international community are the fundamental rights and freedoms of women and girls, and religious and ethnic minorities under Taliban policies.

== See also ==
- Afghan identity card
- Afghan passport
- Visa requirements for Afghan citizens
- Afghan diaspora
- Durand Line
