= Afghan passport =

Passport issued to Afghan citizens

- Front cover of an Afghan passport. New passports continue to carry this design despite the overthrow of the Islamic Republic of Afghanistan in 2021.
- Type: Passport
- Issued by: General Directorate of Passports
- First issued: 1880
- Purpose: Identification; international travel
- Eligibility: Afghan citizenship
- Expiration: 5-10 years
- Cost: 5,000-10,000 afghanis (AFN)

Afghan passports are international travel documents issued by the Ministry of Interior or sometimes by the Ministry of Foreign Affairs to nationals and citizens of Afghanistan. Every person with a valid electronic Afghan identity card (e-Tazkira) can apply for and receive an Afghan passport, which is renewable every 5–10 years.

The Afghan passport was introduced by Emir Abdur Rahman Khan in 1880. The country began issuing biometric passports in September 2011 to diplomats and public servants, and in March 2013 for the general public. Abdul Karim Hasib is the current director of the General Directorate of Passports. His predecessor was Alam Gul Haqqani.

As of 2018, the cost of an Afghan passport is 5,000 afghanis (AFN) for a five-year validity and 10,000 afghanis for a ten-year validity. In April 2023, it was reported that up to 10,000 passports could be issued daily. This number was expected to reach up to 15,000.

The Afghan passport is considered the least powerful passport in the world, with its holders only able to visit 23 destinations visa-free.

== History ==
The Afghan passport was introduced by Emir Abdur Rahman Khan in 1880.

In September 2011, Afghanistan's Ministry of Foreign Affairs began issuing two types of biometric passports (e-passports) for Afghan diplomats and public servants. These were produced in the United Kingdom. The standard e-passports began being issued to the general public in March 2013. According to then-spokesman of the Ministry of Foreign Affairs, Janan Musazai, "on the photo page, there are 16 security codes." Issuance of national electronic Afghan identity cards (e-Tazkiras) were also discussed. These changes were intended to prevent fraud in future elections and government corruption as well as to improve the overall security of Afghanistan.

In 2017, a new five-year Afghan passport was reported to cost 5,000 AFN. Previously, passports had been hand written based on information found on paper Afghan ID cards, which are no longer accepted. A ten-year passport later became available for 10,000 AFN. By January 2016, nearly one million of the new computerized Afghan passports have been issued.

Passport distribution centers exist in many provinces of Afghanistan, with the main ones located in Kabul Province. A total of four different locations within Kabul are believed to be distributing passports. The General Directorate of Passports stated that it issued 500,000 passports in one year and collected over 4.2 billion AFN in processing fees. In addition to being a travel document, the passport can also be used to purchase a SIM card; send or receive money through MoneyGram or Western Union; open bank accounts; rent a house; or stay in hotels.

The Afghan embassies and consulates also provide Afghan passports to the Afghan diaspora around the world. After a pause following the Taliban takeover of the government in August 2021, distribution of passports resumed before the end of that year. Though it was reported in March 2022 that the Taliban had introduced a new design bearing the name "Islamic Emirate of Afghanistan", Shirshah Quarishi, deputy director of the Passport Department, said in August 2022 that passports would not carry a new design, which was likely a practical decision taken to ensure they would be accepted for travel by other countries, all of which continue to recognize the previous regime.

== Visa requirements ==
Visa requirements for Afghan citizens for holders of regular Afghan passports Afghanistan Visa free access Visa on arrival eVisa Both visa on arrival and eVisa available Visa required

As of April 2025, Afghan citizens have visa-free or visa on arrival access to 25 countries and territories, ranking the worst passport in the world according to the Henley Passport Index. Because the ruling Islamic Emirate of Afghanistan is not internationally recognized, it is continuing to issue passports bearing the name of the former, internationally-recognized government, the Islamic Republic of Afghanistan, which are accepted for international travel. However, obtaining foreign visas from within Afghanistan is difficult as many embassies in Afghanistan have closed in the wake of the Fall of Kabul on 15 August 2021.

== Corruption ==
In 2015, Afghanistan's TOLOnews reported that a number of citizens of Iran and Pakistan have fraudulently obtained Afghan passports. It was reported recently "that a number of counterfeiters abroad had prepared passport booklets, smuggled them into the country and distributed them to the public." It was also reported that some people pay hundreds of US dollars for fake emergency medical documents, which allow them to obtain Afghan passports expeditiously. According to KabulNow, in 2023 middlemen quoted fees of US$2000-US$3000 for a passport, with much of the money going to Taliban officials.

== See also ==
- Afghan Post (passport delivery service)
- Afghan nationality law
- Visa requirements for Afghan citizens
