= Visa requirements for Israeli citizens =

Administrative entry restrictions

An Israeli passport

Visa requirements for Israeli citizens refers to regulations pertaining to visas for holders of Israeli passports. As of 2026, Israeli citizens have visa-free or visa on arrival access to 166 countries and territories, ranking the Israeli passport 16th in the world according to the Henley Passport Index.

== History ==
According to Israeli law, Lebanon, Syria, Iraq, Yemen and Iran are designated as enemy countries and an Israeli citizen must obtain a special permit from the Israeli Ministry of the Interior to visit these countries. An Israeli who visits these countries, whether with a foreign or an Israeli passport, may be prosecuted when coming back to Israel; however, prosecution is rare.

This list was set in 1954, and was updated on 25 July 2007 to include Iran, and again in 2019 to remove Saudi Arabia. Egypt and Jordan remained on the "enemy countries" list; however, the Israeli Ministry of the Interior had issued a general unlimited permit to visit these countries, following the peace treaty signed by Israel with each country, hence voiding the law in respect to each country. Under an Israeli military order, Israeli citizens except for security personnel carrying out operations are prohibited from entering the Gaza Strip, which is ruled by Hamas, and Area A of the West Bank, where the Palestinian Authority exercises full civil and security control.

In addition to these countries, there are other countries that prohibit entry to Israeli passport holders, after joining the Arab boycott of the State of Israel, including Maldives, Malaysia, Brunei, Pakistan, and Bangladesh.

Some controversial rejections of Israeli nationals include tennis player Shahar Pe'er who was denied a visa to the United Arab Emirates which would have allowed her to play in the 2009 Dubai Open. However, later she was allowed. Furthermore, Israeli judo athletes and ministers have been allowed into the UAE more recently. This was prior to signing the 2020 Abraham Accords.

== Recent developments ==
As of 21 February 2021, Israel has signed six peace treaties with Arab countries.

Following the Egypt–Israel peace treaty in 1979, and the Israel–Jordan peace treaty in 1994, more countries have signed peace treaties with Israel.

On 15 September 2020, Israel and the UAE established diplomatic relations in Washington DC, and signed a peace agreement, which removed all restrictions on Israeli citizens' travel to the UAE.

On 15 September 2020, Israel and Bahrain established diplomatic relations in Washington DC, and signed the Bahrain–Israel normalization agreement, which removed all restrictions on Israeli citizens' travel to Bahrain.

On 23 October 2020 an agreement took place between Sudan and Israel with the mediation of the United States involving the recognition of the state of Israel by Sudan and the establishment of full diplomatic relations.

On 10 December 2020, Donald Trump announced that Israel and Morocco agreed to establish full diplomatic relations, while also announcing that the United States recognized Morocco's claim over Western Sahara.

On 12 December 2020, Israel and Bhutan formally established full diplomatic relations.

On 1 February 2021, Israel and Kosovo established full diplomatic relations over Zoom, and established a Kosovan embassy in Jerusalem.

In June 2022, Saudi Arabia and Israel held talks as a precursor to establishing formal diplomatic relations. Saudi officials say it is a question of when, not if.

On 19 October 2023, Israel became the 41st country that joined the United States Visa Waiver Program.

On 2 June 2024, Maldives proposed banning entry for Israeli citizens in response to the Gaza war. The ban came into immediate effect on 15 April 2025.

On 26 December 2025, Israel recognized Somaliland as an independent state, and Israeli passport holders can now enter with a visa on arrival (cash only).

== Visa requirements map ==
Visa requirements for Israeli citizens holding ordinary passports Israel Visa not required / ETA Visa on arrival eVisa Visa available both on arrival or online Visa required Admission refused or travel banned by the Israeli government due to safety concerns.

== Visa requirements ==
Visa requirements for holders of ordinary passports traveling for tourist purposes. Visa requirements for holders of Teudat Maavar (travel document in lieu of passport) may vary.

Country	Visa requirement	Allowed stay	Notes (excluding departure fees)	Reciprocity
Afghanistan	Admission refused			-
Albania	Visa not required	90 days	90 days within 180-day period.	✓
Algeria	Admission refused		Part of the Arab League boycott of Israel.	-
Andorra	Visa not required	90 days	There are no visa requirements in Andorra, Entry into the country is possible through France or Spain.; 90 days within any 180-day period in the Schengen Area.	✓
Angola	Visa not required	30 days	30 days per trip, but no more than 90 days within any 1 calendar year for tourism purposes only.; Visitors must have a return/onward ticket and a hotel reservation confirmation.; An International Certificate of Vaccination is required.	X
Antigua and Barbuda	eVisa	180 days	Visa not required for 24 hours if arriving by cruise.	X
Argentina	Visa not required	90 days		✓
Armenia	eVisa / Visa on arrival	120 days	Obtainable on arrival at Zvartnots International Airport or prior to travel online.	X
Australia	Online Visa required		Apply online (Online Visitor e600 visa).; Dual nationals of Australia must enter and depart using their Australian passport.; Some territories and islands require special permits.	X
Austria	Visa not required	90 days	90 days within any 180-day period in the Schengen Area.	✓
Azerbaijan	eVisa / Visa on arrival	30 days	e-Visa also available.; Admission refused to foreign nationals with passport stamps from Nagorno-Karabakh, Armenian citizens and other Armenians.	X
Bahamas	Visa not required	90 days		✓
Bahrain	eVisa / Visa on arrival	14 days	Visitors must hold proof of sufficient funds and provide an address in Bahrain.; Visitors not holding return/onward tickets could be refused entry.; Visa Application.	X
Bangladesh	Admission refused			-
Barbados	Visa not required	180 days		✓
Belarus	Visa not required	90 days	90 days within any 180-day period.	✓
Belgium	Visa not required	90 days	90 days within any 180-day period in the Schengen Area.	✓
Belize	Visa not required	90 days		✓
Benin	eVisa	30 days	Must have an international vaccination certificate.; Three types of electronic visa are offered: the e-Visa valid for 30 days for a single entry (50 EUR), the e-Visa valid for 30 days for several (multiple) entries (75 EUR), and the e-Visa valid for 90 days to make several (multiple) entries (100 EUR).	X
Bhutan	eVisa	90 days	The Sustainable Development Fee (SDF) of 200 USD per person, per night for almost all visitors to Bhutan. Additionally, if payment is made in US dollars from September 1, 2023 to August 31, 2027, the SDF is 100 USD.	X
Bolivia	Visa not required	90 days		X
Bosnia and Herzegovina	Visa not required	90 days	90 days within 180-day period.	X
Botswana	Visa not required	90 days	90 days within any 1-year period.	✓
Brazil	Visa not required	90 days	90 days within 180-day period.	✓
Brunei	Admission refused		Brunei does not recognise Israel as a state, and hence prohibits entry of Israeli citizens into its territory.	-
Bulgaria	Visa not required	90 days	90 days within any 180-day period in the Schengen Area.	✓
Burkina Faso	eVisa			X
Burundi	Online Visa / Visa on arrival	1 month	From December 2021, passengers of all countries that required visa, can now obtain visa on arrival at Bujumbura International Airport, and all land borders.	X
Cambodia	eVisa / Visa on arrival	30 days	Visa on arrival is available at the airport.	X
Cameroon	eVisa			X
Canada	Electronic Travel Authority	180 days	eTA required if arriving by air.	✓
Cape Verde	Visa on arrival (EASE)	30 days	Visa on arrival may applied for via the online platform (EASE) and issued at international airports in Sal, Boa Vista, São Vicente or Santiago. Visa fee is approximately 25–30 EUR.; Visitors must pay the Airport Security Fee (TSA) before visiting. The cost is 3,400 CVE (approx. 31EUR) and can be paid via the online platform (EASE).	X
Central African Republic	Visa not required	90 days		X
Chad	eVisa		Must have a round trip ticket. A passport valid for 6 months and with at least two blank pages for stamps on arrival and departure must be presented. Must provide proof of hotel stay, as well as an international vaccination certificate.	✓
Chile	Visa not required	90 days		✓
China	Visa required		May apply for a multiple entry visa for up to 10 years validity.	✓
Colombia	Visa not required			✓
Comoros	Visa on arrival	45 days		X
Republic of the Congo	Online Visa required		Visitors must obtain a visa from the Republic of the Congo embassy. However, they can also apply for the visa online at the website of at the Republic of the Congo embassy in France.	✓
Democratic Republic of the Congo	eVisa	7 days	In addition to a visa, visitors must hold an invitation letter or a hotel reservation. Exempt are foreign nationals of Congo origin.	X
Costa Rica	Visa not required	90 days		✓
Côte d'Ivoire	eVisa	3 months	e-Visa holders must arrive via Port Bouet Airport.	X
Croatia	Visa not required	90 days	90 days within any 180-day period in the Schengen Area.	✓
Cuba	eVisa	90 days		✓
Cyprus	Visa not required	90 days	90 days within any 180-day period.	✓
Czech Republic	Visa not required	180 days		✓
Denmark	Visa not required	90 days	90 days within any 180-day period in the Schengen Area.	✓
Djibouti	eVisa	90 days		X
Dominica	Visa not required	180 days		✓
Dominican Republic	Visa not required	30 days	Extendable to 120 days.	✓
Ecuador	Visa not required	90 days		✓
Egypt	Visa required		Visa not required for visits to Sinai resorts for up to 14 days if entering only through Taba Border Crossing or Sharm El Sheikh International Airport.	✓
El Salvador	Visa not required	90 days	Central America-4 Border Control Agreement.	✓
Equatorial Guinea	eVisa			X
Eritrea	Visa required			✓
Estonia	Visa not required	90 days	90 days within any 180-day period in the Schengen Area.	✓
Eswatini	Visa not required	30 days		✓
Ethiopia	eVisa / Visa on arrival	90 days	Visa on arrival is obtainable only at Addis Ababa Bole International Airport.; e-Visa holders must arrive via Addis Ababa Bole International Airport.; e-Visa is available for 30 or 90 days.	X
Fiji	Visa not required	120 days		✓
Finland	Visa not required	90 days	90 days within any 180-day period in the Schengen Area.	✓
France	Visa not required	90 days	90 days within any 180-day period in the Schengen Area.	✓
Gabon	eVisa	90 days	e-Visa holders must arrive via Libreville International Airport.	X
Gambia	Visa required			✓
Georgia	Visa not required	365 days		✓
Germany	Visa not required	90 days	90 days within any 180-day period in the Schengen Area.	✓
Ghana	Visa required			✓
Greece	Visa not required	90 days	90 days within any 180-day period in the Schengen Area.	✓
Grenada	Visa not required	90 days		✓
Guatemala	Visa not required	90 days	Central America-4 Border Control Agreement.	✓
Guinea	eVisa	90 days		X
Guinea-Bissau	Visa on arrival	90 days		X
Guyana	eVisa			X
Haiti	Visa not required	90 days		✓
Honduras	Visa not required	90 days	Central America-4 Border Control Agreement.	✓
Hungary	Visa not required	90 days	90 days within any 180-day period in the Schengen Area.	✓
Iceland	Visa not required	90 days	90 days within any 180-day period in the Schengen Area.	✓
India	eVisa	30 days	e-Visa holders must arrive via 32 designated airports (Note: Ahmedabad; Amritsar; Bagdogra; Bengaluru; Bhubaneswar; Chandigarh; Chennai; Coimbatore; Delhi; Gaya; Goa-Dabolim; Goa-Manohar; Guwahati; Hyderabad; Indore; Jaipur; Kannur; Kochi; Kolkata; Kozhikode; Lucknow; Madurai; Mangaluru; Mumbai; Nagpur; Port Blair; Pune; Surat; Thiruvananthapuram; Tiruchirappalli; Varanasi; Visakhapatnam) or 5 designated seaports. (Note: Chennai; Cochin; Mormugao (Goa); Mumbai; Mangalore); An Indian e-Tourist Visa may only be obtained twice within 1 calendar year.; Foreigners of Pakistani origin or who hold a Pakistani Passport are not eligible for an e-Visa. Foreigners who are not Pakistani nationals, but whose parents or grandparents (either paternal or maternal) were born in, or were permanent residents in Pakistan, are also not eligible for an e-Visa.	✓
Indonesia	Visa required		Israeli citizens are subject to the calling visa category, a designation applied to nationals considered to have specific vulnerabilities or risks related to ideology, politics, economy, society, culture, security, or immigration.; Prior approval from the Directorate General of Immigration in Jakarta is required before applying for a visa.; In addition to holding a visa, travelers must obtain a reference letter from the Directorate General of Immigration and present the invitation letter submitted with their visa application before traveling to Indonesia.; Entry allowed only via Denpasar-Bali (DPS), Jakarta - Halim Perdana Kusuma (HLP), Jakarta - Soekarno-Hatta (CGK), and Surabaya (SUB).	✓
Iran	Admission refused / Travel illegal under Israeli law		Defined as an enemy state under Israeli law.	-
Iraq	Admission refused / Travel illegal under Israeli law		Part of the Arab League boycott of Israel.; Defined as an enemy state under Israeli law.	-
Ireland	Visa not required	90 days		✓
Italy	Visa not required	90 days	90 days within any 180-day period in the Schengen Area.	✓
Jamaica	Visa not required	90 days		✓
Japan	Visa not required	90 days		✓
Jordan	eVisa / Visa on arrival		Conditions apply.; Visitors traveling on an Israeli passport are required to provide proof of a pre-arranged booking of a Jordanian guide, in addition to a printed reservation for a hotel stay. Failure to present such proof is likely to result in refusal of entry. These pre-conditions are generally waived for Arab citizens of Israel.; Border crossing prohibited via King Hussein/Allenby Bridge crossing for Israeli citizens.; Up to 2 days visa free entry from Yitzhak Rabin Crossing / Wadi Araba Crossing.; 30 days visa issued upon arrival at Jordan River Crossing and Queen Alia International Airport.; Visitors going through the Jordan River Crossing staying less than 3 days will have to pay a 40 JD visa fee, otherwise the fee is 10 JD.	X
Kazakhstan	Visa not required	30 days		X
Kenya	Electronic Travel Authorisation	90 days	Applications can be submitted up to 90 days prior to travel and must be submitted at least 3 days in advance.; eTA fee is 32.50 USD.; Proof of reservation at the hotel where visitors plan to stay is required (if staying with friends, an invitation letter is also acceptable).; Yellow fever vaccination certificate is required if coming from endemic countries.	X
Kiribati	Visa not required	90 days	Visa exempt visits may not exceed 90 days within any calendar year period.	X
North Korea	Visa required		Visitors traveling for tourist purposes must hold an authorization to travel, issued by a travel company in North Korea.; Travel to North Korea requires approval of the foreign ministry of Israel.	✓
South Korea	Electronic Travel Authorization	90 days	The validity period of a K-ETA is 3 years from the date of approval.	✓
Kuwait	Admission refused		Part of the Arab League boycott of Israel.	-
Kyrgyzstan	Visa not required	30 days	30 days within any 60-day period.	X
Laos	eVisa / Visa on arrival	30 days	18 (Note: Savannakhet Airport; Lanetoui - Mengkang (China); Meuangmom - Wan Pong (Myanmar); Banvang - Ban Khok Phai (Thailand); Namngeun - Huay Kon (Thailand); Paksan - Bueng Kan (Thailand); Paktaphan - Pak Saeng (Thailand); Pangmon - Ban Huak (Thailand); Phoudou (Thailand); Dak ta ock - Nam Giang (Vietnam); La Lai (Vietnam); Namkan (Vietnam); Namphao - Cau Treo (Vietnam); Namsoy - Na Meo (Vietnam); Naphao - Cha Lo (Vietnam); Pahang - Long Sap (Vietnam); Panghok - Tây Trang (Vietnam); Phoukeua - Bo Y (Vietnam)) of the 33 border crossings are only open to regular visa holders.; e-Visa may be used to enter Laos through the Luang Prabang, Pakse and Vientiane international airports, 3 Thai-Lao Friendship Bridges (Note: Vientiane (Friendship Bridge 1); Savannakhet (Friendship Bridge 2); Bokeo (Friendship Bridge 4)), in Boten (road and railroad), and in Vientiane (at Khamsavath railway station).; Visa on arrival is available at the Luang Prabang, Pakse and Vientiane international airports, 4 Thai-Lao Friendship Bridges (Note: Vientiane (Friendship Bridge 1); Savannakhet (Friendship Bridge 2); Khammouane (Friendship Bridge 3); Bokeo (Friendship Bridge 4)) and 7 border crossings. (Note: Nongnokkheane - Trapeang Kriel (Cambodia); Boten - Bo han (China); Golden Triangle/Samliemkham (Thailand); Khamsavath railway station (Thailand); Namheuang - Ban Na Kraseng (Thailand); Vang tao - Chongmek (Thailand); Dansavan - Lao Bảo (Vietnam))	X
Latvia	Visa not required	90 days	90 days within any 180-day period in the Schengen Area.	✓
Lebanon	Admission refused / Travel illegal under Israeli law		Part of the Arab League boycott of Israel.; Defined as an enemy state under Israeli law.	-
Lesotho	Visa not required	90 days		✓
Liberia	e-VOA	3 months		X
Libya	Admission refused		Part of the Arab League boycott of Israel.	-
Liechtenstein	Visa not required	90 days	90 days within any 180-day period in the Schengen Area.	✓
Lithuania	Visa not required	90 days	90 days within any 180-day period in the Schengen Area.	✓
Luxembourg	Visa not required	90 days	90 days within any 180-day period in the Schengen Area.	✓
Madagascar	eVisa / Visa on arrival	90 days	For stays of 61 to 90 days, the visa fee is 59 USD.	X
Malawi	Visa not required	90 days		✓
Malaysia	Admission restricted		Israeli citizens are generally refused entry and transit.; For other purposes, a visa is required. In addition to a visa, a clearance permit from the government should also be obtained from the Ministry of Home Affairs prior to arrival in Malaysia.	-
Maldives	Admission refused		Admission for Israeli passport holders has been refused since 15 April 2025 by the Maldivian government, in response to the Gaza war.	-
Mali	Visa required			✓
Malta	Visa not required	90 days	90 days within any 180-day period in the Schengen Area.	✓
Marshall Islands	Visa not required	90 days		✓
Mauritania	eVisa	30 days	Available at Nouakchott–Oumtounsy International Airport.	X
Mauritius	Visa not required	90 days		✓
Mexico	Visa not required	180 days		✓
Micronesia	Visa not required	30 days		✓
Moldova	Visa not required	90 days	90 days within any 180-day period.	✓
Monaco	Visa not required	90 days	90 days within any 180-day period in the Schengen Area.	✓
Mongolia	Visa not required	30 days		✓
Montenegro	Visa not required	90 days	90 days within any 180-day period.	✓
Morocco	eVisa	30 days	The e-Visa has a duration of 30 days and can be extended up to 6 months with multiple-entry in Morocco.; Nationals of Israel born in Morocco can obtain a visa on arrival. They must have a Moroccan national ID card.; Nationals of Israel residing in Israel with a letter issued by the Council of Jewish Communities of Morocco can obtain a visa on arrival.; In July 2023, the Moroccan embassy in Israel stopped providing entry visas for Israelis who want to enter Morocco.	X
Mozambique	Electronic Travel Authorization	30 days	Visitors must register their ETA on the e-Visa platform at least 48 hours before travel and pay a processing fee of 48 USD.	X
Myanmar	eVisa / Visa on arrival	28 days	e-Visa holders must arrive via Yangon, Nay Pyi Taw or Mandalay airports or via land border crossings with Thailand — Tachileik, Myawaddy and Kawthaung or India — Rih Khaw Dar and Tamu.; e-Visa available for both tourism (allowed stay is 28 days) or business (allowed stay is 70 days) purposes.	X
Namibia	eVisa / Visa on arrival	3 months / 90 days	Visa on arrival is available at the following locations: Hosea Kutako International Airport; Impalila Island; Katima Mulilo; Ngoma; Trans Kalahari (Buitepos); Walvis Bay Airport	X
Nauru	Free visa on arrival			✓
Nepal	eVisa / Visa on arrival	90 days	Nationals of Israel traveling on business can obtain a visa on arrival for a maximum stay of 5 years. They must have a license issued by the Ministry of Industry.	X
Netherlands	Visa not required	90 days	90 days within any 180-day period in the Schengen Area.	✓
New Zealand	Electronic Travel Authority	3 months	International Visitor Conservation and Tourism Levy must be paid upon requesting an Electronic Travel Authority.; Holders of an Australian Permanent Resident Visa or Resident Return Visa may be granted a New Zealand Resident Visa on arrival permitting indefinite stay (pursuant to the Trans-Tasman Travel Arrangement), subject to meeting character requirements and obtaining an Electronic Travel Authority prior to departure. Such travellers are not required to pay the International Visitor Conservation and Tourism Levy.	✓
Nicaragua	Visa not required	90 days	Central America-4 Border Control Agreement.	X
Niger	Visa required			✓
Nigeria	eVisa	30 days	Passengers with a visa approval obtained before departure at www.immigration.gov.ng can obtain a visa on arrival.	X
North Macedonia	Visa not required	90 days		✓
Norway	Visa not required	90 days	90 days within any 180-day period in the Schengen Area.	✓
Oman	Admission refused		Except Transit	-
Pakistan	Admission restricted		Unless a visa and police registration are obtained.	-
Palau	Visa not required	90 days		✓
Panama	Visa not required	90 days		✓
Papua New Guinea	eVisa / Visa on arrival	60 days		✓
Paraguay	Visa not required	90 days		✓
Peru	Visa not required	90 days		✓
Philippines	Visa not required	60 days		✓
Poland	Visa not required	90 days	90 days within any 180-day period in the Schengen Area.	✓
Portugal	Visa not required	90 days	90 days within any 180-day period in the Schengen Area.	✓
Qatar	Visa required			✓
Romania	Visa not required	90 days	90 days within any 180-day period in the Schengen Area.	✓
Russia	Visa not required	90 days	90 days within any 180-day period.	✓
Rwanda	eVisa / Visa on arrival	30 days		X
Saint Kitts and Nevis	Electronic Travel Authorisation	90 days		✓
Saint Lucia	Visa not required	6 weeks		✓
Saint Vincent and the Grenadines	Visa not required	30 days		✓
Samoa	Entry permit on arrival	90 days		✓
San Marino	Visa not required	90 days	90 days within any 180-day period in the Schengen Area.	✓
São Tomé and Príncipe	eVisa			X
Saudi Arabia	Admission restricted		Part of the Arab League boycott of Israel.; Israeli Muslims may get a temporary Jordanian passport to enter the country for Hajj / Umrah purposes only.; Israeli businesspeople can obtain a special visa in order to enter the country.	-
Senegal	Visa on arrival	1 month	Nationals of Israel can obtain a visa on arrival for a maximum stay of 1 month. They must have a passport valid for a minimum of 6 months from the arrival date, and a return/onward ticket.; Passengers can obtain a visa on arrival for a maximum stay of 3 months if they have confirmation that a visa has been approved before departure.	X
Serbia	Visa not required	90 days	90 days within any 180-day period.	✓
Seychelles	Electronic Border System	90 days	Application can be submitted up to 30 days before travel.; Visitors must upload a reservation confirmation(s) for each visitor's location of stay in Seychelles.; Yellow fever vaccination certificate is required if coming from endemic countries.; Payment of the fee (EUR 10) by credit or debit card.; Valid for one journey only and it expires once exit the country.	X
Sierra Leone	eVisa / Visa on arrival	90 days / 30 days		X
Singapore	Visa not required	30 days		✓
Slovakia	Visa not required	90 days	90 days within any 180-day period in the Schengen Area.	✓
Slovenia	Visa not required	90 days	90 days within any 180-day period in the Schengen Area.	✓
Solomon Islands	Visa not required	90 days		✓
Somalia	eVisa	30 days		X
South Africa	Visa not required	90 days		✓
South Sudan	eVisa		Obtainable online 30 days single entry for 100 USD, 90 days multiple entry for 200 USD and 180 days multiple entry for 350 USD.; Printed visa authorization must be presented at the time of travel.	X
Spain	Visa not required	90 days	90 days within any 180-day period in the Schengen Area.	✓
Sri Lanka	ETA / Visa on arrival	30 days		X
Sudan	Visa required		Sudan and Israel agreed on normalizing their relations on October 23, 2020. Israel–Sudan normalization agreement.; More information regarding visas between the countries will be available soon.	✓
Suriname	Visa not required	90 days	An entrance fee of USD 50 or EUR 50 must be paid online prior to arrival.; Multiple entry e-Visa is also available.	✓
Sweden	Visa not required	90 days	90 days within any 180-day period in the Schengen Area.	✓
Switzerland	Visa not required	90 days	90 days within any 180-day period in the Schengen Area.	✓
Syria	Admission refused / Travel illegal under Israeli law		Part of the Arab League boycott of Israel.; Defined as an enemy state under Israeli law.	-
Tajikistan	eVisa / Visa on arrival	60 days / 45 days	e-Visa holders can enter through all border points.	X
Tanzania	eVisa / Visa on arrival	90 days		X
Thailand	Visa not required	60 days		X
Timor-Leste	Visa on arrival	30 days	Not available at all entry points.	X
Togo	eVisa	15 days		X
Tonga	Visa not required	90 days		✓
Trinidad and Tobago	Visa not required	90 days		✓
Tunisia	Visa required		For passengers traveling on an organized tour, the representative of the organizing travel agency should submit a list showing full names and nationalities of tour members to the special service of the national police prior to arrival.	✓
Turkey	Visa not required	90 days	90 days within any 180-day period.; Visitors exceeding the allowed time of stay must obtain a permit of residence ("Ikamet Vesikasi") at immigrations and must present it upon departure.	X
Turkmenistan	Visa required		10-day visa on arrival if holding a letter of invitation provided by a company registered in Turkmenistan with a prior approval from the Foreign Ministry. Visitors can apply to extend their stay for an additional 10 days.; When transiting between two non-bordering countries, visitors can obtain a Turkmenistan transit visa for a five-day stay. This must be applied for in advance at the Turkmenistan Embassy. Visitors must also submit copies of the visas for the country of entry into Turkmenistan and the country of departure from Turkmenistan. Visa fee is 20 USD.	✓
Tuvalu	Visa on arrival	1 month		X
Uganda	eVisa	3 months		X
Ukraine	Visa not required	90 days		✓
United Arab Emirates	Visa not required	90 days		✓
United Kingdom	Electronic Travel Authorisation	180 days		✓
United States	Visa Waiver Program	90 days	ESTA is valid for 2 years from the date of issuance.; ESTA is also required when entering the country by cruise ship or land.; A Form I-94 is required for entry into the United States by land. It carries a $30 fee and can be obtained either online or upon arrival.; Visa required for nationals of VWP countries who have travelled or been present in Iran, Iraq, Libya, North Korea, Somalia, Sudan, Syria or Yemen at any time on or after 1 March 2011 or Cuba at any time on or after 12 January 2021, or nationals of VWP countries who are also nationals of Iran, Iraq, North Korea, Sudan or Syria. Exceptions apply if the travel was in military or diplomatic service of the VWP country.	✓
Uruguay	Visa not required	3 months		✓
Uzbekistan	Visa not required	30 days	Visitors with stays longer than three days must register with the local police, within three working days of arrival. For visitors staying in a hotel, registration is done by the hotel. Registration is strictly checked when leaving Uzbekistan.	X
Vanuatu	Visa not required	120 days		✓
Vatican City	Visa not required	90 days	90 days within any 180-day period in the Schengen Area.	X
Venezuela	eVisa		Dual nationals of Venezuela must enter and depart using their Venezuelan passport.; No relations since 2009, Israel advises its citizens to not visit Venezuela.	✓
Vietnam	eVisa		e-Visa is valid for 90 days and multiple entry.; Nationals of Israel arriving directly at Phu Quoc (PQC) for a maximum stay of 30 days.	X
Yemen	Admission refused / Travel illegal under Israeli law		Part of the Arab League boycott of Israel.; Defined as an enemy state under Israeli law.	-
Zambia	Visa not required	30 days	Also eligible for a universal visa allowing access to Zimbabwe.	X
Zimbabwe	eVisa / Visa on arrival	1 month	Also eligible for a universal visa allowing access to Zambia.	X

=== Pre-approved visas pick-up ===
Pre-approved visas can be picked up on arrival in the following countries instead in embassy or consulate.

Countries	Conditions
Bhutan	For a maximum stay of 15 days if the application was submitted at least 2 and a half months before arrival and if the clearance was obtained.
Cameroon	Must hold approval from the General Delegate of Security.
Eritrea	Must have a sponsor who must submit an application at least 48 hours before arrival.
Liberia	Available only if arriving from a country without a diplomatic mission of Liberia and if a sponsor obtained an approval.
Nigeria	Holders of a visa application who have a Nigerian company taking responsibility for them.
Sudan	Holders of an entry permit issued by the Ministry of Interior.
Turkmenistan	Holders of an invitation letter of the local company that was approved by the Ministry of Foreign Affairs.

=== Unrecognised or partially recognised countries ===
Country	Visa required	Allowed stay	Notes	Reciprocity
Abkhazia	Visa required		Tourists from all countries (except Georgia) can visit Abkhazia for a period not exceeding 24 hours as part of an organized tourist group.; Israel does not recognize Abkhazia and South Ossetia, as Israel sees them as integral parts of Georgia.; Israel advises its citizens to avoid any visits to these regions, and visits to those regions are the responsibility of the visitor.; Israel also demands that any visit to those regions include approval from the Georgian authorities prior to the visit.	X
Kosovo	Visa not required	90 days	90 days within any 180-day period.	✓
Northern Cyprus	Visa not required	90 days	Israel does not recognize North Cyprus, as Israel sees it as an integral parts of Cyprus.; Israel advises its citizens to avoid any visits to these regions, and visits to North Cyprus are the responsibility of the visitor.	X
Palestine	Admission refused			X
Sahrawi Arab Democratic Republic	Undefined visa regime		Undefined visa regime in the Western Sahara controlled territory.; Israel does not recognize Sahrawi Arab Democratic Republic and sees it as an integral part of Morocco.	X
Somaliland	Visa on Arrival			✓
South Ossetia	Visa required		To enter South Ossetia, visitors must have a multiple-entry visa for Russia and register their stay with the Migration Service of the Ministry of Internal Affairs within 3 days.; Israel does not recognize Abkhazia and South Ossetia, as Israel sees them as integral parts of Georgia.; Israel advises its citizens to avoid any visits to these regions, and visits to those regions are the responsibility of the visitor.; Israel also demands that any visit to those regions include approval from the Georgian authorities prior to the visit.	✓
Taiwan	Visa not required	90 days	Israel Economic and Cultural Office in Taipei; Working holiday visa	✓
Transnistria	Visa not required		Israel does not recognize Transnistria and sees it as an integral part of Moldova.	X

=== Dependent and autonomous territories ===
Countries	Conditions of access	Notes
Argentina
Argentine Antarctica	Visa not required	
(Misiones Province) Isla Apipé and Isla del Medio	Visa not required	
Australia
Australian Antarctic Territory	Permit required	
Christmas Island	Australian Online Visa required	Online Visitor e600 visa.
Cocos (Keeling) Islands	Australian Online Visa required	Online Visitor e600 visa.
Heard Island and McDonald Islands	Permit required	
Macquarie Island	Permit required	
Norfolk Island	Australian Online Visa required	Online Visitor e600 visa.
China
Hong Kong	Visa not required	90 days
Macau	Visa not required	90 days
Chile
Chilean Antarctic Territory	Permit required	
Denmark
Faroe Islands	Visa not required	90 days
Greenland	Visa not required	90 days
Ecuador
Galápagos	Pre-registration required	60 days; Visitors must pre-register to receive a 20 USD Transit Control Card (TCT).
France
French Guiana	Visa not required	90 days
French Polynesia	Visa not required	90 days
French Southern and Antarctic Lands	Permit required	
(France) French West Indies	Visa not required	90 days; Includes overseas departments of Guadeloupe and Martinique and overseas collectivities of Saint Martin and Saint Barthélemy
Mayotte	Visa not required	90 days
New Caledonia	Visa not required	90 days
Réunion	Visa not required	90 days
Saint Pierre and Miquelon	Visa not required	90 days
Wallis and Futuna	Visa not required	90 days
Netherlands
Aruba	Visa not required	90 days
Caribbean Netherlands	Visa not required	90 days; includes Bonaire, Sint Eustatius and Saba
Curaçao	Visa not required	90 days
Sint Maarten	Visa not required	90 days
New Zealand
Cook Islands	Visa not required	31 days
Niue	Visa not required	30 days
Ross Dependency	Electronic Travel Authority	90 days
Tokelau	Visa required	
Norway
Peter I Island	Permit required	
Svalbard	Visa not required	
Queen Maud Land	Permit required	
Portugal
Madeira	Visa not required	90 days
Azores	Visa not required	90 days
United Kingdom
Akrotiri and Dhekelia	Visa not required	90 days within any 180-day period in the Schengen Area.
Anguilla	Visa not required	90 days
Ascension Island	eVisa	3 months within any 1-year period.
Bermuda	Visa not required	
British Indian Ocean Territory	Permit required	
British Antarctic Territory	Permit required	
British Virgin Islands	Visa required	
Cayman Islands	Visa not required	180 days
Falkland Islands	Visa not required	A visitor permit is normally issued as a stamp in the passport on arrival, The maximum validity period is 1 month.
Gibraltar	Visa not required	90 days within any 180-day period in the Schengen Area.
Guernsey	Visa not required	
Isle of Man	Visa not required	
Jersey	Visa not required	
Montserrat	Visa not required	180 days
Pitcairn Islands	Visa not required	14 days
Saint Helena	Visa not required	
South Georgia and the South Sandwich Islands	Permit required	
Tristan da Cunha	Permit required	
Turks and Caicos Islands	Visa not required	90 days
United States
American Samoa	Electronic authorization	30 days
Guam	Visa not required	
Northern Mariana Islands	Visa not required	
Puerto Rico	Electronic System for Travel Authorization	Visa not required under the Visa Waiver Program, for 90 days on arrival from overseas for 2 years. ESTA required.
U.S. Virgin Islands	Electronic System for Travel Authorization	Visa not required under the Visa Waiver Program, for 90 days on arrival from overseas for 2 years. ESTA required.

== Consular protection of Israeli citizens abroad ==
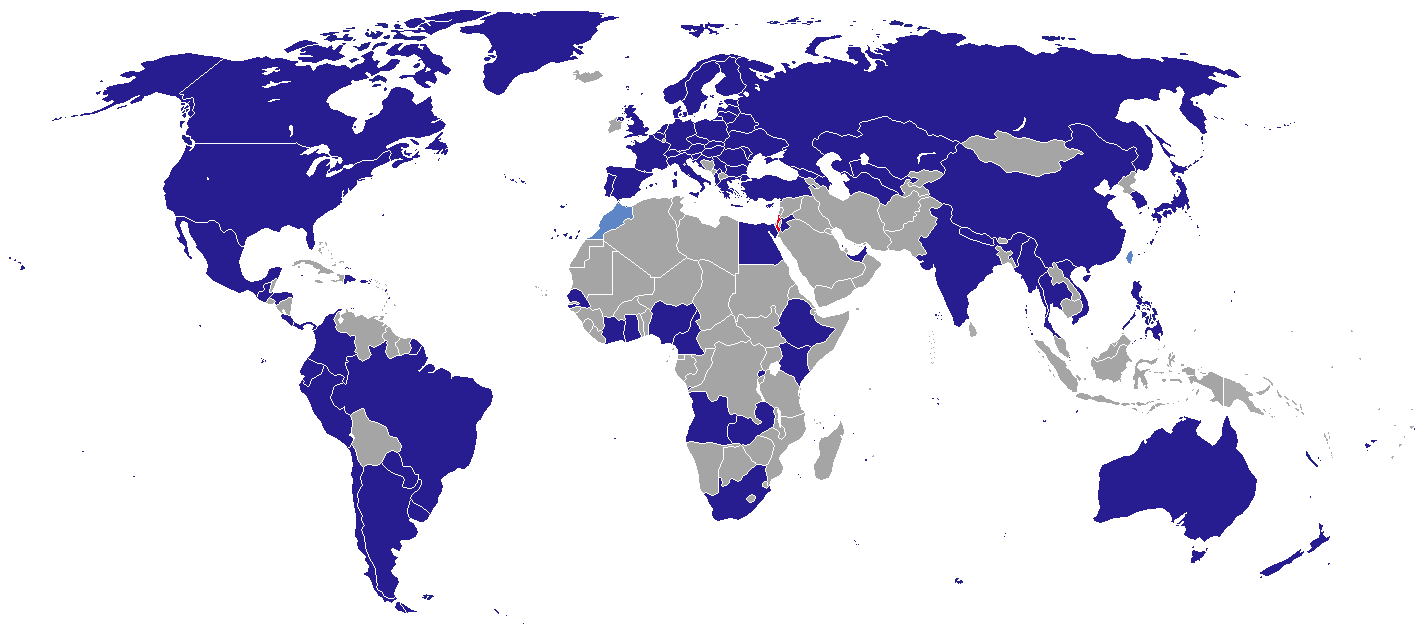
Diplomatic missions of Israel

There are 70 resident embassies, 23 consulates and five "special" missions in the 164 states that recognise Israel. As of 2014, Germany offers consular assistance to Israelis in countries without Israeli representation. Canada offers consular assistance to Israelis in Cuba. North Korea does not recognise Israel, denouncing it as an "imperialist satellite". Since 2016, Israeli civilians have been permitted to travel to North Korea without intermediaries, with appropriate visas available in Israel.

== Arab-Israeli conflict ==
Due to ongoing conflict with Arab nations, 13 Arab members of the United Nations do not recognize the State of Israel: Algeria, Comoros, Djibouti, Iraq, Kuwait, Lebanon, Libya, Qatar, Saudi Arabia, Somalia, Syria, Tunisia, and Yemen. Israeli citizens need special approval from the Ministry of Interior to visit most of these countries.

== See also ==
- Israeli identity card
- List of nationalities forbidden at border
- Visa policy of Israel
- International recognition of Israel
- Israeli travel document in lieu of national passport#Visa requirements
