= Visa policy of Afghanistan =

Policy on permits required to enter Afghanistan

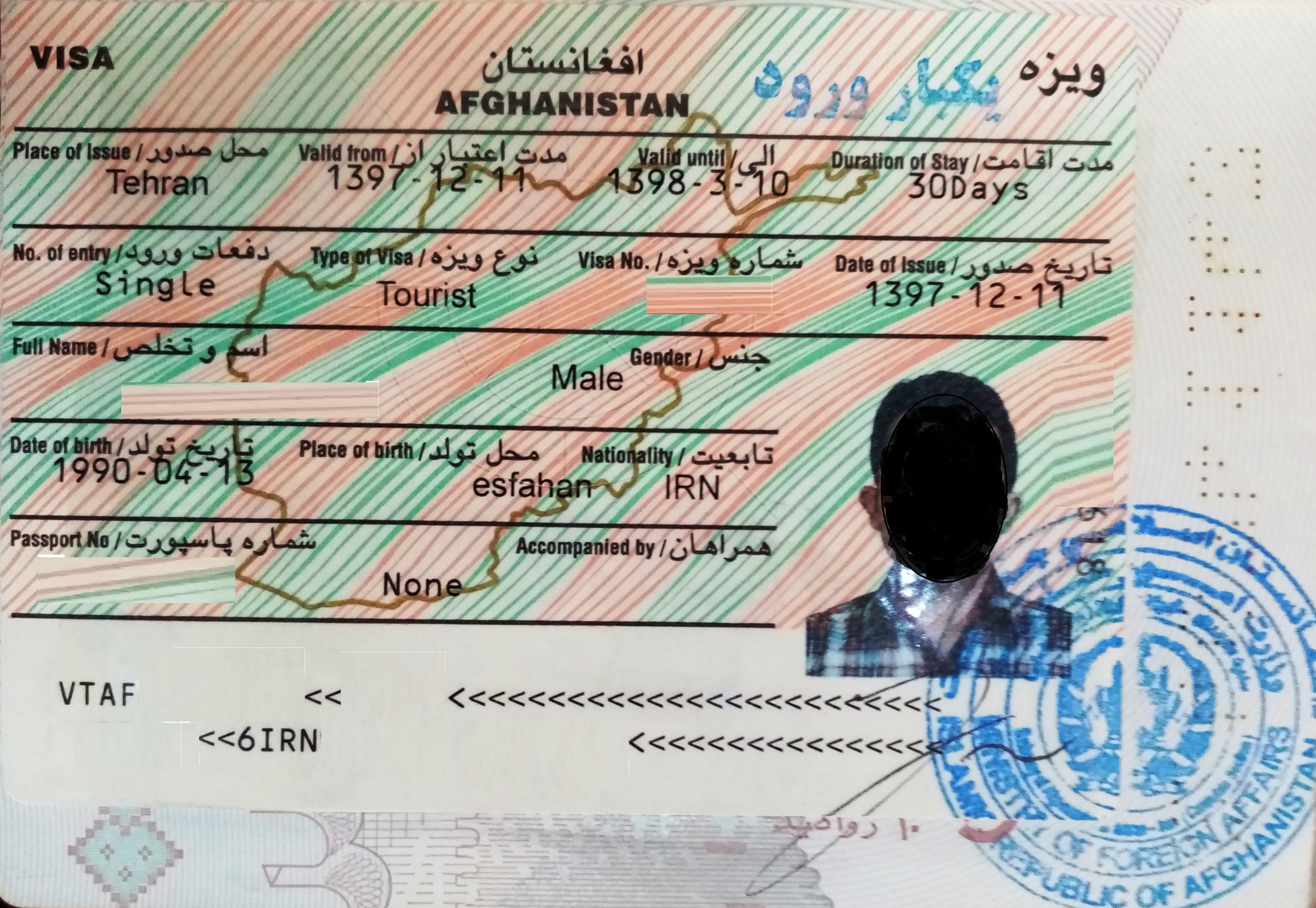
An Afghan visa issued in 2019

Citizens of all countries require a travel visa to visit Afghanistan. The only case allowing visa free access to ordinary passport holders is if the traveler was born in Afghanistan or to Afghan parents, including those born to at least one Afghan citizen parent or whose parent was born in Afghanistan. Since 2026, however, citizens of almost all countries of the world can obtain a visitor e-Visa online, with some exceptions.

In June 2022, government spokesman Zabiullah Mujahid said: "Anyone can visit Afghanistan for the purpose of humanitarian activities and tourism." Between March 2023 and March 2024, nearly 28,000 foreigners visited Afghanistan for work and tourism purposes.

Israeli passports are not accepted for travel to Afghanistan, a policy that predates Taliban rule and reflects Afghanistan's continuous non-recognition of Israeli statehood.

Despite the Taliban's denial of Taiwanese statehood, the Taiwanese passport is valid for travel to Afghanistan, and Taiwanese citizens are eligible for the tourist e-Visa.

== Visa policy map ==
Visa policy of Afghanistan Afghanistan eVisa for citizens, except those residing in ineligible country Visa required for residents and citizens, except those residing in eVisa-eligible country Visa required for residents and citizens Admission refused for citizens; non-citizen residents require visa

== Proposed reform ==
In February 2015, Afghanistan announced visa-on-arrival facility at Kabul International Airport for business visitors, journalists, athletes, airline staff and passengers in transit from countries that do not have a diplomatic mission of Afghanistan.

In September 2017, some elements of the proposed reform were adopted.

On December 10, 2022, the Taliban Ministry of Industry and Commerce opened the "Afghanistan Investment Desk" at Kabul Airport which will facilitate visas on arrival for certain foreign investors.

== Visa on arrival ==
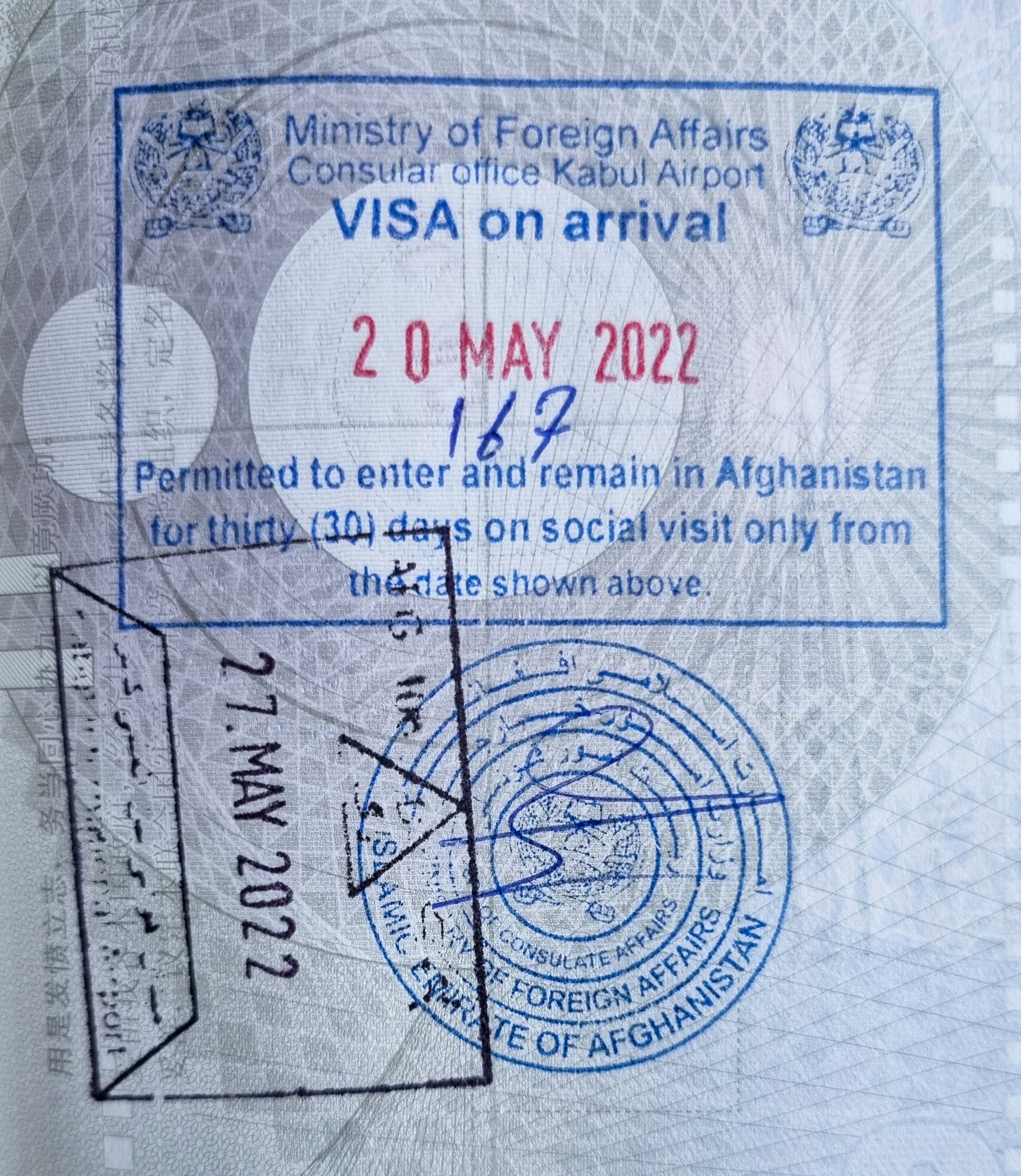
Islamic Emirate visa on arrival stamp issued at Kabul Airport in 2022

United Nations laissez-passer and Interpol Travel Document — As of 2024, foreign citizens with a United Nations passport or an Interpol passport are issued a visa on arrival at only Kabul International Airport to enter, stay and travel across the territory of Afghanistan. Foreign citizens who are employees of the United Nations or its specialised agencies are also issued a visa on arrival during the period of work.

== Electronic Visa (e-Visa) ==
eVisa Afghanistan
- Owners: Consulate General of Afghanistan in Dubai, United Arab Emirates
- Website: visaportal.eafghans.com

Afghanistan launched a new online e-Visa system in March 2026 to simplify visa applications and encourage tourism. Currently, the portal issues only a single-entry tourist e-Visa, valid for stays of up to 30 days from the date of entry and expiring 90 days from the date of issue; the e-Visa may currently be used only when arriving through Kabul International Airport.

Citizens of most UN member countries are eligible for the e-Visa as are citizens of Kosovo, Palestine, Taiwan, (Note: The e-Visa application portal does not allow selecting Taiwan or Republic of China as the country of residence or of nationality.) and Vatican City. Citizens and residents of every neighboring country except the People's Republic of China are ineligible as are residents of certain other countries.

=== Citizens and non-citizen residents ineligible ===
- Iran
- Israel
- Pakistan
- Kazakhstan
- Tajikistan
- Turkmenistan
- Uzbekistan

=== Residents ineligible ===
Residents of the following countries are ineligible regardless of citizenship.

- Azerbaijan
- China
- India
- Indonesia
- Kyrgyzstan
- Malaysia
- Oman
- Qatar
- Russia
- Turkey
- Saudi Arabia
- United Arab Emirates

== Entry prohibited ==
Admission is refused to citizens of Israel. No visas of any category are issued to them, and the Israeli passport is not a recognized travel document. Non-citizen residents of Israel may not obtain an e-Visa.

== Unauthorized diplomatic missions ==
Since July 2024, Afghanistan no longer accepts visas or any other documents issued by diplomatic missions of Afghanistan disloyal to the Taliban.

== Restrictions on mode of entry and exit ==
Travellers with stamped visas on which the "Entry Point" says "Air Only" instead of "Air & Land" may only enter and exit Afghanistan by air.

== Non-ordinary passports ==
Afghanistan has bilateral visa exemption agreements for holders of diplomatic and service passports with different countries including:

30 days

- China^{D}
- Cuba^{D O S}
- India^{D}
- Iran^{D}
- Tajikistan^{D}
- Vietnam^{D O}

_{D - Diplomatic passports}
_{O - Official passports}
_{S - Service passports}

In 2024 Turkey suspended the agreement signed in 2008.

== Visitors ==
Country	2018	2017	2016	2015	2014
Uzbekistan	▲38,276	▲32,130	▲18,900	▼15,888	17,802
Russia	▼1,450	▲1,463	1,357		
Other	No data				

== See also ==
- Tourism in Afghanistan
- Visa requirements for Afghan citizens
