= Alam Gul Haqqani =

Head of the Afghan passport Department

Mawlawi Alam Gul Haqqani
- مولوي علم ګل حقاني

Head of the Afghan Passport Department
- In office September 2021 – March 2022

Personal details
- Party: Taliban
- Profession: Politician

Mawlawi Alam Gul Haqqani (Pashto: مولوي علم ګل حقاني) is an Afghan Taliban politician who served as head of the Afghan passport Department.
