= Zaki Daryabi =

Journalist

- Education: Kabul University
- Occupation: Journalist
- Known for: Founder of Etilaatroz

Zaki Daryabi (Persian/Dari/Hazaragi: ذکی دریابی) is an award-winner renowned Hazara journalist from Afghanistan currently living in exile. He is the co-founder and editor-in-chief of the Etilaatroz and KabulNow newspapers. He has been known for his investigative journalism exposing chronic nepotism and corruption within Afghanistan's government. In 2020, he won Transparency International’s Anti-Corruption Award.

== Early life ==
Zaki Daryabi was born in 1987 in Jaghuri, Ghazni province. He belongs to the Hazara ethnic group, one of the most persecuted groups in the world. In 2010, he obtained a BA from the Department of Law and political science at Kabul University. After graduation, he briefly worked at the Afghan Government Media and Information Center. In 2012, he co-founded the Etilaatroz newspaper, which he financially struggled to publish for the first few years. But, after five years of covering corruption, he turned the newspaper into one of the country's most influential national media outlets. Daryabi exposed high-level corruption scandals in the Afghan government. In 2017, for example, Etilaatroz revealed "a deal between the Afghan government and a campaign sponsor of President Ashraf Ghani during the 2014 presidential race. Ghani had signed a deal to sell off real estate to the private company at a 90 percent discount. Following the newspaper’s report, the contract was halted." According to BBC, he was briefly detained by the office of Afghanistan's attorney general for exposing corruption. After the takeover of Kabul by the Taliban on August 15, 2021, Daryabi lived under constant threats. In early September 2021, the Taliban arrested five journalists of the Etilaatroz. Eventually, on October 03, 2021, Daryabi was forced to leave Afghanistan for the U.S. He and his family later resettled in the Washington D.C. suburb. In the summer of 2022, Daryabi resumed publishing Etilaatroz alongside its English version KabulNow (kabulnow.com), from exile. The newspaper is being run by a team of seven staffers in an office building in Silver Spring, Maryland, just miles outside Washington, DC.

== Documentary film ==
In 2022, Zaki Daryabi and Abbas Rezaie co-produced a documentary film, the Etilaat Roz. The film documents events occurring within the office of the Etilaatroz. In August 2021, "staff are left with an impossible choice after the Taliban seize power: stay and continue reporting—risking torture, imprisonment, and death—or join thousands of others attempting to flee the country. ‘Etilaat Roz’ staff member Abbas Rezaie films his colleagues as they navigate the days that changed their lives and the direction of the country."
