= Israeli passport =

Passport issued to citizens of the State of Israel

Israeli passport דרכון ישראלי
- Front cover of a contemporary Israeli biometric passport, issued since 2013

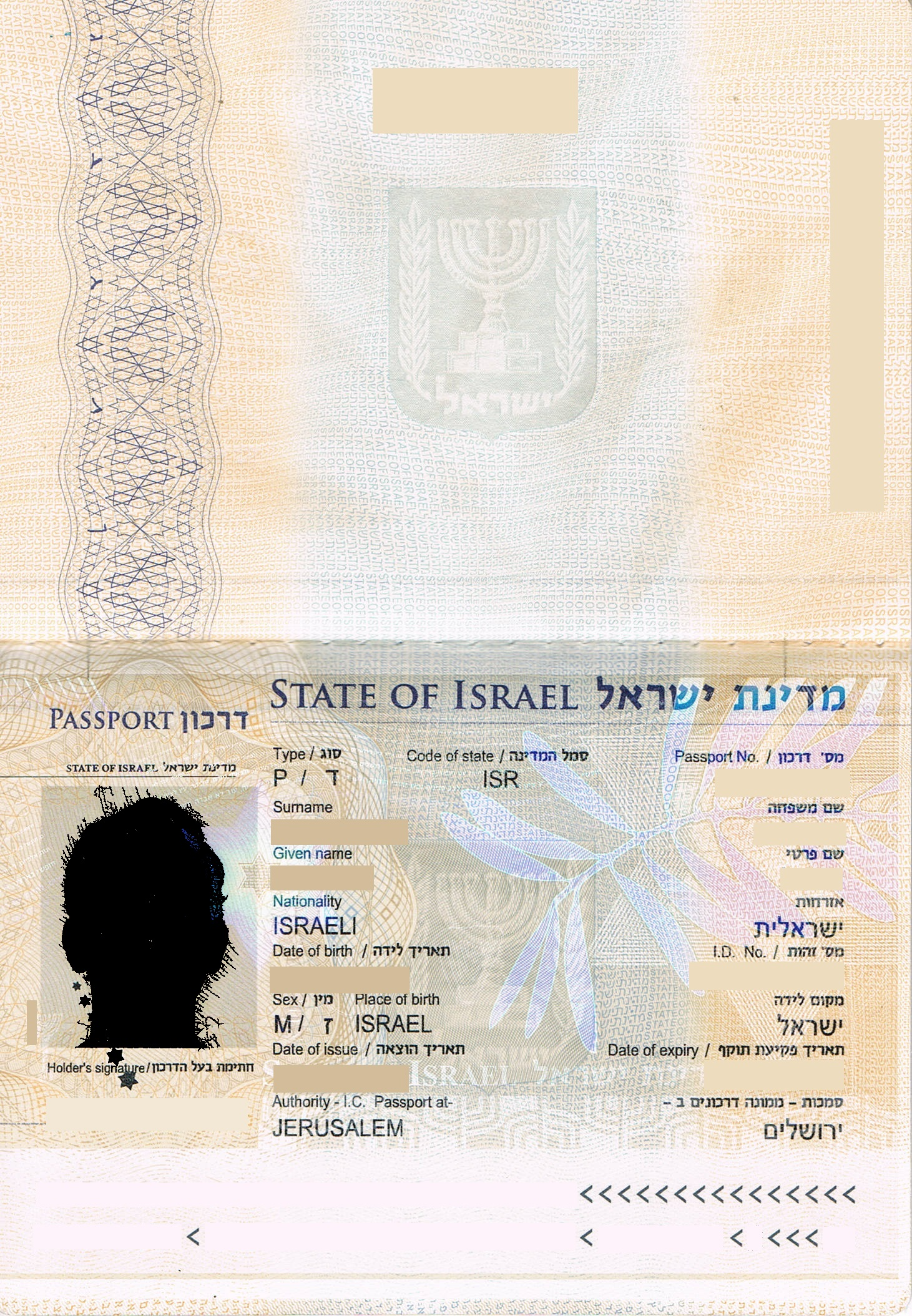
- Data page of a contemporary Israeli biometric passport, 2014
- Type: Passport
- Issued by: Ministry of Interior
- First issued: 1 January 2012 (biometric passport)
- Purpose: Identification
- Eligibility: Israeli citizenship
- Expiration: 1, 5, or 10 years after issuance
- Cost: ₪260 (adult, summer, online payment); ₪165 (adult, winter, online payment); ₪280 (adult, payment at passport office); ₪135 (child, summer, online payment); ₪100 (child, winter, online payment); ₪150 (child, payment at passport office)

The Israeli passport (Hebrew: דַּרְכּוֹן יִשְׂרְאֵלִי Dárkōn Yīśreʾēli; Arabic: جواز سفر إسرائيلي Jawāz Safar Isrāʾīlī) is the travel document issued to citizens of the State of Israel for the purpose of international travel. It grants the bearer visa-free or visa-on-arrival access to 170 countries and territories, where they are entitled to the protection of Israeli consular officials. Israeli passports are issued in Israel by the Population and Immigration Authority which is subordinated to the Ministry of Interior or abroad in one of Israel's diplomatic missions.

Holders of the Israeli passport—or, in some cases, a foreign passport that has been used to enter Israel—are entirely prohibited from entering sixteen countries.

== History ==
=== 1948–1980 ===
Mandatory Palestine passports ceased to be valid at the end of the British Mandate of Palestine on 15 May 1948. Israel began issuing what was described as travel documents from that date, with an initial validity of two years and used Hebrew and French texts. After the Knesset (Israeli parliament) passed the Israeli nationality law in 1952, Israeli travel documents began to be described as passports. The first passport was issued to Golda Meir, who at the time worked for the Jewish Agency and was soon to become Israel's ambassador to the Soviet Union (USSR).

The first Israeli travel documents bore the limitation: "Valid to any country except Germany." An Israeli who wished to visit Germany had to ask that the words "except Germany" be deleted from their passport. This was done manually by drawing a line through these words. After the signing of the Reparations Agreement between Israel and West Germany in 1952, the limitation was withdrawn and passports became "valid to all countries".

=== 1980–present ===
Israeli passports issued after 30 March 1980 have used Hebrew and English texts, instead of the previous Hebrew and French.

In 2006, an Israeli passport became an accepted form of identification in elections in Israel. Previously, only an internal identity card was accepted for this purpose.

Denial or withdrawal of an Israeli passport is one of the sanctions an Israeli rabbinical court may use to enforce divorce upon a husband who chains his wife into marriage against her will.

Since 2013, biometric passports have been introduced, in line with standards used by the United States, European Union and other countries. To obtain a biometric passport, an applicant must appear in an Interior Ministry office "to be photographed by the special camera which records information such as facial bone structure, distance between one's eyes, ears to eyes and ratio of facial features one from another. One will also be fingerprinted and all this information will be contained in the new high-tech electronic passport."

== Physical appearance ==
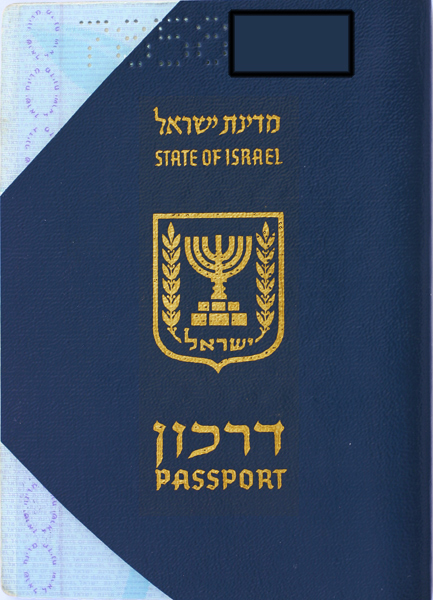
Front cover of a non-biometric Israeli passport (revoked document with clipped corners), 2008

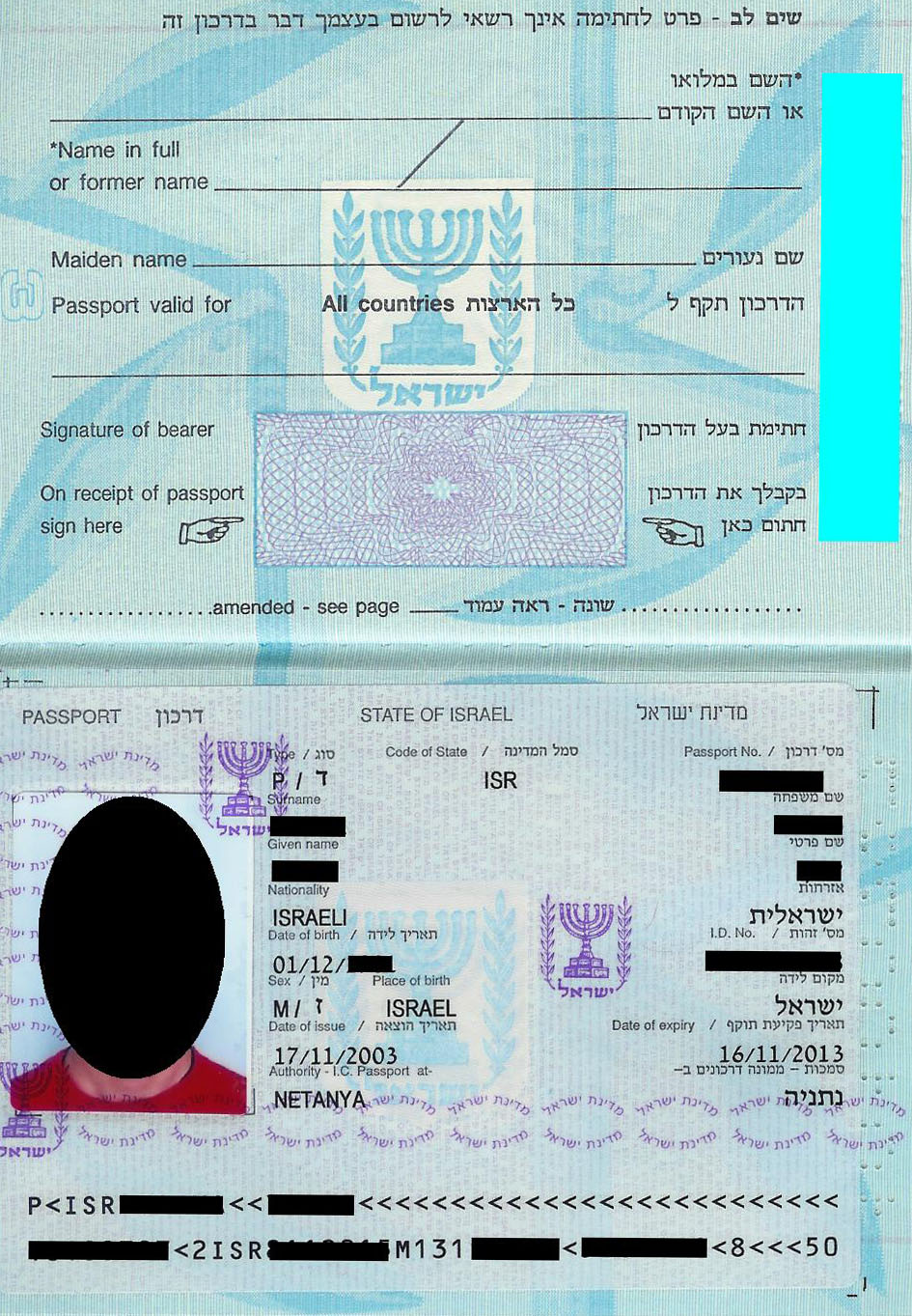
Personal data page on a non-biometric Israeli passport, 2006

=== Colour, language, and symbols ===
The current passport is navy blue and has the Israeli national emblem in the centre of the front cover, below the inscriptions "מדינת ישראל" and "STATE OF ISRAEL" in Hebrew and English, respectively. The words "דרכון" and "PASSPORT" are inscribed below the emblem, and the biometric symbol is inscribed at the bottom. Following the national emblem's theme, the passport's inner pages are decorated with olive branches and the temple menorah. The regular passport contains 32 pages and the business passport contains 64 pages.

Israeli passports are valid for up to a maximum of 10 years for all citizens aged 18 or older. Although they are written in both Hebrew and English, the direction of the page order (right-to-left) is dictated by Hebrew. Hebrew is the sole official language in Israel and the Israeli government recognizes Arabic as having a non-official special status in the country, but it is not used on passports. However, Israeli identity cards are co-written in Arabic.

==== Declaration of freedom of movement ====
There is a declaration from the Ministry of Interior written in Hebrew and English on the passport:

שר הפנים של מדינת ישראל מבקש בזה את כל הנוגעים בדבר להרשות לנושא דרכון זה לעבור ללא עכוב והפרעה ולהושיט לו במקרה הצורך את ההגנה והעזרה הדרושה.

The Minister of the Interior of the State of Israel hereby requests all those whom it may concern to allow the bearer of this passport to pass freely without let or hindrance and to afford him such assistance and protection as may be necessary.

==== Property advisory information ====
On the back cover of the passport, there is a government advisory written only in Hebrew (English translation below):

דרכון זה הוא קניינה של מדינת ישראל והינו מסמך בעל ערך שיש לשמור עליו בקפדנות. אסור להוסיף, למחוק פרט כלשהו בדרכון, לתלוש דף או דפים ממנו, להשמיד או להשחית את הדרכון. החוק קובע שהמבצע פעולה כזו וכן מי שמשתמש שלא כחוק בדרכון שאינו שלו או מניח לאדם אחר להשתמש שלא כחוק בדרכונו, עובר עבירה פלילית ועלול להיענש.

אזרח ישראלי שהוא גם אזרח חוץ ובעל דרכון זר חייב להיכנס לישראל ולצאת ממנה בדרכון או בתעודת מעבר ישראליים.

במקרה של אובדן גניבת הדרכון בארץ, על בעל הדרכון להודיע על כך מיד ללשכת רשות האוכלוסין באיזור מגוריו. אבד או נגנב הדרכון בחו"ל, יש למסור הודעה על כך לשגרירות או לקונסוליה הישראלית הקרובה למקום הימצאו.

שמור היטב על דרכונך לבל יאבד. בעת השימוש בו, יש להחזיקו בכיס פנימי ובטוח של בגדיך ולא בתיק או במכונית. ביציאתך לחו"ל מומלץ להצטייד בצילום של דף הפרטים.

הדרכון תקף לכל הארצות (אלא אם צוין אחרת) עד לתאריך הרשום בעמוד 2. לאחר תום התוקף, או אם הדרכון נתמלא או נתבלה יש להחליפו בחדש.

לתשומת לבך!!! דרכון זה מכיל מעגלים אלקטרוניים רגישים. לתפקוד מיטבי של מעגלים אלה, נא לא לקפל, לנקב ו/או לחשוף את הדרכון לטמפרטורות גבוהות ו/או ללחות מופרזת.

This passport is the property of the State of Israel and is a valuable document which must be preserved carefully. Do not add or delete any information in the passport, tear out a page or pages from it, or destroy or corrupt the passport. The law states that the perpetrator of such action and who uses an illegal passport that is not his or lets anyone else use his passport illegally, has committed an offense and is liable to be punished.

An Israeli citizen who is also a foreign citizen and holds a foreign passport must enter and exit Israel with an Israeli passport or travel document.

In the case of loss or theft of the passport in Israel, the nearest Population Office must be immediately notified. If the passport is lost or stolen overseas, the nearest Israeli embassy or consulate must be notified.

Be careful not to lose your passport. When you use it, keep it secured inside the pocket of your clothes and not in your bag or car. When you travel abroad, it is recommended to bring a photocopy of the information page.

The passport is valid for all countries (unless otherwise noted) until the date listed on page 2. After expiration, or if your passport has worn thin or is filled, it must be replaced with a new one.

Attention!!! This passport contains sensitive electronic circuits. For optimal functioning of these circuits, please do not fold, puncture and/or expose your passport to high temperatures and/or excessive moisture.

=== Personal data page ===
An Israeli passport holder's personal data can be found on page 2, and includes the following:

- Photo of passport holder on the left
- Type (P/ד) סוג
- Code of State (ISR) סמל המדינה
- Passport no. מס דרכון
- Israeli ID no. מס זהות
- Surname שם משפחה
- Given name שם פרטי
- Nationality אזרחות
- Date of birth תאריך לידה
- Sex מין
- Place of birth מקום לידה
- Date of issue תאריך הוצאה
- Date of expiry תאריך פקיעת תוקף
- Authority (- I.C. Passport at) סמכות (- ממונה דרכונים ב)
- Signature of bearer (in biometric passport) חתימת בעל הדרכון

All of the holder's information appears in Hebrew and English, and the page ends with the Machine Readable Zone. In non-biometric passports, the bearer signature follows on page 3.

== Travel document ==
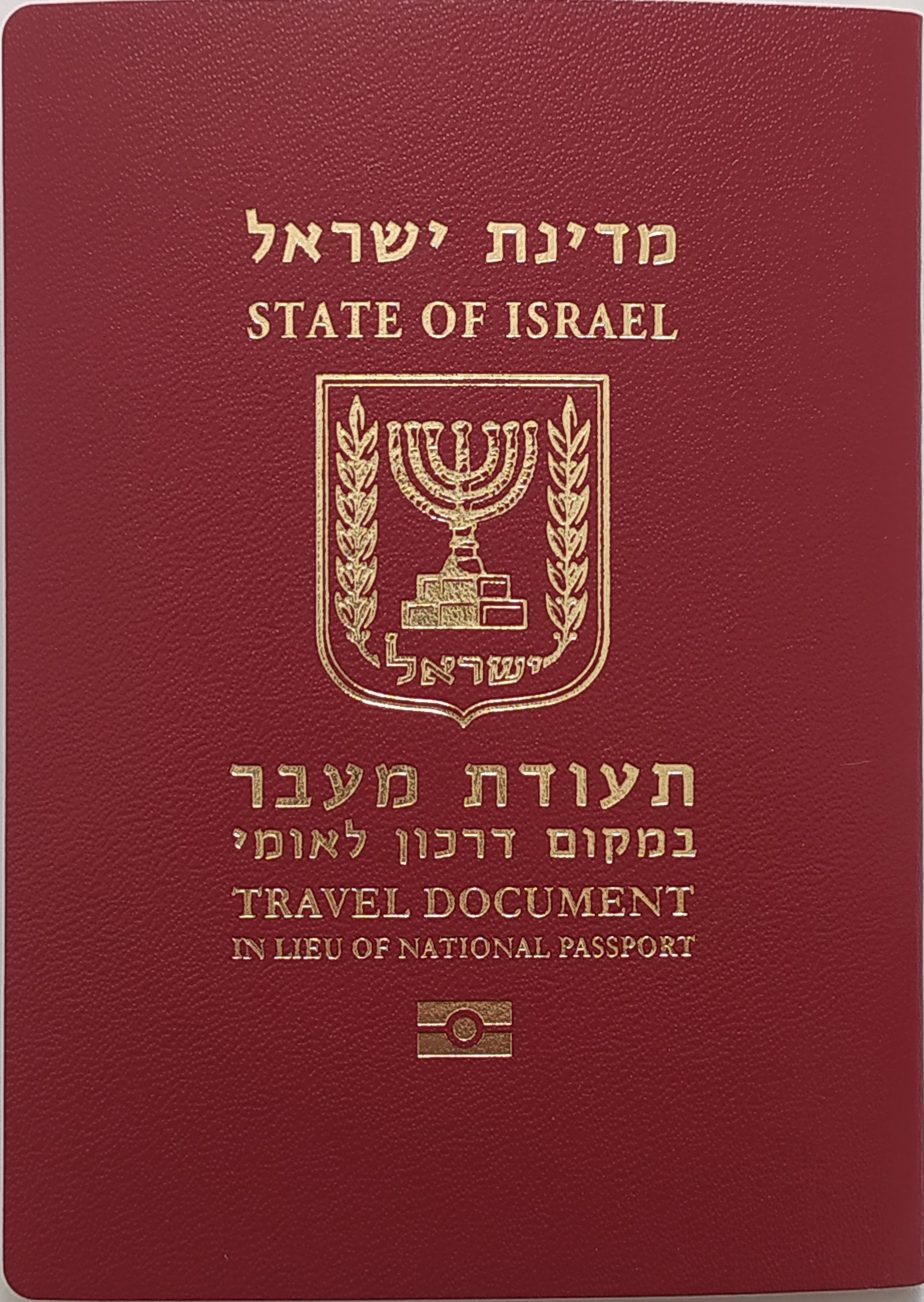
Front cover of an Israeli travel document in lieu of national passport with biometrics, 2023

Israel may issue a travel document (Hebrew: תעודת מעבר Teudat Ma'avar) to a person who does not have any passport or to a new Israeli citizen (ole/ola hadash). It may be issued in the following circumstances:

- to a non-Israeli resident or foreigner who does not have another passport or defined citizenship (i.e., a stateless person), allowing them to leave the country. Examples include cases of foreigners who have infiltrated Israel illegally and are due to be deported, or foreigners who need to leave the country for any other reason and are unable to obtain a passport from another country;
- to Israeli citizens in lieu of a passport, such as for those who lost their passport(s) overseas.

While the State of Israel does not guarantee visa-free entrance to relevant countries with the travel document, in fact, all of the Schengen Zone countries (except for Malta), as well as many other countries like Japan, South Korea and others do recognize it for visa-free travel, if the holder of the document is an Israeli citizen. The travel document in lieu of national passport has document code 'PP', which stands for 'provisional passport'. That effectively means the document has the status of the passport.

=== For non-citizen Arabs ===
A special travel document (Hebrew: תעודת מעבר ישראלית לזרים Teudat Ma'avar Israelit Lezarim) may be issued to the Arab residents of East Jerusalem who do not hold pre-1967 Jordanian citizenship, and to Arab residents of the Golan Heights who do not hold Israeli citizenship.

=== In Lieu of National Passport ===
A Travel Document in Lieu of National Passport (Hebrew: תעודת מעבר במקום דרכון לאומי Teudat Ma'avar Bimkom Darkon Leumi) may be issued to an Israeli citizen by the Ministry of Interior in a number of circumstances:

- A new immigrant to Israel acquires Israeli nationality immediately when issued with a certificate of immigration (תעודת עולה teudat oleh) upon their arrival in the country, but this nationality may be waived with retroactive effect to the moment the certificate of immigration was issued if such an application is filed with the Interior Ministry within 90 days of the issuance of the certificate of immigration. During these 90 days, a new immigrant cannot apply for an Israeli passport or travel document unless they file a waiver of the right to waive the automatic acquisition of Israeli nationality. A new immigrant cannot get an Israeli passport until they have resided in Israel for a period of at least a year following their immigration;
- Foreigners or stateless residents, and refugees;
- Israeli citizens with a criminal record;
- Israeli citizens who have lost or destroyed over three passports;
- Israeli citizens who have lost their passport during an overseas trip;
- Israeli citizens who are returning to Israel by the decision of the Israeli government.

They are typically valid for two years, and not for more than five years. The issuance of travel documents instead of passports became prevalent in the 1990s, as the Israeli government prepared a national response to a wave of Russian organized crime gangs who had begun using Israeli passports for their activities globally.

== Visa requirements map ==
Visa requirements by country for Israeli citizens: State of Israel Visa-free entry Visa-on-arrival entry E-Visa Visa available online or on arrival Visa required prior to arrival Travel banned by the host countries due to safety concerns or admission refused

According to the 2018 Henley Passport Index, Israeli citizens had visa-free or visa on arrival access to 161 countries and territories, ranking the Israeli passport 21st in the world in terms of travel freedom (tied with the Barbadian passport and the Emirati passport). Additionally, Arton Capital's Passport Index ranked the Israeli passport 16th in the world in terms of travel freedom, with a visa-free score of 146, as of 2 December 2018.

=== Designated "enemy states" ===
The Arab–Israeli conflict has had a profound effect, both internally and externally, on Israel's passport policy. Under the Prevention of Infiltration Law of 1954, the Israeli government designated Lebanon, Egypt, Syria, Saudi Arabia, Jordan, Iraq, and Yemen as enemy states. However, Egypt and Jordan were dropped from this designation after the 1979 Egypt–Israel peace treaty and the 1994 Israel–Jordan peace treaty. In 1979, Iran became the first non-Arab country to be designated by Israel as an enemy state, owing to the Islamic Revolution and the subsequent Iran–Israel proxy war. Israeli citizens are prohibited from visiting designated enemy states without a special permit issued by the Interior Ministry. In January 2020, as part of further developments for Israeli–Saudi normalization, Israel's Interior Ministry announced that Israeli Muslims were now eligible to travel to Saudi Arabia for religious purposes (i.e., Umrah and Hajj), while Israeli Jews could visit the country for business purposes.

==== Countries that do not accept Israeli passports ====
Overview of restrictions on Israelis' travel freedoms in 2025: State of Israel Countries that reject Israeli passports Countries that reject Israeli passports and non-Israeli passports that have a used/unused Israeli visa stamp, Egyptian / Jordanian border stamps issued at a crossing with Israel or have been used for any form of travel to Israel* *Included in this category is Iraq, but not Iraq's autonomous Kurdistan Region, which does accept Israeli visitors with full freedom of movement (see Israel–Kurdistan Region relations)

As of 2025, 28 countries do not recognize Israel's sovereignty. 25 of these are Muslim-majority countries, of which 16 explicitly do not process Israeli passport holders, and a further 7 of those 16 do not admit entry to non-Israelis with any sort of ties to Israel, including evidence of visits or planned visits to Israel, such as passport stamps from Israel, used or unused Israeli visas, and evidence of visiting Egypt and/or Jordan via Israeli border crossings. In addition, entry to Palestine is subject to separate restrictions.

Afghanistan; Algeria; Bangladesh; Brunei; Iran; Iraq^{A}; Kuwait; Lebanon; Palestine^{F}	Libya; Malaysia^{B}; Maldives; Oman^{C}; Pakistan^{D}; Saudi Arabia^{E}; Syria; Yemen

- A: Except for the autonomous Kurdistan Region;
- B: Unless a clearance permit is obtained from the Ministry of Home Affairs in addition to a visa prior to arrival;
- C: Except for transit;
- D: Unless a visa and police registration are obtained.
- E: Since 2020, exceptions granted for religious purposes (for Israeli Muslims) and business purposes (for other Israelis)
- F: Entry to Palestine is generally prohibited for Israeli citizens, specifically to Area A of the West Bank, and entry to Gaza requires exceptional authorization.

The aforementioned 7 countries— Afghanistan, Iran, Kuwait, Lebanon, Libya, Syria and Yemen—do not allow entry to non-Israelis with evidence of travel to Israel, or whose passports have a used or unused Israeli visa. In addition, these countries may also deny entry to non-Israelis if their passport contains an Egyptian or Jordanian border stamp issued at a crossing with Israel, as this would indicate that the person has traveled to Israel.

Consequently, many countries may issue a second passport to citizens wishing to circumvent this restriction, and the Israeli immigration services have now mostly ceased stamping entry or exit stamps in all Israeli and non-Israeli passports.

== Gallery ==
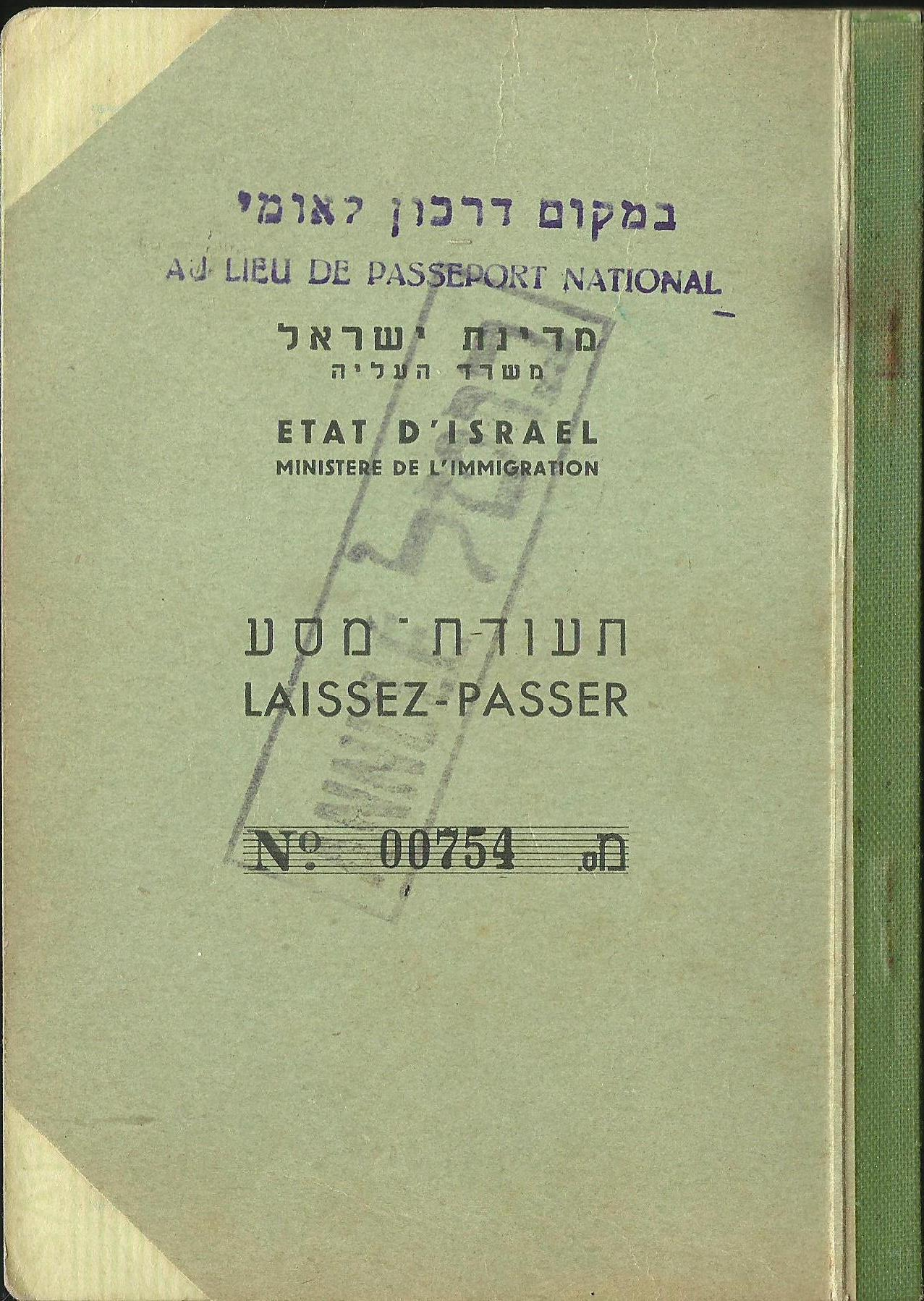
An example of Israel's first travel document, dating from December 1948.

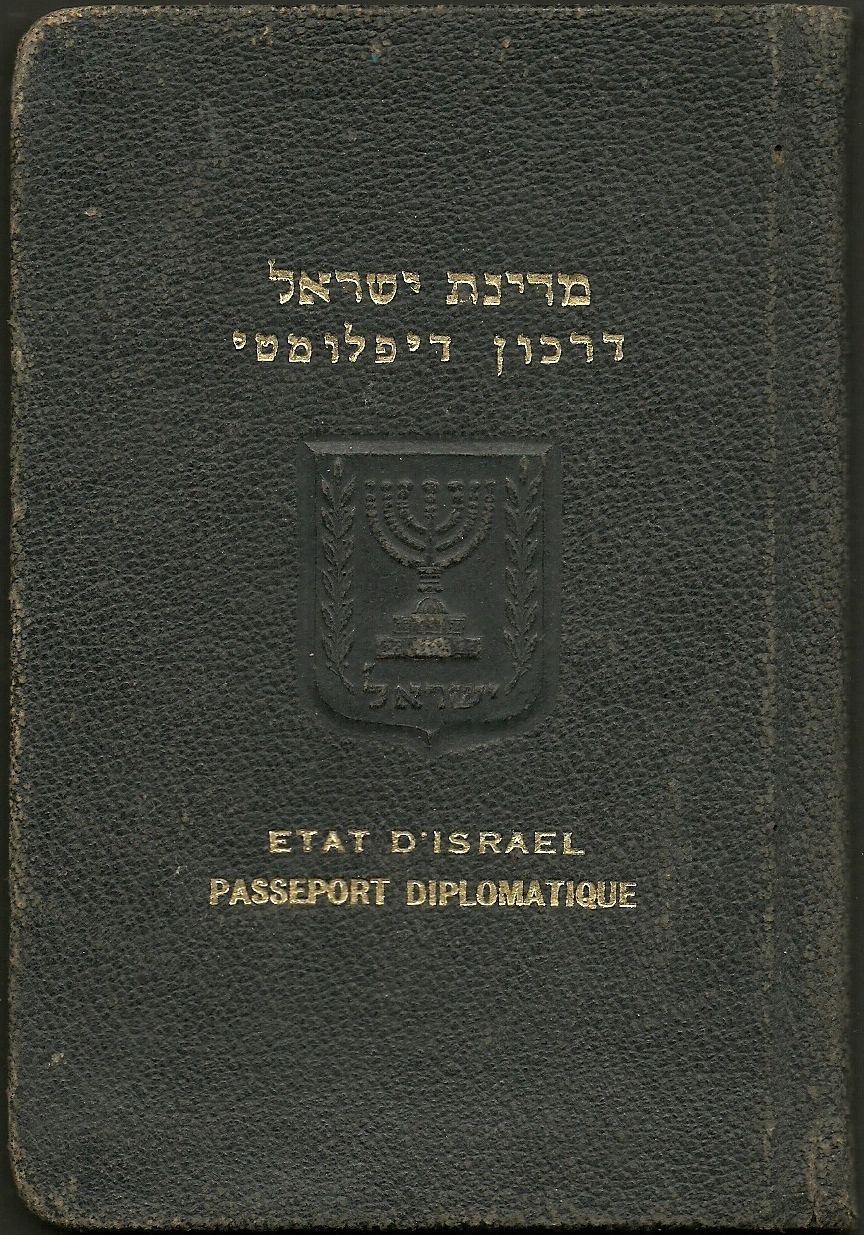
Example of an early Israeli diplomatic passport, 1951

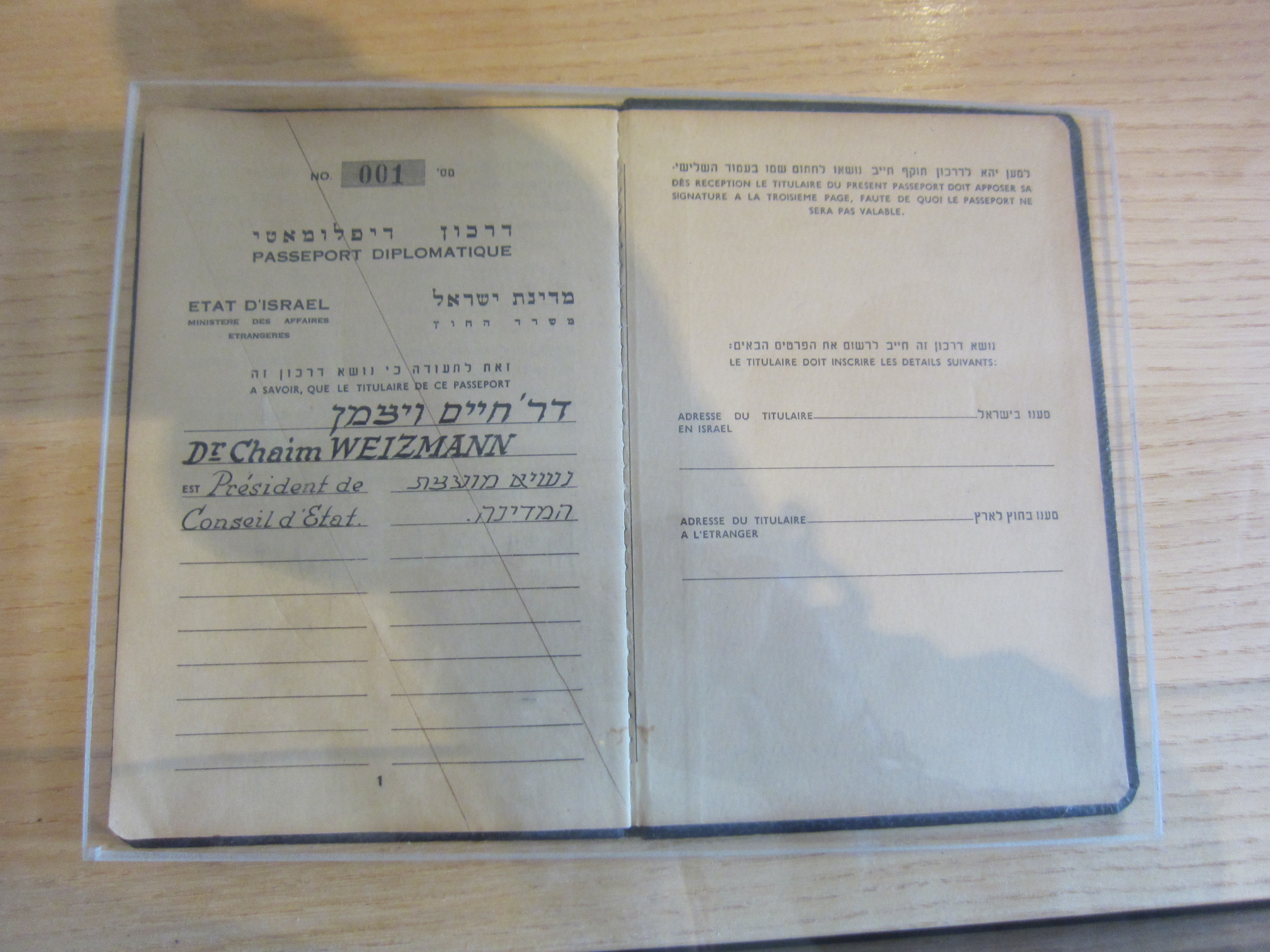
Israeli Diplomatic Passport No. 1, belonging to Chaim Weizmann.

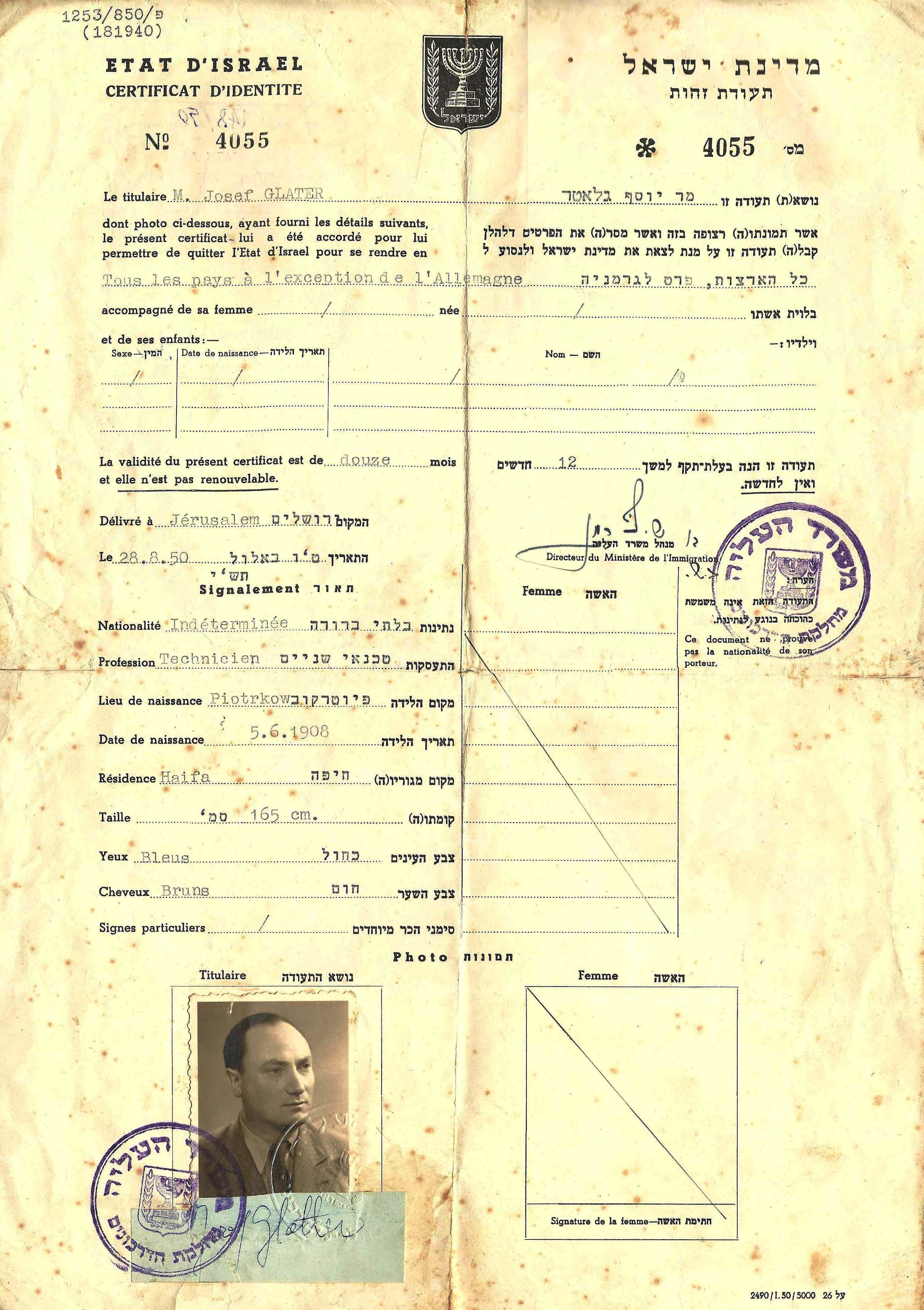
1950 Israel travel identity document issued to those lacking an official passport.

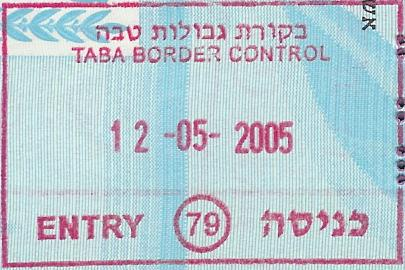
An Israeli entry stamp in an Israeli non-biometric ordinary passport

== See also ==
- Visa policy of Israel
- Visa requirements for Israeli citizens
- Israeli citizenship law
- Israeli identity card
