= Visa requirements for Afghan citizens =

Administrative entry restrictions

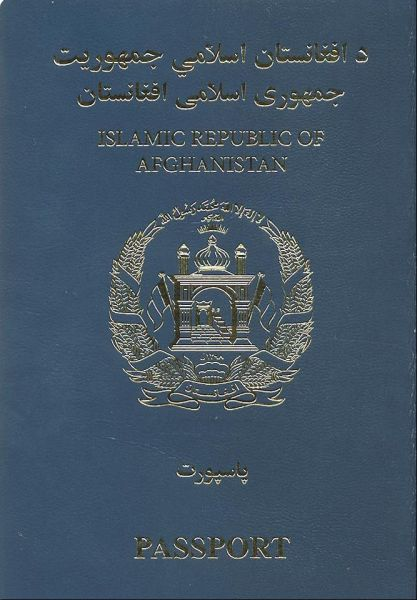
Afghan passport (2017–present design)

Visa requirements for Afghan citizens are administrative entry restrictions by the authorities of other states placed on citizens of Afghanistan.

As of 2026, Afghan citizens had visa-free or visa on arrival access to only 24 countries and territories, ranking the Afghanistan passport 101st and worst in the world according to the Henley Passport Index.

Obtaining foreign visas from within Afghanistan is difficult as many embassies in Afghanistan have closed since Taliban takeover of the government in August 2021. Prices of Afghan passports have risen dramatically as a result of broken down bureaucracy and increased demand.

== Visa requirements map ==
Visa requirements for Afghan citizens holding ordinary passports Afghanistan Visa not required Visa not required (conditional) Visa on arrival eVisa Visa available both on arrival or online Visa required Admission restricted

== Visa requirements ==
Country	Visa requirement	Allowed stay	Notes (excluding departure fees)
Albania	eVisa	90 days	
Algeria	Visa required		Visitors on tours organized to some southern regions by an approved travel agency may obtain a visa on arrival for up to 30 days.
Andorra	Visa required		
Angola	eVisa	30 days	
Antigua and Barbuda	eVisa		
Argentina	Visa required		
Armenia	Visa required		
Australia	Visa required		May apply online (Online Visitor e600 visa).
Austria	Visa required		
Azerbaijan	Visa required		
Bahamas	eVisa		
Bahrain	eVisa / Visa on arrival	14 days	Travelers must have a valid visa for the United Arab Emirates, the United Kingdom, United States, a Schengen country, United States green card or Saudi Arabia (excluding Hajj and Umrah visas).
Bangladesh	Visa required		
Barbados	Visa required		
Belarus	Visa required		Registration upon arrival for stays longer than five days is mandatory.
Belgium	Visa required		
Belize	Visa required		
Benin	eVisa	30 days	Three types of electronic visa are offered: the e-Visa valid for 30 days for a single entry (50 EUR), the e-Visa valid for 30 days for several (multiple) entries (75 EUR), and the e-Visa valid for 90 days to make several (multiple) entries (100 EUR).
Bhutan	eVisa	90 days	The Sustainable Development Fee (SDF) of 200 USD per person, per night for almost all visitors to Bhutan. Additionally, if payment is made in US dollars from September 1, 2023 to August 31, 2027, the SDF is 100 USD.
Bolivia	Online Visa		
Bosnia and Herzegovina	Visa required		
Botswana	eVisa	3 months	
Brazil	Visa required		
Brunei	Visa required		
Bulgaria	Visa required		
Burkina Faso	eVisa		
Burundi	Online Visa / Visa on arrival	1 month	
Cambodia	eVisa / Visa on arrival	30 days	
Cameroon	eVisa		
Canada	Visa required		Afghans who worked for the Canadian government (military or development projects) may be eligible for resettlement under the Special Immigration Measures (SIM) Program, an initiative managed by Immigration, Refugees and Citizenship Canada (IRCC).
Cape Verde	Visa required		
Central African Republic	Visa required		
Chad	eVisa		
Chile	Visa required		
China	Visa required		24-hour visa-free transit through any international airports of China (except Ürümqi), allows domestic travel through different airports. (Note: Custom procedure for 24-hour visa-free transit is required in principle, except in Beijing (both Capital and Daxing), Shanghai Pudong, Hangzhou, Xiamen, Guangzhou, Shenzhen, Chengdu Tianfu and Xi'an if no leaving of international transit areas.)
Colombia	Online Visa		
Comoros	Visa on arrival	45 days	
Republic of the Congo	Visa required		
Democratic Republic of the Congo	eVisa	7 days	
Costa Rica	Visa required		
Côte d'Ivoire	eVisa	3 months	
Croatia	Visa required		
Cuba	eVisa	90 days	From 2025, the Tourist card will be replaced by an e-Visa. This will be valid until June 30.
Cyprus	Visa required		
Czech Republic	Visa required		
Denmark	Visa required		
Djibouti	eVisa	90 days	
Dominica	Visa not required	21 days	
Dominican Republic	Visa required		
Ecuador	Visa required		
Egypt	Visa not required (conditional)	3 months	Visa not required for passengers aged 50 years and above or 16 years and below.
El Salvador	Visa required		
Equatorial Guinea	eVisa		
Eritrea	Visa required		
Estonia	Visa required		
Eswatini	Visa required		
Ethiopia	Visa required		Credit card payment transactions are not accepted when applying for e-Visa.
Fiji	Online Visa		
Finland	Visa required		
France	Visa required		
Gabon	eVisa	90 days	
Gambia	Visa required		
Georgia	Visa required		All residents of Saudi Arabia (including Afghan nationality) can obtain a tourist visa on arrival at Tbilisi Airport.
Germany	Visa required		Afghans who worked for the German Government may be eligible for assistance leaving Afghanistan.
Ghana	Visa required		
Greece	Visa required		
Grenada	Visa required		
Guatemala	Visa required		
Guinea	eVisa	90 days	
Guinea-Bissau	Visa on arrival	90 days	
Guyana	eVisa		
Haiti	Visa not required	3 months	
Honduras	Visa required		
Hungary	Visa required		
Iceland	Visa required		
India	eVisa	30 days	
Indonesia	Visa required		Afghan citizens are subject to the calling visa category, a designation applied to nationals considered to have specific vulnerabilities or risks related to ideology, politics, the economy, society, culture, security, or immigration.; Prior approval from the Directorate General of Immigration in Jakarta is required before they can apply for a visa.; In addition to holding a visa, travelers must obtain a reference letter from the Directorate General of Immigration and present the invitation letter submitted with their visa application prior to traveling to Indonesia.
Iran	Visa required		
Iraq	eVisa	30 days	
Ireland	Visa required		
Israel	Visa required		Confirmation from the Israeli Foreign Ministry before a visa is issued.
Italy	Visa required		
Jamaica	Visa required		
Japan	Visa required		Nationals who reside in Saudi Arabia (Including Afghan nationality) are able to apply for a tourist visa online (Single entry visa for a stay up to 90 days).
Jordan	Visa required		
Kazakhstan	Visa required		
Kenya	Electronic Travel Authorisation	90 days	Applications can be submitted up to 90 days prior to travel and must be submitted at least 3 days in advance.; eTA fee is 32.50 USD.; Proof of reservation at the hotel where visitors plan to stay is required (if staying with friends, an invitation letter is also acceptable).; Yellow fever vaccination certificate is required if coming from endemic countries.
Kiribati	Visa required		
North Korea	Visa required		
South Korea	Visa required		
Kuwait	Visa required		
Kyrgyzstan	eVisa	60 days	
Laos	Visa required		
Latvia	Visa required		
Lebanon	Visa required		
Lesotho	Visa required		
Liberia	e-VOA	3 months	
Libya	Visa required		
Liechtenstein	Visa required		
Lithuania	Visa required		
Luxembourg	Visa required		
Madagascar	eVisa / Visa on arrival	90 days	For stays of 61 to 90 days, the visa fee is 59 USD.
Malawi	eVisa	30 days	
Malaysia	eVisa	30 days	
Maldives	Free visa on arrival	30 days	
Mali	Visa required		
Malta	Visa required		
Marshall Islands	Visa required		
Mauritania	eVisa	30 days	Available at Nouakchott–Oumtounsy International Airport.
Mauritius	Visa required		
Mexico	Visa required		Visa is not required for Holders of a valid visa of Canada, US, UK or a Schengen State and Permanent residence of Canada, Chile, Colombia, Schengen State, Japan, UK, US; Entry may be refused by immigration officials for individuals who were previously denied a US visa, even if holding a valid Mexican visa.
Micronesia	Visa not required	30 days	
Moldova	Visa required		Citizens holding a residence permit or a valid visa issued by one of the member states of the European Union or one of the parties to the Schengen Agreement can apply for an electronic visa.
Monaco	Visa required		
Mongolia	Visa required		
Montenegro	Visa required		
Morocco	Visa required		
Mozambique	eVisa / Visa on arrival	30 days	
Myanmar	Visa required		
Namibia	eVisa	3 months	
Nauru	Visa required		
Nepal	Visa required		
Netherlands	Visa required		
New Zealand	Admission restricted		Islamic Emirate of Afghanistan passports issued prior to 2004 and after 2021 do not meet the requirements of a passport or certificate of identity under New Zealand immigration law; these passports are therefore unacceptable for travel to New Zealand and visas will not be endorsed in them.; Passports issued by the Islamic Republic of Afghanistan between 2004 and 2021 are recognised.; Holders of an Australian Permanent Resident Visa or Resident Return Visa in an acceptable travel document may be granted a New Zealand Resident Visa on arrival permitting indefinite stay (under the Trans-Tasman Travel Arrangement), subject to meeting character requirements and obtaining an Electronic Travel Authority before departure.
Nicaragua	Visa required		Visa on arrival if holding valid visas of United States, Canada, and Schengen Member state
Niger	Visa required		
Nigeria	eVisa	30 days	
North Macedonia	Visa required		
Norway	Visa required		
Oman	Visa required		
Pakistan	eVisa	3 months	
Palau	Visa on arrival	30 days	
Panama	Visa required		
Papua New Guinea	eVisa	60 days	Visitors may apply for a visa online under the "Tourist - Own Itinerary" category.
Paraguay	Visa required		
Peru	Visa required		
Philippines	Visa required		Residents of the United Arab Emirates may obtain an eVisa through the official Philippine eVisa website. A valid Emirati residence visa must be shown upon an e-Visa application.
Poland	Visa required		
Portugal	Visa required		
Qatar	eVisa		Visitors can apply for a visa on the Hayya website.
Romania	Visa required		
Russia	Visa required		
Rwanda	eVisa / Visa on arrival	30 days	
Saint Kitts and Nevis	eVisa	30 days	
Saint Lucia	Visa required		
Saint Vincent and the Grenadines	Visa required		
Samoa	Entry permit on arrival	90 days	
San Marino	Visa required		
São Tomé and Príncipe	Visa required		
Saudi Arabia	Visa required		
Senegal	Visa required		
Serbia	eVisa	90 days	90 days within any 180-day period. Transfers allowed.
Seychelles	Electronic Border System	3 months	Application can be submitted up to 30 days before travel.; Visitors must upload a reservation confirmation(s) for each visitor's location of stay in Seychelles.; Yellow fever vaccination certificate is required if coming from endemic countries.; Payment of the fee (EUR 10) by credit or debit card.; Valid for one journey only and it expires once exit the country.
Sierra Leone	eVisa	3 months	
Singapore	Visa required		
Slovakia	Visa required		
Slovenia	Visa required		
Solomon Islands	Visa required		
Somalia	eVisa	30 days	
South Africa	Electronic travel authorisation		
South Sudan	eVisa		Obtainable online.; Printed visa authorization must be presented at the time of travel.
Spain	Visa required		
Sri Lanka	ETA / Visa on arrival	30 days	
Sudan	Visa required		
Suriname	eVisa	90 days	
Sweden	Visa required		
Switzerland	Visa required		
Syria	eVisa		
Tajikistan	Visa required		
Tanzania	eVisa		
Thailand	eVisa	60 days	
Timor-Leste	Visa on arrival	30 days	
Togo	eVisa	15 days	
Tonga	Visa required		
Trinidad and Tobago	eVisa	90 days	
Tunisia	Visa required		
Turkey	Visa required		
Turkmenistan	Visa required		When transiting between two non-bordering countries, visitors can obtain a Turkmenistan transit visa for a five-day stay. This must be applied for in advance at the Turkmenistan Embassy. Visitors must also submit copies of the visas for the country of entry into Turkmenistan and the country of departure from Turkmenistan. Visa fee is 20 USD.
Tuvalu	Visa on arrival	1 month	
Uganda	eVisa	3 months	
Ukraine	Visa required		
United Arab Emirates	Visa required		May apply using 'Smart service'.
United Kingdom	Visa required		
United States	Admission restricted		Effective June 9, 2025, U.S. visas will no longer be issued to citizens of 12 countries, with certain exemptions.; Afghans who worked for or on behalf of the U.S. Government, ISAF, or R.S. for more than one year may be eligible for a Special Immigrant Visa; Afghans who have worked for US-based NGOs, media organizations, or for/on behalf of the U.S. government for less than one year may be eligible for Refugee Admissions Program Priority 2 Designation
Uruguay	Visa required		
Uzbekistan	Visa required		
Vanuatu	eVisa	120 days	
Vatican City	Visa required		
Venezuela	eVisa		
Vietnam	eVisa		e-Visa is valid for 90 days and multiple entry.; Only Phú Quốc island has a visa exemption for up to 30 days.
Yemen	Visa required		Yemen introduced an e-Visa system for visitors who meet certain eligibility requirements (group travel of 10 or more people, business trips, and transit etc.).
Zambia	eVisa	90 days	
Zimbabwe	eVisa	1 month	

== Territories and disputed areas ==
Visa requirements for Afghan citizens for visits to various territories, disputed areas, and restricted zones:

Visitor to	Visa requirement	Notes (excluding departure fees)
Africa
British Indian Ocean Territory	Special permit required	Special Permit required.
Eritrea (outside Asmara)	Travel permit required	To travel in the rest of Eritrea, a Travel Permit for Foreigners is required (20 Eritrean nakfa)
Ascension Island	eVisa	3 months within any year.
Saint Helena	eVisa	
Tristan da Cunha	Visa required	Permission to land required for 15/30 pounds sterling (yacht/ship passenger) for Tristan da Cunha Island or 20 pounds sterling for Gough Island, Inaccessible Island or Nightingale Islands.
Sahrawi Arab Democratic Republic (Western Sahara controlled territory)	Unknown	
Somaliland	Visa required	
Asia
Hong Kong	eVisa	
India PAP/RAP	PAP/RAP required	Protected Area Permit (PAP) required for all of Arunachal Pradesh, Manipur, Mizoram and parts of Himachal Pradesh, Jammu and Kashmir and Uttarakhand. A restricted Area Permit (RAP) is required for all of Andaman and Nicobar Islands and Lakshadweep and parts of Sikkim. Some of these requirements are occasionally lifted for a year.
Macau	Visa on arrival	
North Korea outside Pyongyang	Special permit required	People are not allowed to leave the capital city; tourists can only leave the capital with a governmental tourist guide (no independent travel)
Palestine	Visa required	
Taiwan	Visa required	Afghan citizens are subject to special visa requirements and may only visit Taiwan under specific conditions, including official invitations, business activities, medical treatment, family visits, or participation in approved events.; Those visiting Taiwan on business must be interviewed by a Taiwanese consular officer, and their sponsors must submit a letter of guarantee to the Bureau of Consular Affairs in Taiwan.
Tajikistan Gorno-Badakhshan Autonomous Province	Special permits required	OIVR permit required (15+5 Tajikistani Somoni) and another special permit (free of charge) is required for Lake Sarez.
Tibet Autonomous Region	Travel permit required	Tibet Travel Permit required (10 USD).
UN Korean Demilitarized Zone	Restricted zone	
United Nations UNDOF Zone and Ghajar	Restricted zone	
Caribbean and North Atlantic
Anguilla	eVisa	
Aruba	Visa required	
Bermuda	Visa required	
Netherlands Bonaire, St. Eustatius and Saba	Visa required	
British Virgin Islands	Visa required	
Cayman Islands	Visa required	
Curacao	Visa required	
France French Guiana	Visa required	
France French West Indies	Visa required	
Montserrat	eVisa	
Puerto Rico	Visa required	
Sint Maarten	Visa required	
Turks and Caicos Islands	Visa required	
U.S. Virgin Islands	Visa required	
Europe
Abkhazia	Visa required	Tourists from all countries (except Georgia) can visit Abkhazia for a period not exceeding 24 hours as part of an organized tourist group.
Kosovo	Visa required	
Mount Athos	Special permit required	Special permit required (4 days: €25 for Orthodox visitors, €35 for non-Orthodox visitors, €18 for students). There is a visitors' quota: a maximum of 100 Orthodox and ten non-Orthodox per day, and women are not allowed.
Turkish Republic of Northern Cyprus	Visa not required	
United Nations UN Buffer Zone in Cyprus	Access permit required	Access Permit is required for traveling inside the zone, except in Civil Use Areas.
Gibraltar	Visa required	
Norway Jan Mayen	Permit required	Permit issued by the local police required for a stay of fewer than 24 hours and Permit issued by the Norwegian police for staying more than 24 hours.
South Ossetia	Visa required	To enter South Ossetia, visitors must have a multiple-entry visa for Russia and register their stay with the Migration Service of the Ministry of Internal Affairs within 3 days.
Transnistria	Visa not required	Registration is required after 24h.
Oceania
American Samoa	Visa required	
(Australia) Ashmore and Cartier Islands	Authoristion required	Special authorization required.
(France) Clipperton Island	Special permit required	Special permit required.
Cook Islands	Visa not required	31 days
French Polynesia	Visa required	
Guam	Visa required	
Niue	Visa not required	
Pitcairn Islands	Visa not required	14 days visa-free and landing fee of 35 USD or tax of 5 USD if not going ashore.
United States Minor Outlying Islands	Special permit required	Special permits required for Baker Island, Howland Island, Jarvis Island, Johnston Atoll, Kingman Reef, Midway Atoll, Palmyra Atoll and Wake Island.
South Atlantic and Antarctica
Falkland Islands	Visa required	
South Georgia and the South Sandwich Islands	Permit required	Pre-arrival permit from the Commissioner required (72 hours/1 month for 110/160 pounds sterling).
Antarctica	Special Permits Required	Special permits required for British Antarctic Territory, French Southern and Antarctic Lands, Argentine Antarctica, (Australia) Australian Antarctic Territory, (Antártica Chilena Province) Chilean Antarctic Territory, (Australia) Heard Island and McDonald Islands, (Norway) Peter I Island, (Norway) Queen Maud Land, (New Zealand) Ross Dependency.

== Non-visa restrictions ==
=== Blank passport pages ===
Many countries require a minimum number of blank pages to be available in the passport being presented, typically one or two pages. Endorsement pages, which often appear after the visa pages, are not counted as being valid or available.

=== Vaccination ===
Cover of the new International Certificate of Vaccination issued by the Bureau of Quarantine in the Philippines since 2021

The African countries of Angola, Benin, Burkina Faso, Burundi, Cameroon, Central African Republic, Democratic Republic of the Congo, Republic of the Congo, Côte d'Ivoire, Gabon, Ghana, Guinea-Bissau, Mali, Niger, Sierra Leone and Togo, South Sudan and Uganda, along with French Guiana in South America, require all incoming passengers older than nine months to one year, to have a current International Certificate of Vaccination or Prophylaxis.

Some other countries require vaccination only if the passenger is coming from an infected area or has visited one recently or has transited for 12 hours in those countries: Algeria, Botswana, Cabo Verde, Chad, Djibouti, Egypt, Eswatini, Ethiopia, Gambia, Ghana, Guinea, Lesotho, Libya, Equatorial Guinea, Eritrea, Madagascar, Malawi, Mauritania, Mauritius, Mozambique, Namibia, Nigeria, Papua New Guinea, Seychelles, Somalia, South Africa, Sudan, Tunisia, Uganda, Tanzania, Zambia and Zimbabwe.

=== Passport validity length ===
Very few countries, such as Paraguay, just require a valid passport on arrival.

However many countries and groupings now require only an identity card – especially from their neighbours. Other countries may have special bilateral arrangements that depart from the generality of their passport validity length policies to shorten the period of passport validity required for each other's citizens or even accept passports that have already expired (but not been cancelled).

Some countries, such as Japan, Ireland and the United Kingdom, require a passport valid throughout the period of the intended stay.

In the absence of specific bilateral agreements, countries requiring passports to be valid for at least 6 more months on arrival include Afghanistan, Algeria, Anguilla, Bahrain, Bhutan, Botswana, British Virgin Islands, Brunei, Cambodia, Cameroon, Cape Verde, Cayman Islands, Central African Republic, Chad, Comoros, Costa Rica, Côte d'Ivoire, Curaçao, Ecuador, Egypt, El Salvador, Equatorial Guinea, Fiji, Gabon, Guinea Bissau, Guyana, Haiti, India, Indonesia, Iran, Iraq, Israel, Jordan, Kenya, Kiribati, Kuwait, Laos, Madagascar, Malaysia, Marshall Islands, Mongolia, Myanmar, Namibia, Nepal, Nicaragua, Nigeria, Oman, Palau, Papua New Guinea, Peru, Philippines, Qatar, Rwanda, Samoa, Saudi Arabia, Singapore, Solomon Islands, Somalia, Sri Lanka, Sudan, Suriname, Tanzania, Thailand, Timor-Leste, Tokelau, Tonga, Turkey, Tuvalu, Uganda, United Arab Emirates, Vanuatu, Venezuela, and Vietnam.

Countries requiring passports valid for at least 4 months on arrival include Micronesia and Zambia.

Countries requiring passports with a validity of at least 3 months beyond the date of intended departure include Azerbaijan, Bosnia and Herzegovina, Honduras, Montenegro, Nauru, Moldova and New Zealand. Similarly, the EEA countries of Iceland, Liechtenstein, Norway, all European Union countries (except Ireland) together with Switzerland also require 3 months validity beyond the date of the bearer's intended departure unless the bearer is an EEA or Swiss national.

Countries requiring passports valid for at least 3 months on arrival include Albania, North Macedonia, Panama, and Senegal.

Bermuda requires passports to be valid for at least 45 days upon entry.

Countries that require a passport validity of at least one month beyond the date of intended departure include Eritrea, Hong Kong, Lebanon, Macau, the Maldives and South Africa.

==== Maximum passport age ====
Countries of the Schengen area require non-EU passports to be less than 10 years old upon entry.

=== Criminal record ===
Some countries, including Australia, Canada, Fiji, New Zealand and the United States, routinely deny entry to non-citizens who have a criminal record, while others impose restrictions depending on the type of conviction and the length of the sentence.

=== Persona non grata ===
The government of a country can declare a diplomat persona non grata, banning them from entering the country or expelling them if they have already entered. In non-diplomatic use, the authorities of a country may also declare a foreigner persona non grata permanently or temporarily, usually because of unlawful activity.

=== Israeli stamps ===
Kuwait, Lebanon, Libya, and Yemen do not allow entry to people with passport stamps from Israel or whose passports have either a used or an unused Israeli visa, or where there is evidence of previous travel to Israel such as entry or exit stamps from neighbouring border posts in transit countries such as Jordan and Egypt.

To circumvent this Arab League boycott of Israel, the Israeli immigration services have now mostly ceased to stamp foreign nationals' passports on either entry to or exit from Israel (unless the entry is for some work-related purposes). Since 15 January 2013, Israel no longer stamps foreign passports at Ben Gurion Airport. Passports are still (as of 22 June 2017) stamped at Erez when passing into and out of Gaza.

Iran refuses admission to holders of passports containing an Israeli visa or stamp that is less than 12 months old.

=== Biometrics ===
Several countries mandate that all travellers, or all foreign travellers, be fingerprinted on arrival and will refuse admission to or even arrest travellers who refuse to comply. In some countries, such as the United States, this may apply even to transit passengers who merely wish to change planes rather than go landside.

Fingerprinting countries/regions include Afghanistan, Argentina, Brunei, Cambodia, China, Ethiopia, Ghana, Guinea, India, Japan, Kenya (both fingerprints and a photo are taken), Malaysia upon entry and departure, Mongolia, Saudi Arabia, the Schengen Area, Singapore, South Korea, Taiwan, Thailand, Uganda, the United Arab Emirates and the United States.

Many countries also require a photo be taken of people entering the country. The United States, which does not fully implement exit control formalities at its land frontiers (although long mandated by its own legislation), intends to implement facial recognition for passengers departing from international airports to identify people who overstay their visa.

Together with fingerprint and face recognition, iris scanning is one of three biometric identification technologies internationally standardised since 2006 by the International Civil Aviation Organization (ICAO) for use in e-passports and the United Arab Emirates conducts iris scanning on visitors who need to apply for a visa. The United States Department of Homeland Security has announced plans to greatly increase the biometric data it collects at US borders. In 2018, Singapore began trials of iris scanning at three land and maritime immigration checkpoints.

== See also ==
- Visa policy of Afghanistan
- Afghan passport
