= Etilaatroz =

News outlet in Afghanistan

- Type: Daily newspaper
- Format: Broadsheet
- Founder: Zaki Daryabi
- Publisher: Etilaatroz
- Editor-in-chief: Sakhidad Hatif
- Founded: 2012
- Language: Persian, English
- Headquarters: Silver Spring, Maryland
- Sister newspapers: kabulnow.com
- Website: etilaatroz.com

Etilaatroz (Dari: اطلاعات روز, lit. 'Daily Information'), operating in English as KabulNow, is an Afghan newspaper. In 2021, due to the Taliban's takeover of Afghanistan, the outlet moved its office to a suburb of Washington D.C. Etilaatroz is known for its in-depth investigative stories exposing high-level corruption, nepotism, systematic ethnic favoritism, and discrimination against minority ethnic groups in Afghanistan's government.

== History ==
The Etilaatroz newspaper was founded in 2012 by Zaki Daryabi, an Afghan journalist. The first edition of the outlet was printed in January 2012, but was soon shut down due to financial problems. In December 2012, after securing a contract with a publishing company, Daryabi managed to bring together a team of journalists to produce content. The Etilaatroz headquarter was based in western Kabul, an area predominantly inhabited by the Hazara people. After publishing a series of stories exposing high-level corruption within the Afghanistan government, Etilaatroz was known as a newspaper that was "rattling Afghanistan's powerful".

In the first week of September 2021, two Etilaatroz employees were detained by the Taliban while covering a women's protest in Kabul. Journalist Taqi Daryabi and photographer Neamat Naghdi were detained for 48 hours and were severely beaten. Both journalists appeared in front of the cameras with bruises and blood clots on their faces, back, waists, and legs. The pair said that they were beaten with "batons, electrical cables and whips for several hours" until they passed out. Etilaatroz was one of multiple media outlets that struggled to survive under the Taliban, but ultimately it was forced to move out of the country.

== Awards ==
In 2020, Etilaatroz was awarded the Anti-Corruption Award by Transparency International.

In 2020, Alexa ranked Etilaatroz one of the top three news websites in Afghanistan and one of the most visited Persian news outlet in the country.
