= Israeli travel document in lieu of national passport =

Travel document of the State of Israel issued to Israeli citizens

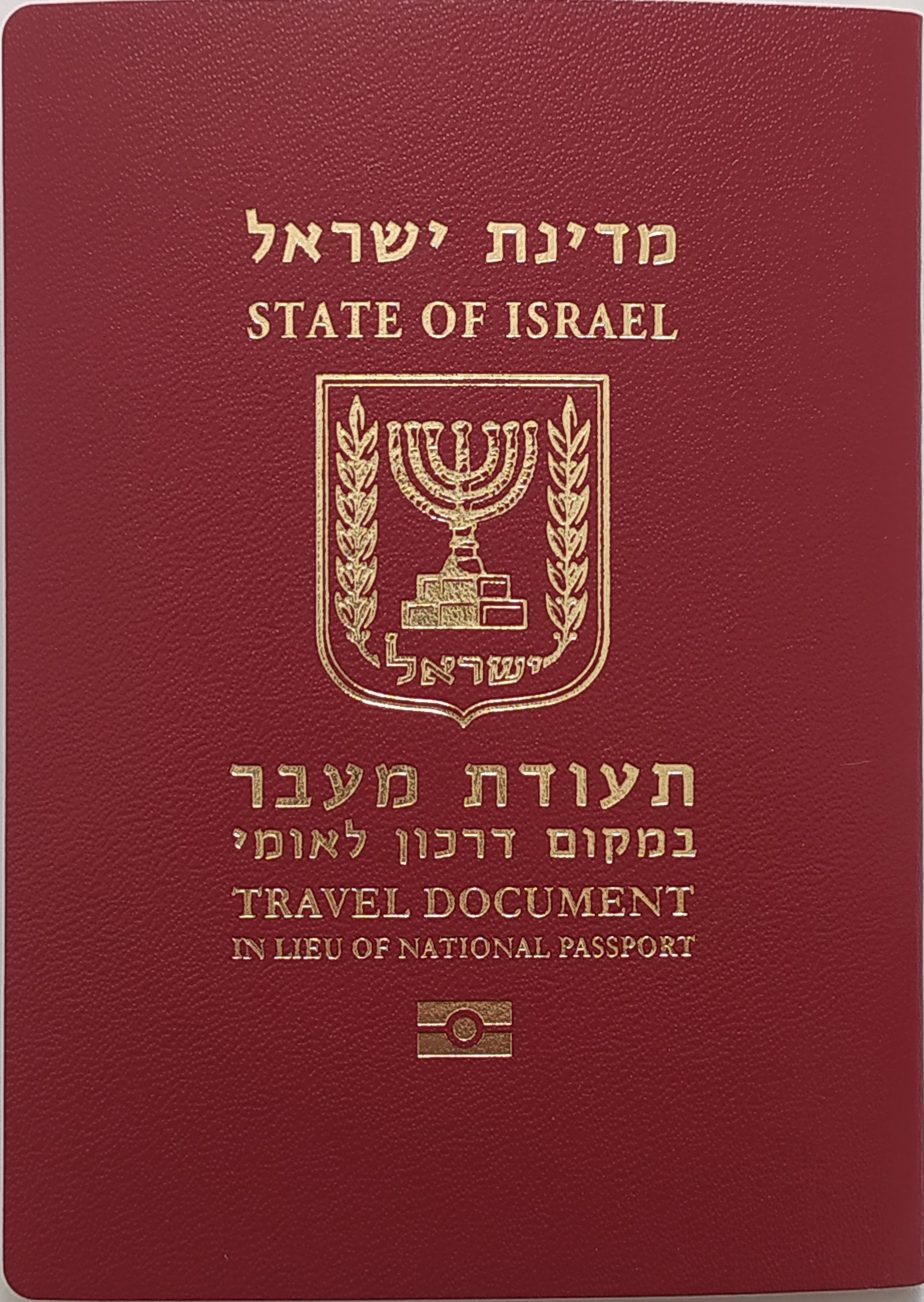
- The front cover of a contemporary Israeli biometric travel document in lieu of national passport
- Type: Travel document
- Issued by: Ministry of Interior of Israel
- Purpose: Identification
- Eligibility: Israeli citizenship
- Expiration: between 2 weeks and 5 years after issuance
- Cost: between 100 and 300 NIS

The Israeli travel document in lieu of national passport (Hebrew: תעודת מעבר במקום דרכון לאומי Teudat ma'avar bimkom darkon leumi), commonly called Israeli laissez-passer (e.g. at Cabinet of Israel's official website), is a travel document (provisional passport) issued to the citizens of the State of Israel who do not qualify for an ordinary Israeli passport e.g. if they became an Israeli citizen via the law of return but did not meet the residency requirements to obtain an ordinary Israeli passport.

It should not be confused with Israeli travel documents issued to non-citizens such as stateless residents of East Jerusalem and non-Israeli residents of the Golan Heights, as well as foreigners who need to leave Israel and are unable to obtain a passport from their country of nationality. Nationality is explicitly written on the information page of the document, identically to how it is recorded on an ordinary Israeli passport.

As of 27 August 2026, the travel document has visa-free access to all EU, EFTA and Schengen Area countries, as well as to Russia, Ukraine, Japan, Bosnia and Herzegovina, Montenegro, Serbia, Hong Kong, and Mexico.

== Eligibility ==
Most Israeli citizens travel on ordinary Israeli passports (Hebrew: דרכונים). Travel documents in lieu of a national passport are issued in specific circumstances, which include:

- Israeli citizens who acquired citizenship via the Law of Return but have not met the residency requirements to quality for an ordinary passport. By far the most common reason for the document to be issued.
- Israeli citizens who have lost or damaged more than two passports in the course of 10 years.
- Israeli citizens in emergency situation.

== Status ==
Although travel document in lieu of national passport is the official name of the document used in Israeli law and printed on its cover, the biodata page, machine-readable zone and data contained on the biometric chip of the document does not mention the term travel document. Instead, the name provisional passport is used in English. The document type printed on the information page, listed in the machine-readable zone and stored on the chip is PP which stands for provisional passport. Thus, when the document is scanned, type P vs PP is the only distinction between the document and an ordinary Israeli passport. As of early 2026, the travel document in lieu of national passport can be specifically selected in the IATA Timatic system which is used by airlines globally to check destination entry requirements. As a result, airlines no longer have issues dealing with the document.

== Types ==
Depending on the issuing authority and the specific circumstances of an Israeli citizen who is being issued a travel document in lieu of national passport, the period of validity may vary but is never more than 5 years. When the document is issued to an Israeli citizen who obtained citizenship other than via the Law of Return, is it typically being issued in an emergency situation and will be valid for a year or less. More commonly the document is issued to Israeli citizens who obtained their citizenship via the Law of Return and have not met the residency requirements to be eligible for an ordinary passport. To be eligible for an ordinary passport that is valid for 5 years, a citizen via the Law of Return must be physically present in Israel for 60% of the year preceding their application. To be eligible for an ordinary passport that is valid for 10 years, a citizen via the Law of Return must be physically present in Israel for 3 of the 5 years preceding their application. Thus if neither of these physical presence thresholds have been met, a travel document in lieu of national passport will be issued instead of an ordinary passport. Israel does not issue biometric travel documents or passports at diplomatic missions abroad so if the document is issued at a mission abroad it will be non-biometric. All travel documents and passports issued in Israel since 2017 are biometric.

== Visa requirements ==
Visa requirements for Israeli citizens holding a travel document in lieu of national passport. Israel Visa not required E-Visa required Visa required

Multiple countries such as all of those that form the Schengen Area grant holders of the Israeli travel document in lieu of national passport visa-free access under the same conditions as ordinary Israeli passport holders. Conversely, several other countries such as Canada and the United Kingdom explicitly state that Israeli travel document in lieu of national passport holders do require a visa, while ordinary Israeli passport holders do not.
