= Afghans in Germany =

German: Afghanen in Deutschland Dari: افغان‌ها در آلمان Pashto: په آلمان کې افغانان
- Afghan population in Germany (2022)

Total population
- 515,000 (2025) (Note: 515,000 persons with "migrant background in the wider sense" as of 2025, of which 403,000 persons have "migration experience of their own", and 449,780 Afghan citizens residing in Germany as of 31 December 2025, of which 46,365 were born in Germany.)

Regions with significant populations
- Hamburg: 63,539 (2025) (Note: 63,539 people with migration background from Afghanistan as of 31 December 2025, of which 32,121 were Afghan citizens.)
- Berlin: 24,979+ (2025) (Note: 24,979 residents with Afghan citizenship not counting German citizens with Afghan migration background as of 31 December 2025.)
- Frankfurt: Frankfurt proper; Offenbach; Wiesbaden; Darmstadt: 12,000+ (2021) (Note: "More than 12,000 people with Afghan migration background" as of 17 August 2021. In 2026, 8,665 Afghan citizens (excl. Germans citizens of Afghan ancestry) lived in Frankfurt.); 6,255+ (2026) (Note: 6,255 residents with Afghan citizenship not counting German citizens with Afghan migration background as of 30 June 2026.); 4,557 (2024) (Note: 4,557 residents of Afghan descent of which 2,598 held Afghan citizenship as of 31 December 2024.); 2,138+ (2025) (Note: 2,138 residents with Afghan citizenship not counting German citizens with Afghan migration background as of 31 December 2025.)
- Ruhr area: Essen; Dortmund: 19,475+ (2023) (Note: Extrapolation of all Afghan citizens of the 11 cities and 4 districts of the Regionalverband Ruhr not counting German citizens with Afghan migration background as of 2023.): 4,135+ (2023); 2,005+ (2023)
- Cologne/Bonn: Cologne: 14,780+ (2023) (Note: Extrapolation of all Afghan citizens of the 3 cities and 5 districts of the Cologne Bonn Region not counting German citizens with Afghan migration background as of 2023.): 8,844 (2025) (Note: 8,844 people with migration background from Afghanistan as of 31 December 2025, of which 5,408 were Afghan citizens only and 3,224 hold both German and Afghan citizenship.)
- Munich: 10,446+ (2025) (Note: 10,446 residents with Afghan citizenship not counting German citizens with Afghan migration background as of 31 December 2025.)
- Hannover: 9,250+ (2025) (Note: 9,250 residents with Afghan citizenship not counting German citizens with Afghan migration background as of 24 April 2025.)
- Bremen: 5,035+ (2022) (Note: 5,035 residents with Afghan citizenship not counting German citizens with Afghan migration background as of 31 December 2022.)
- Stuttgart: c. 5,000 (2021) (Note: c. 5,000 "Afghans in the Greater Region of Stuttgart" as of 17 August 2021.)

Languages
- Dari, Pashto, German

Religion
- Majority Islam (Sunni, Shia)

Afghans in Germany (Note: German: Afghanistanstämmige in Deutschland; Pashto: په آلمان کې افغانان, romanized: pə Ālmān ke Afǧānān; Dari: افغان‌ها در آلمان, romanized: Afǧānhā dar Ālmān) are German citizens with Afghan ancestry, and non-citizen residents born in—or with ancestors from—Afghanistan. In 2025 the Federal Statistical Office of Germany estimated the number of people of Afghan descent residing in Germany at 515,000, and the number of Afghan citizens at 449,780, making them the third-largest group from outside the EU and the second-largest group from Asia.

== History ==
Before 1979, the Afghan diaspora in Germany was small, with fewer than 2,000 Afghans residing in West Germany. This group consisted primarily of students and businessmen who arrived between the 1950s and 1970s. During this period, University exchange programs were established between the German school in Kabul and cities like Cologne, Bochum, and Bonn, which allowed the top graduates of to study in Germany. The trade city of Hamburg became a major hub commercially, particularly attracting traders of Afghan carpets.

=== First major migration wave of the 1980s and 1990s ===
The Soviet invasion of 1979 and the establishment of the Afghan communist government in Kabul triggered the first major influx of Afghans, with the population reaching about 11,000 by 1982. Among these early refugees were many supporters of the Islamist mujahideen, who were the fiercest opponents of the Soviet troops. A second period of immigration followed in the mid-1980s, driven by the persecution of communist sympathizers. During the 1980s, the diaspora was primarily composed of the country's urban, mostly western-oriented political elite and highly educated people from Kabul, Herat and Kandahar, including government officials, academics, physicians and educators who faced or feared repression from the communist regime.

The next major wave of refugees arrived following the withdrawal of Soviet troops in 1989 and the outbreak of the First Afghan Civil War. This conflict culminated in 1992 when the mujahideen overthrew the pro-Soviet government, forcing many former state officials, communist regime employees, and their associates to flee. Around the same time, immediately after the fall of the Berlin Wall, numerous Afghan scholarship students who had been studying at universities in former Eastern Bloc countries also moved to West Germany. This phase was followed by the Second Afghan Civil War between rival mujahideen factions. During the fierce fighting of the early 1990s, constant bombardments heavily targeted the capital city of Kabul, which forced a massive part of its population to flee. Most of the refugees who sought asylum in Germany during this period were well-educated Afghans escaping the collapsing political system. The situation escalated further with the takeover by the Taliban in 1996. Once the group established their regime, their repressive policies drove out the urban middle class that had previously managed to stay. Additionally, others fled to Germany due to economic reasons to support their families back home. As a result of these continuous conflicts, the Afghan population in Germany grew from around 20,000 in 1988 to 63,000 in 1996, and surpassed 70,000 in the early 2000s, making it one of the largest Afghan diaspora communities in the world at that time.

Following the U.S.-led invasion and the subsequent collapse of the Taliban regime in late 2001, the number of registered Afghan citizens in Germany began a steady decline, dropping below 50,000 by 2009. This demographic shift was driven by a significant number of refugees choosing to remigrate back to Afghanistan, while many who stayed acquired German citizenship.

=== Second major migration wave since the 2010s ===
By the late 2000s, the worsening security situation in Afghanistan, including Taliban attacks and U.S. drone strikes, stopped the return of refugees and pushed more people to leave the country again. The economic and social gap between Afghanistan and its neighbouring countries also played a role, as well as the fact that many Afghan refugees had already been living outside the country for over 20 years by that point. With little hope of building a stable life in Iran or Pakistan, and with limited chances of securing legal residence there, a growing number of Afghans decided to continue to Europe. In Germany, immigration from Afghanistan rose steadily from 2009 onward, and by 2014 was almost ten times higher than the previous low of 2007, while emigration stayed largely unchanged (see § Population).

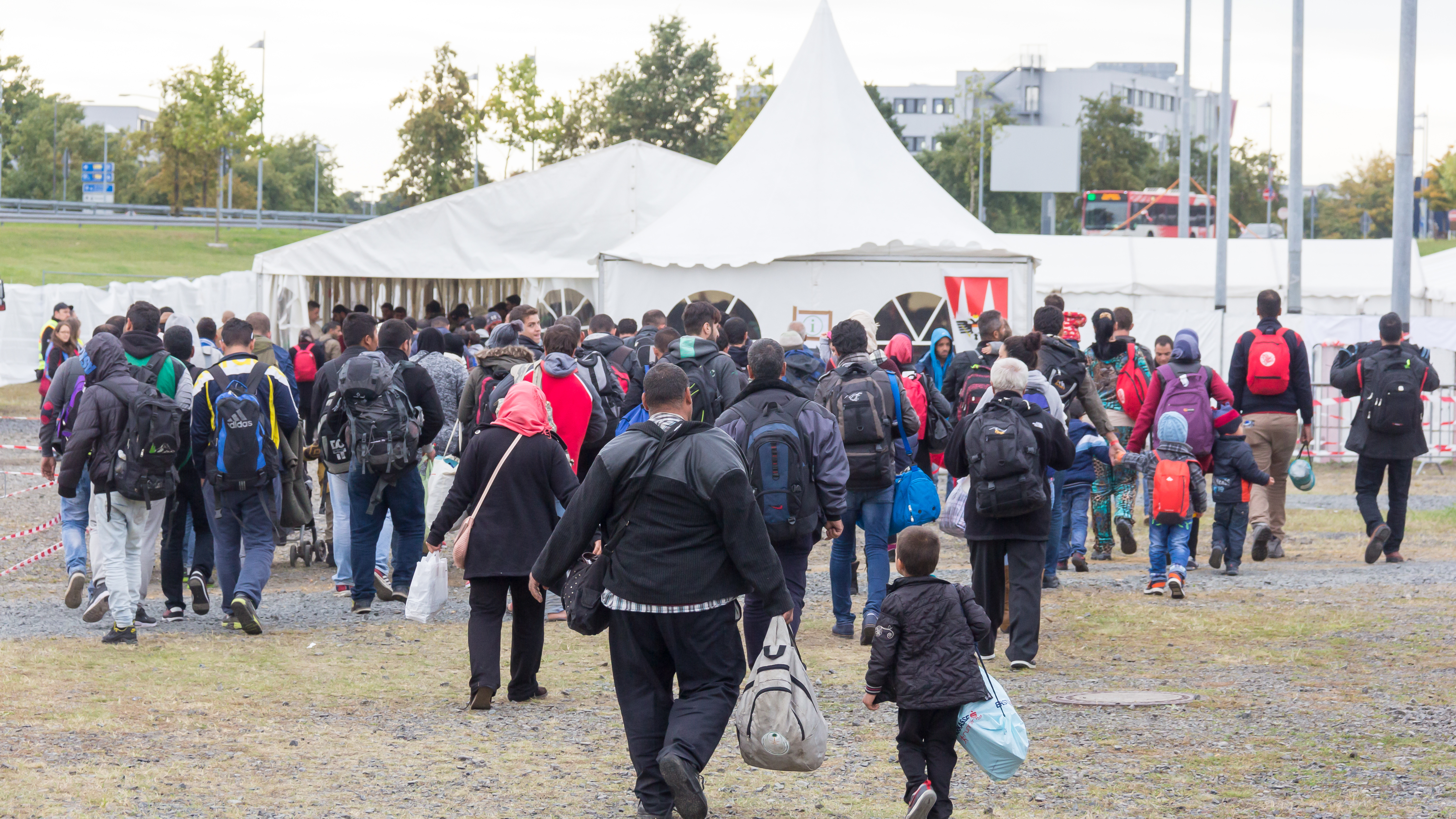
Refugees arriving in Germany (2015)

With the end of the ISAF combat mission in late 2014, conditions in Afghanistan deteriorated further. The disputed presidential election of 2014 had left the country in a political crisis, and declining international spending weakened the economy and contributed to rising unemployment, particularly among younger people. The security situation also worsened, with the United Nations recording its highest number of civilian casualties to that point in 2015. In Iran, the economic effects of international sanctions contributed to worsening conditions for Afghan residents, while some Afghan men were recruited, in some cases under pressure, to fight in the Syrian civil war. In Pakistan, the 2014 Peshawar school massacre was followed by increased pressure on Afghan refugees, including threats of mass deportation and reports of harassment, arrests and problems with residence documents. Because of these circumstances, migration to Europe increased sharply in 2015. The extended European migrant crisis provided an unusually accessible overland corridor to Central Europe via the Balkan route, and established smuggling (qachaqbar) networks facilitated movement along the route. Germany emerged as one of the principal destinations for Afghan asylum seekers, influenced by its reception policy during the refugee crisis, the established Afghan communities and the increasingly restrictive asylum and border policies adopted elsewhere in Europe. Economic prospects and access to education were additional considerations for some migrants. In 2015, almost 95,000 people Afghan citizens immigrated to Germany, followed by a further 70,000 in 2016 (see § Population). These migrants were predominantly young men, many of them with low levels of formal education, and the influx included a substantial number of unaccompanied minors. The movement declined sharply after March 2016 following the EU–Turkey statement and the closure of the route.

In late December 2016, Germany decided to repatriate 11,900 Afghans back to their home country, what is known as Second collective deportation.

Thousands of Afghans came to Germany following the withdrawal of German training forces in Afghanistan in 2021. They are mostly people who worked with the German army or German aid agencies in Afghanistan.

Two days after the 2025 German federal election an Air charter from Pakistan landed in Berlin, bringing 155 Afghans to Germany under various programs, initiated by the ousted Scholz cabinet. Five of the individuals had actually worked for the Bundeswehr in Afghanistan, the rest were family members and other people deemed to be in danger under the Taliban regime. The arrival was met with criticism and Alexander Throm of the election-winning party CDU suspected a plan by parting foreign minister Annalena Baerbock to bring as many Afghans as possible to Germany, before losing the power to do so. Another 3000 Afghans, who already had clearance to come to Germany, given by the parting government, were stuck in Pakistan as of early 2025. An attempt by the CDU to find out who the roughly 100 NGO´s were, who did choose the majority of the Afghans destined to come to Germany using the so called "Bundesaufnahmeprogramm für besonders gefährdete Menschen aus Afghanistan" was thwarted by the Scholz-administration by declaring the list of NGO´s Classified information. A third flight landed in Hannover on 27 March 2025 with another 200 Afghans, the former administration had deemed as vunerable.

The government suspended the distribution of new visa for Afghans in Pakistan after the new administration took over in May 2025. In June 2025 activists of the NGO "Kabul Luftbrücke" called the court Verwaltungsgericht Berlin to force the government to bring the remaining estimated 2400 Afghans, who already had an Federal Foreign Office acceptance letter, from Pakistan to Germany. A Berlin administrative court decided in July 2025, that an Afghan woman and 13 of her relatives, currently in Pakistan, have to be given Visa to come to Germany, after having been given invitations by the last administration in October 2023.

A group of 47 Afghans, who all had enforced access to Germany through legal proceedings, were taken from Islamabad to Hannover on 1 September 2025. 2 got lost during a stop in Istanbul, the other 45 arrived in Hannover. At the same time, 210 Afghans, who had been deported from Pakistan to Afghanistan despite having German acceptance letters, and were at the time housed with GiZ funding in Kabul, wrote an open letter to the German chancellor demanding immediate transport to Germany.

== Demographics ==
=== Population ===
As of 2025, according to the numbers from the Federal Statistical Office of Germany, approximately 450,000 Afghan citizens were registered in Germany. That year, net migration from Afghanistan amounted to roughly 19,000, while about 11,000 Afghan citizens were naturalized. Among refugees, around 273,000 held permanent or temporary recognized status, about 38,000 had open cases, and roughly 11,000 were obligated to leave the country. Counting naturalized citizens and their descendants alongside foreign nationals, the number of people with an Afghan migration background stood at approximately 515,000. Under the definitions of the Federal Statistical Office of Germany, Afghan citizens who choose to obtain German citizenship will have their "statistical" migration background gone, meaning second or third generation immigrants are not put under the definition.

Number of Afghan citizens in Germany per year, 1967–2025
Year	Central Register of Foreign Nationals (Note: This figure is based on the Central Register of Foreigners (AZR), which counts all individuals without German citizenship (excl. foreign armed forces and diplomats) but is subject to occasional data cleanups that can limit direct year-on-year comparability.)	Annual Net Change	Population Register Update (Note: This figure is based on municipal population registers, which record all registered German and non-German residents at their primary address by mathematically updating the most recent census data with ongoing births, deaths and migrations.)	Annual Net Change
1967	733	–	not recorded	
1968	773	40	not recorded	
1969	731	-42	not recorded	
1970	858	127	not recorded	
1971	1,095	237	not recorded	
1972	1,185	90	not recorded	
1973	1,424	239	not recorded	
1974	1,545	121	not recorded	
1975	1,652	107	not recorded	
1976	1,674	22	not recorded	
1977	1,765	91	not recorded	
1978	1,949	184	not recorded	
1979	2,338	389	not recorded	
1980	6,082	3,744	not recorded	
1981	9,594	3,512	not recorded	
1982	12,409	2,815	not recorded	
1983	11,897	-512	not recorded	
1984	12,050	153	not recorded	
1985	14,410	2,360	not recorded	
1986	17,192	2,782	not recorded	
1987	18,665	1,473	not recorded	
1988	17,427	-1,238	not recorded	
1989	22,461	5,034	not recorded	
1990	30,585	8,124	not recorded	
1991	36,409	5,824	not recorded	
1992	41,528	5,119	not recorded	
1993	46,464	4,936	not recorded	
1994	51,370	4,906	not recorded	
1995	58,505	7,135	not recorded	
1996	63,075	4,570	not recorded	
1997	66,385	3,310	not recorded	
1998	68,267	1,882	not recorded	
1999	71,955	3,688	not recorded	
2000	72,199	244	not recorded	
2001	71,662	-537	not recorded	
2002	69,016	-2,646	not recorded	
2003	65,830	-3,186	not recorded	
2004	57,933	-7,897	not recorded	
2005	55,111	-2,822	not recorded	
2006	52,162	-2,949	not recorded	
2007	49,808	-2,354	not recorded	
2008	48,437	-1,371	not recorded	
2009	48,752	315	not recorded	
2010	51,305	2,553	not recorded	
2011	56,563	5,258	50,199	–
2012	61,763	5,200	54,641	4,442
2013	66,974	5,211	59,456	4,815
2014	75,385	8,411	68,198	8,742
2015	131,454	56,069	146,687	78,489
2016	253,485	122,031	204,380	57,693
2017	251,640	-1,845	211,181	6,801
2018	257,110	5,470	217,685	6,504
2019	263,420	6,310	224,522	6,837
2020	271,805	8,385	233,114	8,592
2021	309,820	38,015	266,858	33,744
2022	377,240	67,420	330,834	63,976
2023	419,410	42,170	377,986	47,152
2024	442,020	22,610	404,269	26,283
2025	449,780	7,760	412,487	8,218

Number of naturalized Afghan citizens per year, 1993–2025
Year	Number of naturalized citizens
1993	≥662 (Note: 662 Afghan citizens were naturalized in North Rhine-Westphalia alone.)
1994	unknown
1995	7,515
1996	5,663
1997	4,735
1998	2,545
1999	3,768
2000	4,773
2001	5,111
2002	4,750
2003	4,948
2004	4,077
2005	3,131
2006	3,063
2007	2,831
2008	2,512
2009	3,549
2010	3,520
2011	2,711
2012	2,717
2013	3,054
2014	3,000
2015	2,572
2016	2,482
2017	2,400
2018	2,545
2019	2,675
2020	2,880
2021	3,175
2022	4,205
2023	6,520
2024	10,095
2025	10,883

Number of Afghan citizens by residence permit per year, 1998–2025 (Note: Male and female combined.)
Year
Year	Residence permit							
Year	Freedom of Movement Act/EU	exempt from the requirement	permanent settlement	temporary (Note: The Federal Statistical Office of Germany (Destatis) distinguishes between temporary residence permits for educational, employment, international law/humanitarian/political, family, and special and national visa reasons.)	application submitted	tolerated	during asylum procedure	without
1998	27	38	12,912	21,638	1	8,888	13,011	11,752
1999	38	38	13,826	21,638	5	10,939	9,585	10,806
2000	40	25	13,033	27,558	13	8,888	13,444	9,065
2001	47	35	14,403	28,180	22	7,304	13,513	8,158
2002	52	28	14,357	29,785	42	6,637	11,458	6,657
2003	56	26	14,087	29,634	408	6,833	8,576	6,210
2004	75	21	12,306	27,071	274	7,511	5,815	4,860
2005	106	19	13,314	26,325	1,342	6,791	3,283	3,931
2006	129	16	13,779	27,211	1,377	4,635	1,953	3,062
2007	157	13	14,443	27,429	1,589	2,753	965	2,459
2008	167	13	16,011	26,130	1,370	1,632	861	2,253
2009	188	14	16,254	24,833	1,104	969	2,913	2,477
2010	206	14	15,701	25,221	979	1,072	5,853	2,259
2011	213	13	15,167	25,435	1,718	1,373	9,976	2,668
2012	225	12	14,919	27,042	1,573	1,373	13,032	2,975
2013	189	12	14,312	30,050	1,988	2,743	14,350	3,330
2014	211	11	14,547	33,998	2,258	3,834	15,956	4,570
2015	233	11	14,925	36,920	3,169	9,040	35,549	31,607
2016	260	10	16,020	50,660	8,810	10,540	126,770	40,415
2017	305	10	15,795	105,535	12,530	10,445	85,290	21,725
2018	340	10	15,630	133,415	13,505	14,430	63,175	16,620
2019	375	10	15,960	148,240	16,085	20,820	47,340	14,590
2020	395	10	16,350	154,870	24,000	26,390	34,955	14,830
2021	390	10	19,235	173,075	25,550	25,750	42,795	23,020
2022	405	10	24,040	217,715	33,280	21,220	45,135	35,435
2023	415	15	30,235	261,325	36,845	12,480	52,035	26,070
2024	410	20	32,760	292,385	37,145	9,355	50,210	19,740
2025	395	15	33,900	278,915	68,120	10,295	36,130	22,015

Number of immigrants from and emigrants to Afghanistan per year, 2000–2025 (Note: These figures include both foreign and German citizens. The Federal Statistical Office of Germany (Destatis) categorizes the migration figures as migration "from Afghanistan" without clarifying whether individuals arrived directly or via long-term transit countries (e.g., Iran or Pakistan), where many lived for decades or were born. However, cross-referencing indicates the vast majority are Afghan citizens migrating either directly or indirectly to Germany, as the included fraction of German citizens never exceeded 317 individuals per year during this period.)
Year	Number of immigrants	Number of emigrants	Net migration
2000	6,123	2,102	4,021
2001	6,026	2,473	3,553
2002	3,565	1,995	1,570
2003	2,229	1,649	580
2004	1,980	1,708	272
2005	1,416	1,565	-149
2006	1,426	1,419	7
2007	1,354	1,126	228
2008	1,890	1,554	336
2009	4,616	1,707	2,909
2010	7,373	1,480	5,893
2011	9,291	1,509	7,782
2012	8,471	1,948	6,523
2013	8,951	1,944	7,007
2014	12,567	1,989	10,578
2015	94,902	4,971	89,931
2016	70,011	2,508	67,503
2017	8,277	1,258	7,019
2018	7,520	822	6,698
2019	7,581	775	6,806
2020	9,221	537	8,684
2021	31,906	471	31,435
2022	55,259	542	54,717
2023	48,631	547	48,084
2024	33,344	593	32,751
2025	19,872	617	19,255

Number of refugees with Afghan citizenship by protection status per year, 2007–2025 (Note: Male and female combined. The Federal Statistical Office of Germany uses the term Schutzsuchende ("protection seekers").)
Year
Year	Protection status						
Year	recognized			open	obligated to leave		
Year	permanently	temporarily		open	tolerated	latently	enforceably
Year	permanently	not from asylum procedures	from asylum procedures	open	tolerated	latently	enforceably
2007	6,290	4,690	10,350	965	2,450	510	500
2008	8,405	4,380	9,070	865	1,445	450	370
2009	9,310	4,625	8,395	2,915	810	475	310
2010	9,085	5,105	9,810	5,855	780	375	235
2011	8,935	4,530	11,260	9,975	1,060	420	255
2012	8,955	4,415	13,220	13,030	1,585	355	320
2013	8,735	4,370	16,525	14,350	2,315	415	350
2014	9,220	4,900	19,875	15,955	3,295	210	315
2015	9,700	5,815	21,360	35,550	4,330	255	295
2016	10,865	5,980	34,230	129,380	6,395	3,015	1,015
2017	10,810	6,160	87,970	83,600	9,120	4,095	2,420
2018	10,700	6,120	113,730	64,385	13,630	3,160	2,205
2019	10,925	6,515	126,440	47,645	20,060	2,635	2,200
2020	11,195	7,325	131,450	35,545	25,625	3,115	1,875
2021	13,230	11,610	142,515	44,375	24,850	2,195	905
2022	16,390	33,425	161,085	48,765	19,625	6,305	760
2023	20,630	39,805	191,560	56,680	9,765	3,540	590
2024	22,660	44,350	215,650	53,215	7,360	3,600	725
2025	23,545	37,025	211,945	37,820	7,440	2,065	1,460

Number of persons with a migration background from Afghanistan in a broader sense per year, 2020–2025 (Note: The Federal Statistical Office of Germany (Destatis) defines "persons with a migration background in a broader sense" as persons where "either themselves or at least one parent was born without German citizenship".)
Year	Number of persons	Annual Net Change
2020	309,000	–
2021	311,000	2,000
2022	389,000	78,000
2023	440,000	51,000
2024	475,000	35,000
2025	515,000	40,000

=== Age and gender ===
Historically most Afghans came to Germany as families. From 2012 there was a rising number of Afghan asylum seekers and a shifting trend to individual arrivals of Afghan men, rather than whole families. The migrants in the 2010s period were predominantly male, significantly shifting the gender balance. As of 2015, 44,778 (34.1%) of 25 to 35 year old Afghans in Germany were women. Among refugees who arrived after 2015, about two-thirds were under the age of 30. The male-female ratio is somewhat balanced for adults over 35 and children under 15, but in those between 15 and 35 there is a huge male surplus.

=== Distribution ===
Distribution of Afghan citizens in districts of Germany in 2021

The Afghan population in Germany has historically been concentrated in urban areas and major metropolitan areas. In 2004, nearly two-thirds of Afghans lived in just the three federal states of Hamburg, Hesse, and North Rhine-Westphalia, with established communities particularly concentrated in major cities. This concentration was largely driven by extended family reunification and the fact that these established communities offered better networks for finding employment. By the 2011 German census, the Afghan population was concentrated primarily in major metropolitan regions. Established communities with the largest shares of Afghan migrants were found in the metropolitan regions of Hamburg, (Note: incl. Hamburg proper and Stormarn) Frankfurt, (Note: incl. Frankfurt am Main, Offenbach am Main, Darmstadt, Offenbach district, Hochtaunuskreis, Main-Taunus-Kreis, Main-Kinzig-Kreis and Mainz) Rhine-Ruhr, (Note: incl. Essen, Mönchengladbach and Bonn) Munich, Hanover, Kassel and Freiburg.

Since the second major migration wave in 2015/16, Berlin and regions across Eastern Germany have become increasingly important for the community.

==== Hamburg ====
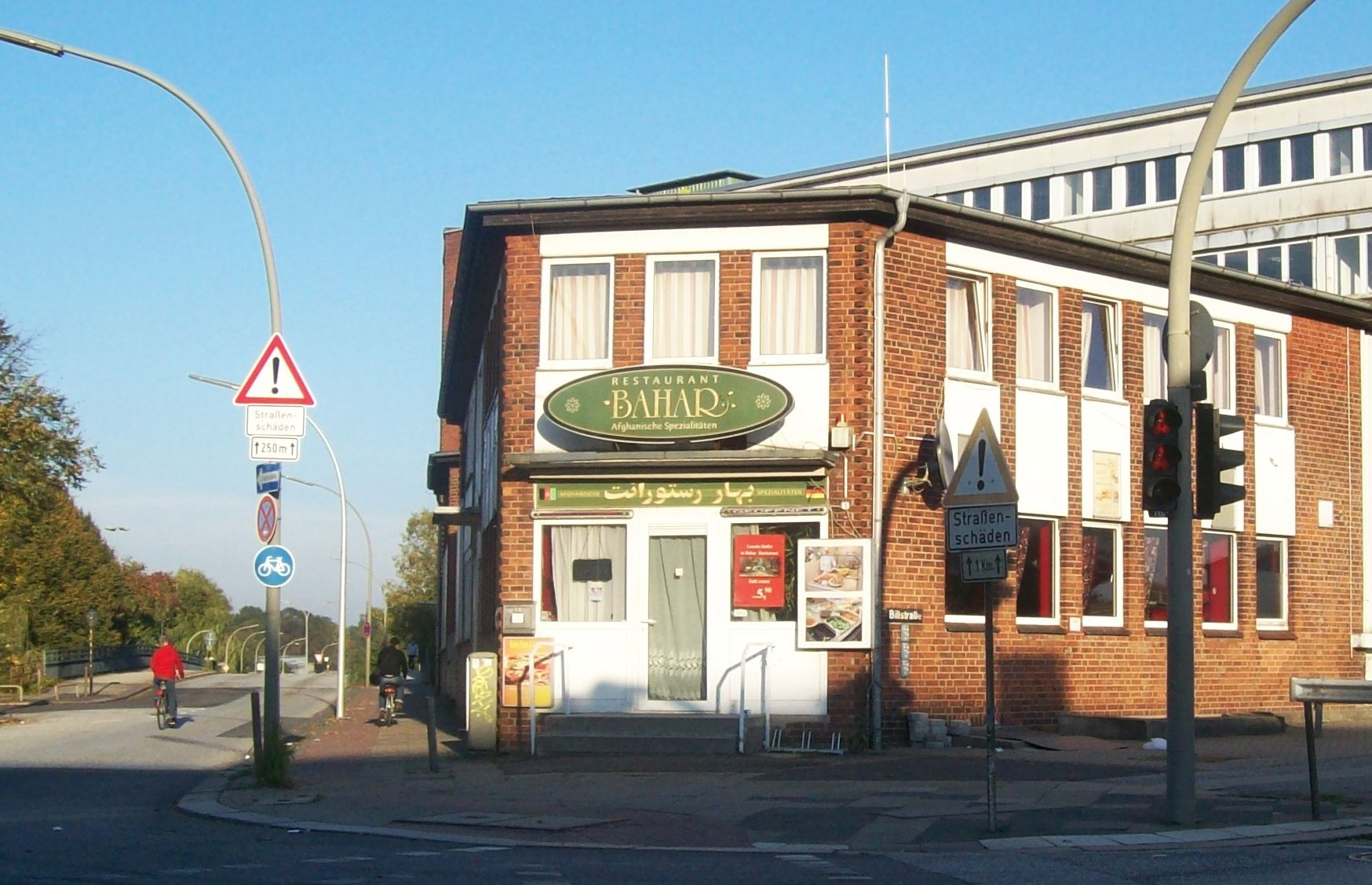
An Afghan restaurant in Hamburg

In particular, there are over 50,000 Afghans in Hamburg alone, comprising about 2,7% of the city's population (as of 2023). In 2008, around 22,000 residents of Afghan origin lived in Hamburg alone. This made the city home to the largest Afghan diaspora community in Germany as well as in all of Europe. Immigration began with the start of the Soviet–Afghan War in 1979 and additional immigration came after its end. Due to the differing origins and political affiliations of the émigrés, Jochen-Martin Dutsch et al. wrote in Der Spiegel that "Hamburg's Afghan community was relatively loose-knit and was rarely perceived as an ethnic group, partly because these immigrants had been so deeply divided at home that there was little left to unite them as a community abroad." Therefore, the residents focused internally on their own families and keeping them together. The large Afghan community in Hamburg make the city feel like home to many German Afghans, despite the low-lying port city contrasting to the mountainous and landlocked Afghanistan.

Number of Afghan citizens in the states of Germany in 2015 (does not include German citizens of Afghan descent)
State	Population
Baden-Württemberg	9,995
Bavaria	21,891
Berlin	8,138
Brandenburg	2,868
Bremen	1,018
Hamburg	14,468
Hesse	19,171
Mecklenburg-Western Pomerania	2,232
Lower Saxony	9,085
North Rhine-Westphalia	18,954
Rhineland Palatinate	5,126
Saarland	1,147
Saxony	6,123
Saxony Anhalt	2,242
Schleswig-Holstein	5,967
Thuringia	3,029

Number of Afghans in larger cities
#	City	People
1.	Hamburg	51,006
2.	Berlin	13,301
3.	Munich	7,446
4.	Frankfurt	5,114
5.	Cologne	4,313
6.	Bremen	4,215
7.	Essen	2,504
8.	Leipzig	2,171
9.	Bonn	2,078
10.	Stuttgart	2,046

== Society ==
[The Afghan diaspora in Germany is] a very heterogeneous group, as Afghanistan is a very heterogeneous country, a truly multi-ethnic country. And Afghan refugees didn’t all come to Germany at once. They came in waves.”

— Dr Yahya Wardak, head of a German Afghan organization

=== Socioeconomic background, education and employment ===
The Afghan population in Germany has included people from different educational and socioeconomic backgrounds. The small Afghan community before the 1980s consisted mainly of students and businesspeople, including merchants involved in the carpet trade.

The migrants who arrived during the 1980s were often highly educated and included members of Afghanistan's professional and administrative urban elite. Many had university degrees or had worked as government officials, academics, doctors or teachers, and some had held senior positions in Afghanistan. Their qualifications and professional experience, however, often did not lead to comparable employment in Germany. Many worked in occupations well below their previous professional status, including taxi driving, as foreign qualifications and professional experience were difficult to transfer to the German labour market.

During the 1990s, the educational and occupational backgrounds of Afghan migrants became more diverse. The population included members of the educated and professional classes as well as less wealthy and less formally educated Afghans from other social backgrounds.

The refugees who arrived during the European migrant crisis of the mid-2010s came from both urban and rural areas and had widely differing levels of education and professional qualifications. Surveys conducted during this time found substantial shares with little or no formal schooling alongside others with secondary or higher education. Their previous occupations also varied considerably. Among those who had previously lived in Iran, construction and other forms of manual labour were common occupations before migration to Germany. The employment situation of this group improved gradually after arrival, with the employment rate of Afghan nationals reaching around 40% by 2020.

Afghans who arrived since 2021 tended to have higher levels of formal education and more favourable educational and language profiles than those who arrived the years prior. Recent arrivals were also described as bringing previous professional experience. Among those admitted were former locally hired staff (Ortskräfte) and people who had worked in the judiciary, education, academia, civil society and the media.

=== Language ===
A volunteer assisting refugees at Cologne Bonn Airport wears a vest displaying Dari, Pashto, Persian, Farsi, English and Urdu, showing the most common languages among the Afghan refugees (2015)

Dari (Note: The term "Dari" is used here as an umbrella term for the varieties of Persian originating in Afghanistan, including regional dialects such as Kabuli, Herati and Hazaragi. In Afghanistan, the language is also commonly referred to as Farsi, while Afghan Persian is another common designation in linguistic literature.) and Pashto are the main languages spoken by Afghans in Germany. According to surveys of Afghan migrant populations from the mid-2010s, Dari has accounted for more than 75% of reported mother tongues, while Pashto has generally accounted for around 20% or less. This pattern was already reflected in the earlier community, which was shaped in the 1980s and 1990s by migration from predominantly Dari-speaking urban centres such as Kabul and Herat.

Although it is not the name of a distinct language, in German-language contexts, the term Afghanisch ("Afghan") is often used as an informal designation for Dari, including in educational and language-mediation contexts. The term is not used consistently, however, and has also been used to refer to Pashto.

The community also includes many people, particularly from the second migration wave, whose language was shaped by migration through Iran or Pakistan, where they acquired linguistic influences from their countries of residence. Those raised in Iran commonly used Iranian Persian alongside Dari, with some retaining an Iranian Persian accent when speaking Dari. Although Dari and Iranian Persian are closely related and generally mutually intelligible, differences in pronunciation and usage can sometimes make communication difficult, particularly in formal settings.

Afghans raised in Germany often become more fluent in German than in their heritage language, particularly among younger generations. In households where both languages are used, German tends to dominate between siblings, while Dari or Pashto remains the language used with parents and older relatives. Among more recent arrivals, heritage languages remain dominant in daily life. German proficiency generally improves with length of residence, but many continue to face difficulties learning the language. A survey found that German was used in only 4% of everyday communication among this group, while Pashto and Dari remained dominant at 51% and 46% respectively.

=== Ethnicity ===
Reliable statistics on the ethnic composition of the Afghan population in Germany as a whole are not available. This is particularly true of the earlier migration waves of the 1980s and 1990s. Research based on a 1989 study by the Saarland University concluded that Pashtuns constituted the largest ethnic group among Afghan refugees in Germany at the time. Studies of the Afghan diaspora from the 2000s likewise identified Pashtuns and Tajiks as the largest ethnicities. A contemporary estimate for the city of Hamburg put the shares of Pashtuns and Tajiks at around 40% each, with the remaining 20% comprising Hazaras, Uzbeks and smaller groups.

The ethnic background of more recent Afghan asylum applicants is better documented. According to the Federal Office for Migration and Refugees, in the early 2010s, Tajiks accounted for approximately 43–56% of applicants, followed by Hazaras at 12–21% and Pashtuns at 12–20%, with around 9–11% recorded as having unknown ethnicity and 6–8% classified as other groups. During the European refugee crisis of the mid-2010s, the share of Tajiks fell to approximately 36–44%, while that of Hazaras rose to 22–26%. Pashtuns as the third-largest group accounted for around 14–17% of applicants. Around 11–20% were recorded as having unknown ethnicity, while other groups accounted for approximately 5–6%.

Since 2021, Hazaras are thought to have constituted a particularly large share of Afghans seeking asylum in Germany. This is consistent with a small 2025 study of 49 Afghan refugees, of whom approximately 59% identified as Hazara, 25% as Tajik, 12% as Pashtun and 2% as Uzbek, although the sample is too small to reflect the wider Afghan refugee population at the time.

=== Religion ===
Religion is an important part of Afghan community life in Germany. The population that arrived during the major migration waves of the 1980s and 1990s was overwhelmingly Muslim and predominantly Sunni, with smaller Shia communities. Smaller Hindu, Sikh and other religious minorities were also present. Several Afghan religious and cultural associations were established, most of them Islamic, alongside a small number of Hindu and Sikh associations.

The religious composition of Afghan asylum seekers arriving from the mid-2010s differed in some respects from that of the population in Afghanistan. Muslims remained the majority, but surveys found varying proportions of Sunni and Shia Muslims and people belonging to other or no religions. Estimates of the Muslim share ranged from below 70% to above 90%, with more than 40% identifying as Sunni and more than 25% as Shia in some surveys. Conversion to Christianity became a more visible issue among this cohort. Some converted after arriving and cited their new faith in asylum proceedings. Reports from the period documented missionary activities and rapid baptisms, as well as concerns that some conversions were motivated by the prospect of avoiding deportation. There were also reports of applicants who allegedly feigned conversion receiving positive asylum decisions. German asylum authorities and courts examined the credibility of individual conversions and the circumstances in which they had taken place.

=== Social and political life ===
The political history of Afghanistan has also deeply shaped local associations in Germany. Student clubs from the 1960s and 1970s were mostly left-leaning and later turned into aid organizations. In the 1980s, new associations emerged along the lines of the war, representing mujahideen, royalists, or Maoists. When the communist government collapsed in the early 1990s, arriving refugees set up their own clubs. As a result, the organizational landscape directly mirrored the political fault lines of the Afghan conflict. Recently, however, second-generation Afghans have started new networks focused on connecting young people in Germany and maintaining an exchange with youth in Afghanistan.

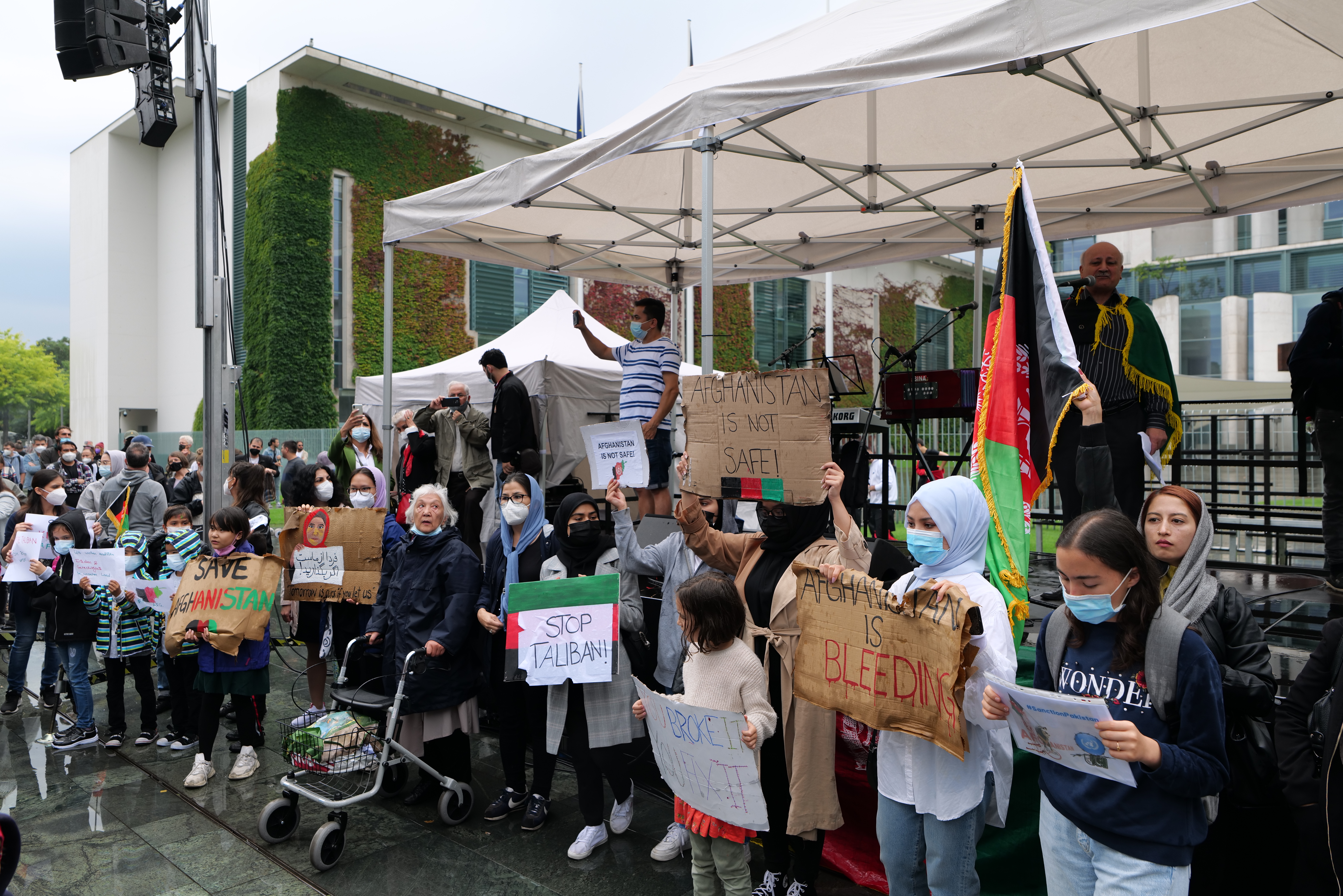
Afghans in Berlin demonstrating for solidarity with the people of Afghanistan after the 2021 Fall of Kabul

Some Afghans in Germany feel their representation in society is limited, despite it being one of the country's largest immigrant groups.

Associations include the Afghan-German Association for Education, Health and Crafts founded in 2002, the Afghanistan Information Center founded in 1993, and the Afghan Women's Association founded in 1992. About 130 association with clear connections to Afghanistan have been identified in Germany as of 2017. These comprise groups mainly related to politics and integration, education and social affairs, culture, religion and health.

From 1998 to 2011 the privately owned Afghan Museum operated in Hamburg's Speicherstadt district.

In 2016 there were 157 underage individuals of Afghan origin in child marriages according to the interior ministry.

=== Social integration ===
Contemporary assessments in the late 2000s described the Afghan community in Germany as divided into different social categories. These ranged from individuals who were fully assimilated into German society to a majority maintaining a dual identity and a smaller group practising a traditional and religious micro-culture. This internal diversity was regarded as a major reason why the community lacked a unified political voice at the time.

== Culture ==
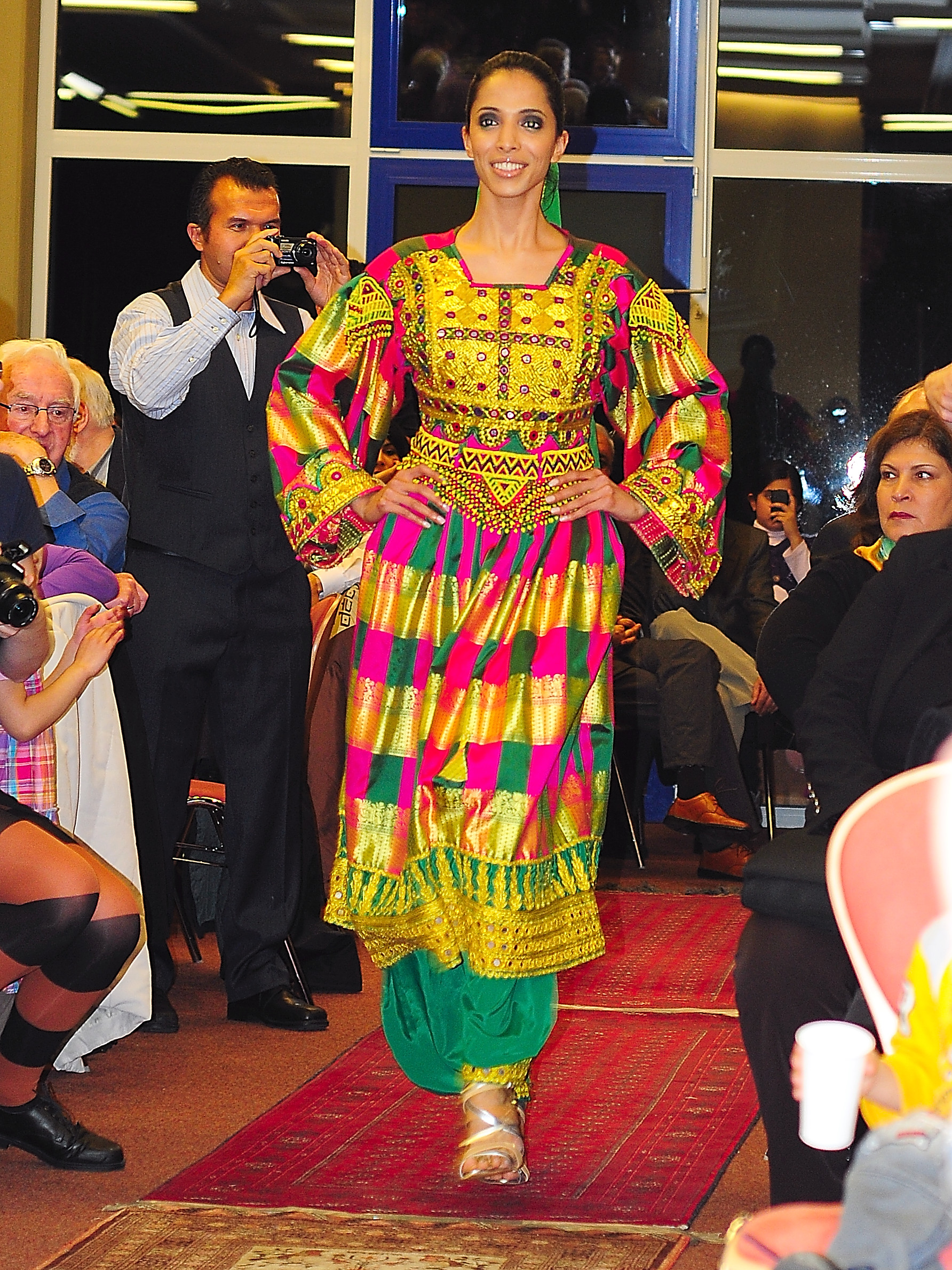
German Afghan model Zohre Esmaeli in traditional Afghan clothing during a charity event (2011)

Afghans in Germany maintain a range of cultural practices relating to family life, hospitality, food, celebrations, music and community life. These practices are maintained within families and social networks and are also expressed through community events and cultural organisations. They have also been influenced by life in Germany and by cultural exchanges within the wider Afghan diaspora.

=== Customs and celebrations ===
Hospitality, known as mehman nawazi, is an important custom among Afghans. Guests are typically welcomed with tea and food, and special dishes are often prepared for visitors and family gatherings. Common foods and drinks including qabeli palaw, black tea and qaimaq chai are particularly associated with weddings, engagements and birthdays. Among Afghans in Germany, hospitality is also expressed through regular visits between families and friends. An ethnographic study of Afghan women in Berlin describes a practice of hosting in which women take turns visiting one another, sharing food and maintaining social networks through hospitality and mutual support.

Family and community celebrations include engagements, weddings, henna nights, baby showers, birthdays, anniversaries and seasonal celebrations such as Nowruz and Shab-e Yalda. Afghan families often prepare traditional food for such occasions, and celebrations provide opportunities for relatives and friends to meet and maintain social ties. Traditional clothing, textiles, music and dance may also form part of these celebrations. Weddings are one of the most important family celebrations among Afghans in Germany and adjacent countries. They often involve an engagement ceremony, a henna night (takhte khina) and the wedding itself, with both families taking part. Traditional elements described among Afghans in Germany include the performance of Ahesta Bero and Attan, singing and dancing, the use of the dairah drum and the application of henna to the bride's and groom's hands. Afghan weddings in Germany may also combine these traditions with German or other international influences and with both Islamic and civil marriage ceremonies. Marriage also remains an important way of maintaining family and community ties among Afghans in the diaspora. Recent research indicates that Afghan refugees in Germany continue to show relatively high levels of marriage within their own nationality group.

Widely observed religious occasions include Eid (German: Zuckerfest) and Eid-e Qurban (German: Opferfest). Among Shia Afghans, Ashura and other observances during Muharram are also marked. Afghan communities in Germany hold religious gatherings in mosques, particularly during Ramadan and other important periods of the religious calendar. During Ramadan, families also gather for iftar, and food may be prepared and distributed as nazri during religious occasions. Religious practice also includes participation in religious events and regular prayer, although the extent of participation varies between individuals.

=== Music, arts and community events ===
Afghan music and arts are practiced in Germany at community gatherings and public cultural events and are seen as an important part of cultural life and identity. Music performed by Afghan artists includes traditional and regional forms as well as contemporary popular music. Afghan musicians from Germany and other parts of the Afghan diaspora regularly give concerts in Germany, alongside cultural festivals and community events featuring music, dance and other performances. Other cultural activities include literary and poetry readings, theatre performances, exhibitions, workshops and cultural evenings. Afghan community organisations and cultural institutions also organise activities relating to music, literature, language and cultural traditions. Some cultural events are organised specifically for women and combine social gatherings with music, dance and other forms of cultural expression.

== Notable people ==
Music

- Western Popular music
  - Kalim (rapper), rapper
  - SadiQ, rapper
  - Graziella Schazad, singer-songwriter
  - SSIO, rapper
  - Simin Tander, jazz musician
  - Nina Tenge, rapper
- Afghan music
  - Hamayoun Angar, singer
  - Aria Band, music group
  - Mehdi Farukh, singer
  - Fayaz Hamid, singer
  - Afsana Nawabi, singer
  - Akbar Nikzad, singer
  - Seeta Qasemi, singer-songwriter
  - Farid Rastagar, singer
  - Wajiha Rastagar, singer
  - Sediq Shabab, singer
  - Tahir Shabab, singer
  - Farhad Shams, singer
  - Jawid Sharif, singer
  - Delagha Surood, singer
  - Valy (singer), singer

Science

- Abdul Ahad Momand, cosmonaut

Film, television and media

- ApoRed, YouTuber
- Khesrau Behroz, podcaster
- Ali Hakim, film director
- Faisal Kawusi, comedian
- Burhan Qurbani, film director
- Mina Tander, actress

Literature and philosophy

- Ahmad Milad Karimi, philosopher
- Sulaiman Masomi, poetry-slammer
- Kabir Stori, poet

Sports

- Nadiem Amiri, footballer
- Mansur Faqiryar, footballer
- Nasrat Haqparast, mixed martial artist
- Shokran Parwani, boxer
- Hamid Rahimi, boxer

Politics

- Rangin Dadfar Spanta, former minister
- Schahina Gambir, member of the Bundestag
- Sulaiman Layeq, former minister and poet
- Sayed Sadaat, former minister

Fashion

- Zohre Esmaeli, model
- Rebecca Mir, model
- Zallascht Sadat, model

== See also ==
- Immigration and crime in Germany
  - 2016 Würzburg train attack
  - 2024 Mannheim stabbing
  - 2025 Aschaffenburg stabbing attack
  - 2025 Munich car attack
- Afghanistan–Germany relations
- Afghans in the Netherlands
- Afghans in the United Kingdom
- Afghans in Sweden
- Afghan Americans
- Afghan Canadians
- Afghan Australians
- Afghan New Zealanders
