= Rastagar =

Rastagar is a surname. Notable people with the surname include:

- Farid Rastagar (born 1963), Afghan singer
- Wajiha Rastagar (born 1967), Afghan singer
