= Abdul Aziz Wahabzadah =

Afghan-born New Zealander who confronted a terrorist in 2019

Abdul Aziz Wahabzadah NZC
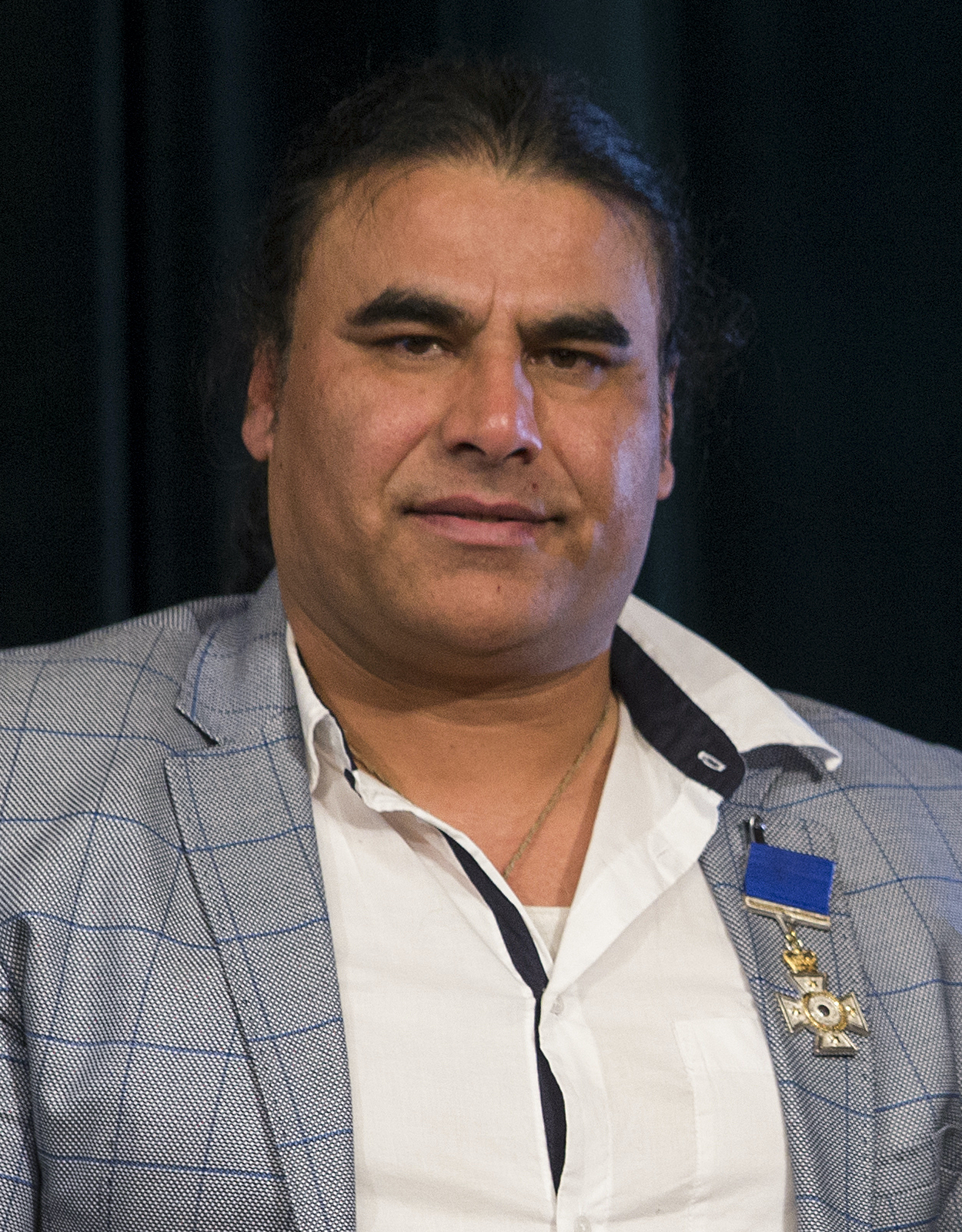
- Abdul Aziz after receiving the New Zealand Cross, 2022
- Born: 1973 or 1974 (age 52–53); Kabul, Afghanistan
- Occupation: Furniture store owner
- Known for: Confronting the perpetrator of the Christchurch mosque shootings
- Children: 4
- Awards: New Zealand Cross (2021)

Abdul Aziz Wahabzadah NZC (born 1973 or 1974) is an Afghan-born New Zealander who was awarded the New Zealand Cross for his actions during the Christchurch mosque shootings on 15 March 2019. He confronted the terrorist Brenton Tarrant outside the Linwood Islamic Centre, chasing him away and potentially saving lives.

== Early life and family ==
Abdul Aziz Wahabzadah was born in 1973 or 1974 in Kabul, Afghanistan. He left the country with his parents as a refugee when he was a child, and subsequently lived in Australia for 27 years. In March 2019 he and his family had lived in Christchurch for two years, where he owned a second-hand furniture store. He has four sons.

== Actions during the attack ==
On 15 March 2019, Aziz was inside the Linwood Islamic Centre with about 80 other worshippers, including his children, when he heard gunshots. Initially thinking it was fireworks, he realised it was an attack when he saw a man in tactical gear carrying one of his weapons.

Without a weapon, Aziz grabbed a handheld credit card machine and ran outside, shouting "Come here!" to distract the terrorist, eventually throwing the machine at him. The gunman, Brenton Tarrant, turned and fired at him after retrieving a Ruger AR-556 rifle and a Mossberg Predator Bolt action rifle. Aziz took cover behind cars as bullets flew past. Regardless of Abdul's presence, Tarrant didn't bother and went into the mosque to continue his attack.

After Tarrant left the mosque, Aziz picked up an empty Remington Model 870 shotgun, that was discarded earlier and intimidated him. The attacker took out a Bayonet knife, but ultimately decided to retreat to his car. Aziz chased him, threw the shotgun at his car's rear window and damaged it as Tarrant sped away.

== Aftermath and recognition ==
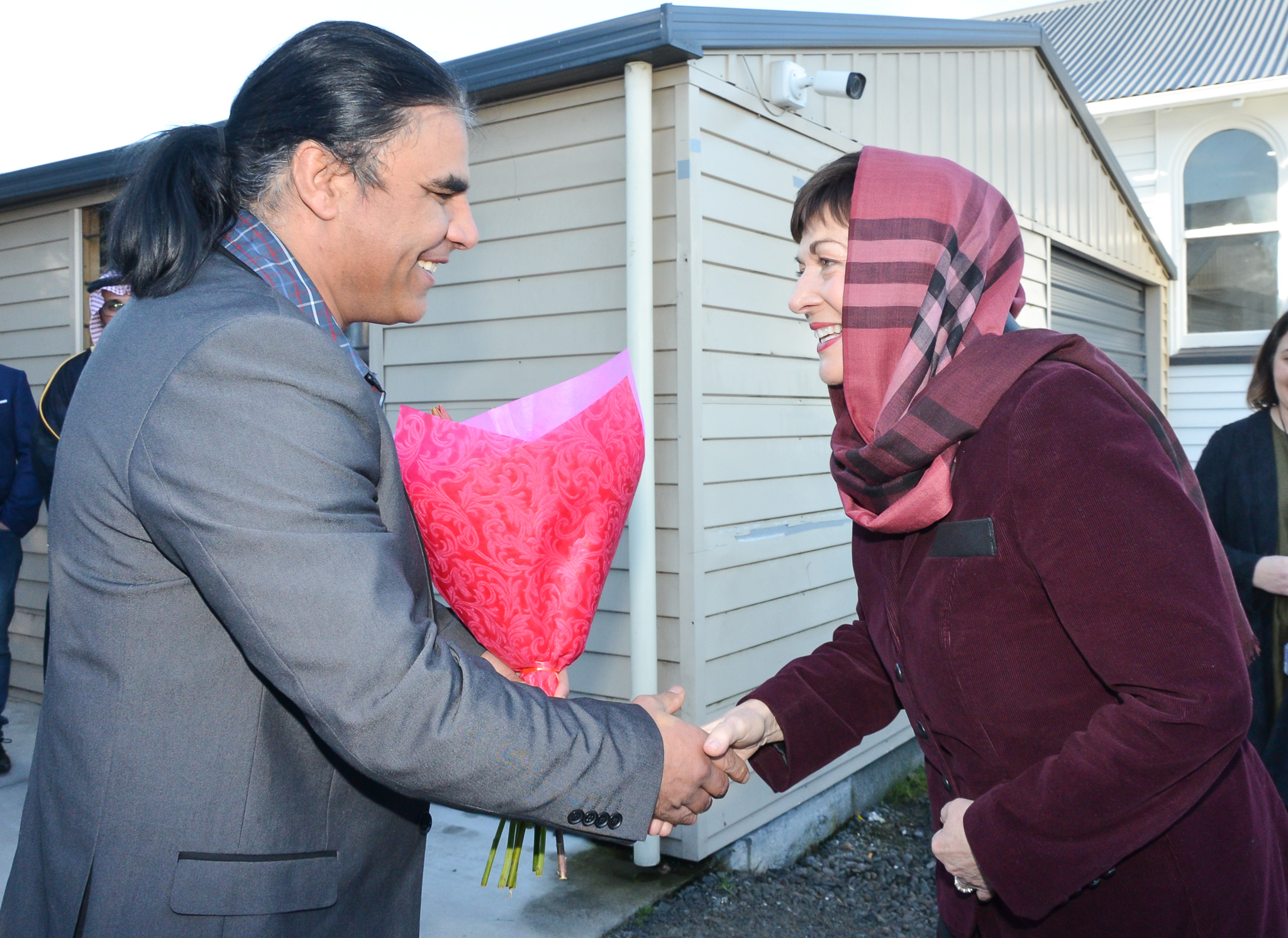
Aziz meeting the governor-general, Dame Patsy Reddy, during a vice-regal visit to the Linwood Islamic Centre on 29 June 2019

Tarrant was arrested by police shortly after the attack; Aziz was hailed as a hero for his bravery.

During Tarrant's sentencing in August 2020, Aziz confronted him directly in court. He told the terrorist that he should thank God (Allah) that Aziz did not catch him, and concluded: "Never forget these two eyes you ran from".

In the 2021 New Zealand bravery awards, Aziz was awarded the New Zealand Cross, the country's highest civilian honour for bravery. His investiture by the governor-general, Cindy Kiro, took place at a ceremony at Christchurch Town Hall on 5 July 2022.

The last paragraph of the citation for the NZ Cross read:

The situation in which Mr Aziz found himself was extremely dangerous. In challenging the gunman he displayed great courage and bravery, and complete disregard for his own safety. Mr Aziz’s brave actions deterred the gunman from re-entering this Mosque to kill and maim others and ultimately forced the gunman to flee the Mosque.

In 2023, Aziz was part of the official New Zealand delegation that attended the coronation of King Charles in London.
