= 2021 New Zealand bravery awards =

The 2021 New Zealand bravery awards were announced via a Special Honours List on 16 December 2021. The awards recognised the bravery of 10 people in connection with the Christchurch mosque shootings on 15 March 2019.

== New Zealand Cross (NZC) ==
The New Zealand Cross was awarded for acts of great bravery in a situation of extreme danger:

- Naeem Rashid – of Christchurch. (Note: Posthumous award. Deceased 15 March 2019.)
- Abdul Aziz Wahabzadah
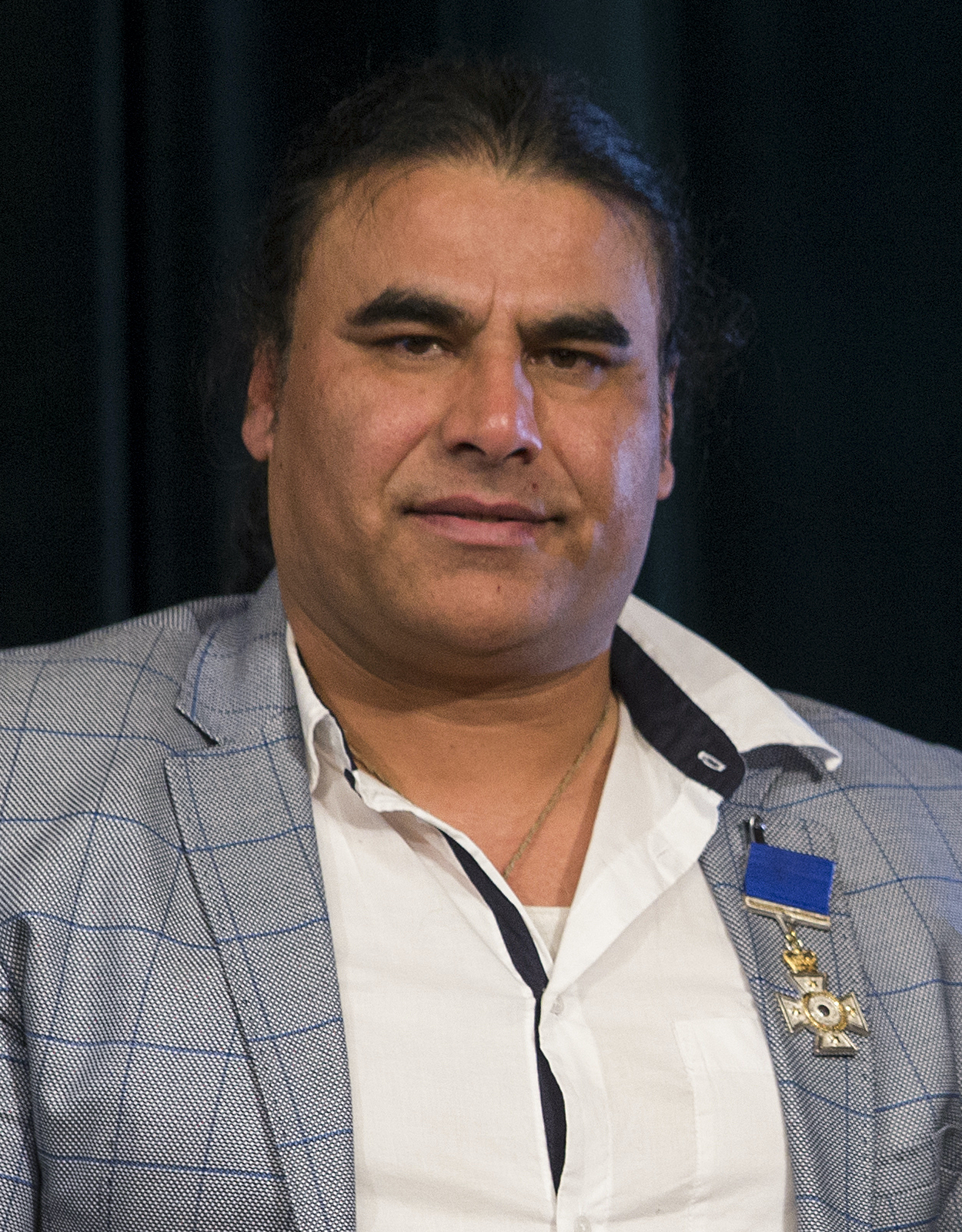
Abdul Aziz

== New Zealand Bravery Decoration (NZBD) ==
The New Zealand Bravery Decoration was awarded for an act of exceptional bravery in a situation of danger:

- Liam Christiaan Armand Beale
- Senior Constable Scott Eric Carmody
- Senior Constable James Andrew Manning
- Ziyaad Shah
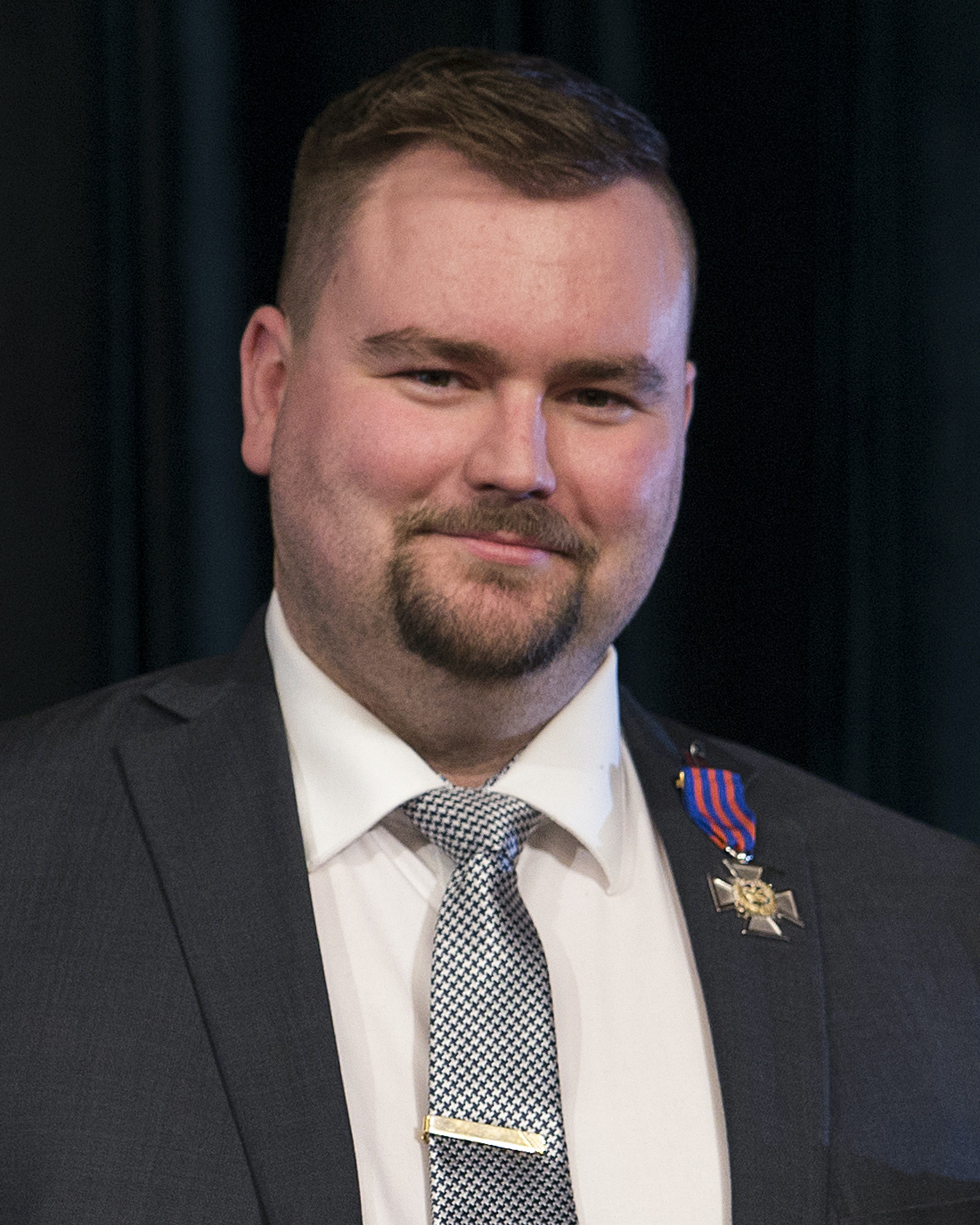
Liam Beale

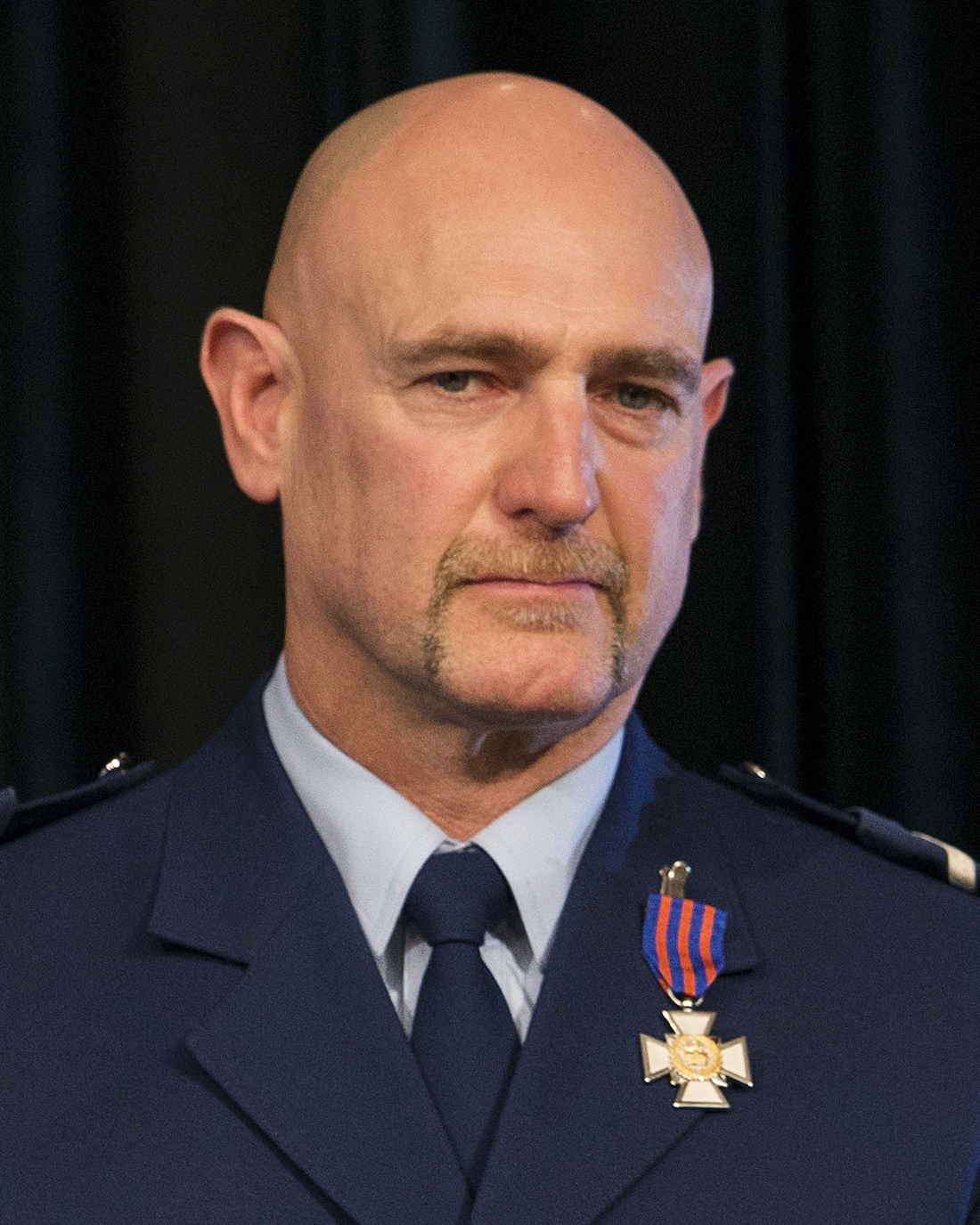
Scott Carmody

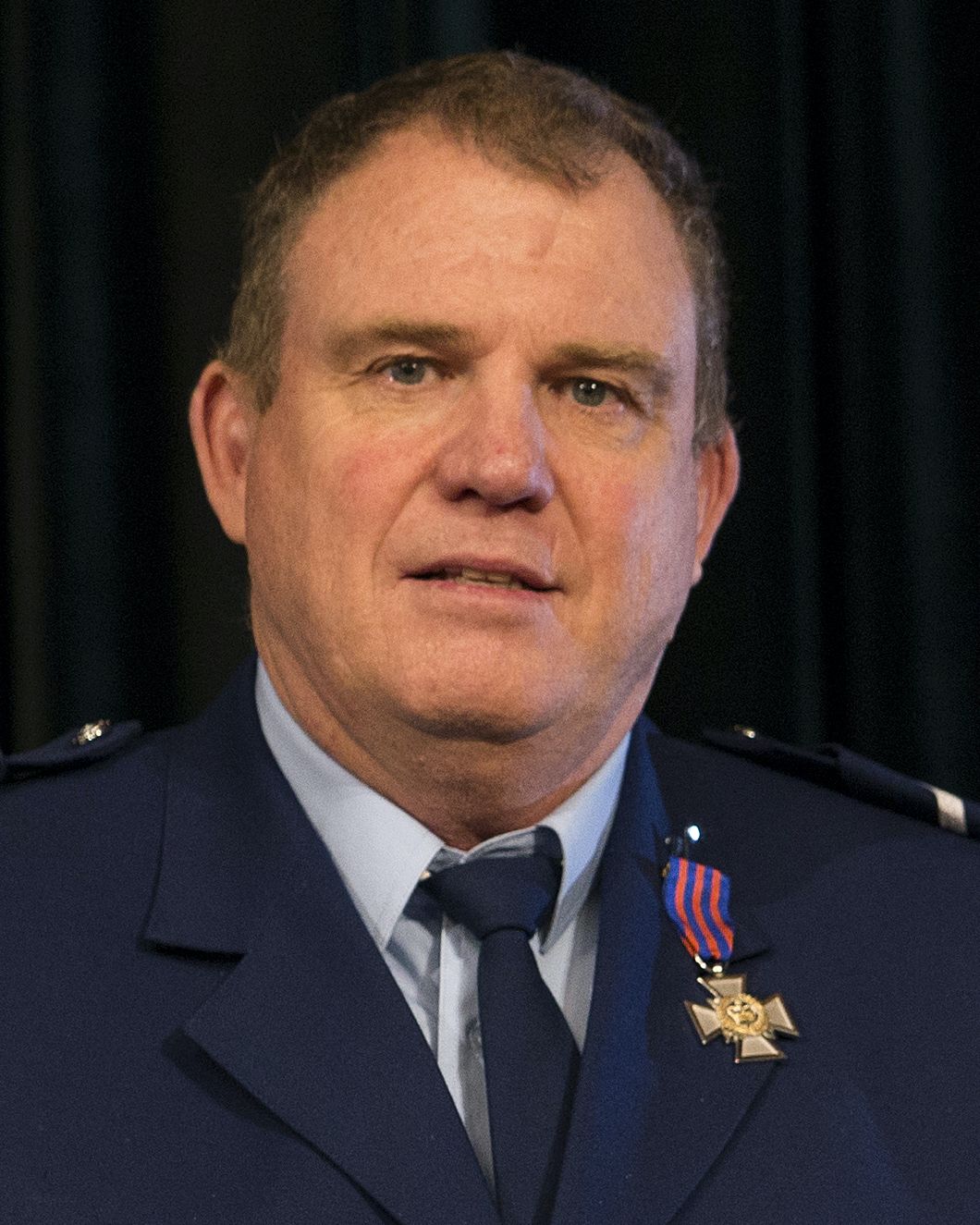
Jim Manning

== New Zealand Bravery Medal (NZBM) ==
The New Zealand Bravery Medal was awarded for an act of bravery:

- Lance Henry Bradford
- Wayne Maley
- Mark Garry Miller
- Michael James Robinson
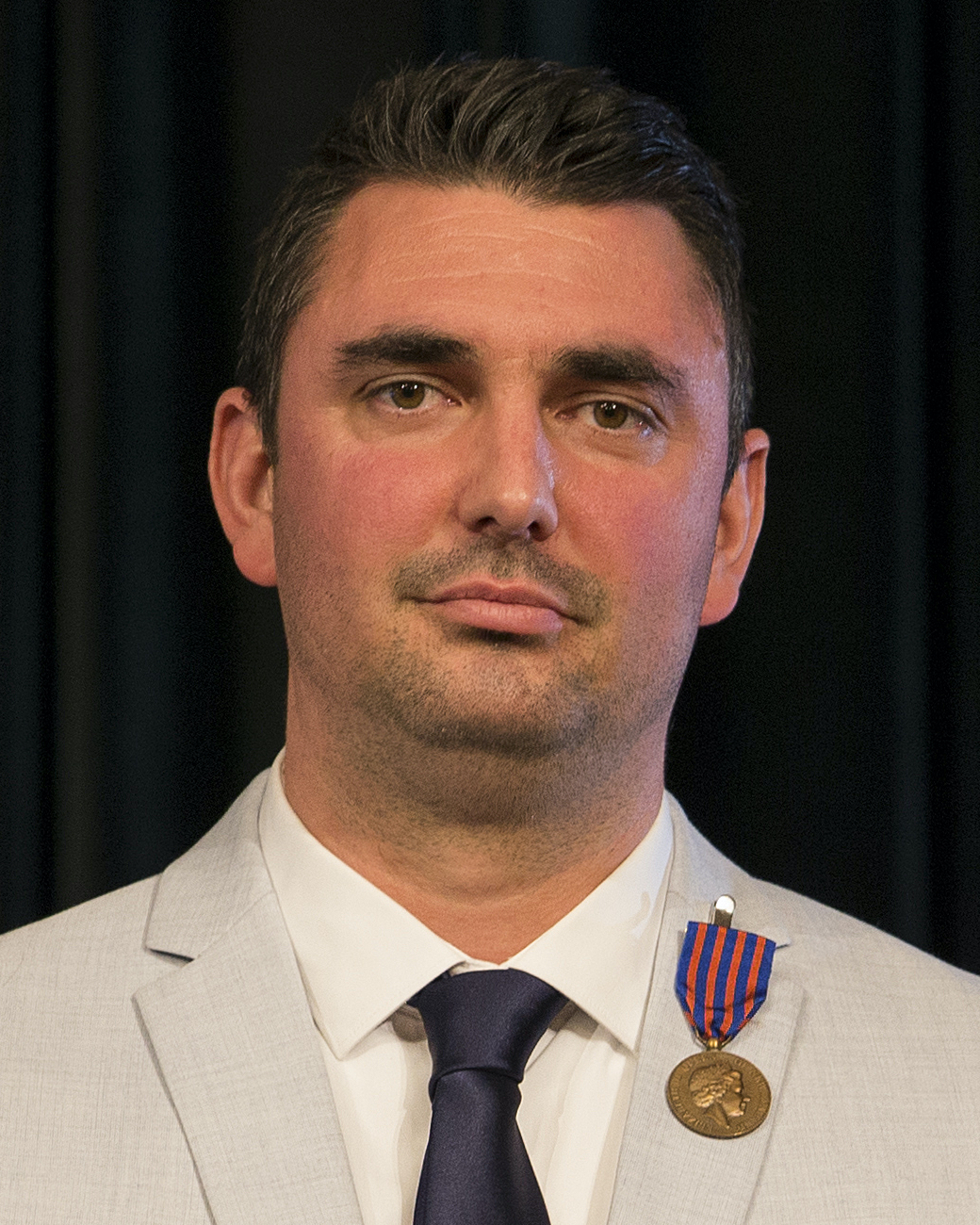
Lance Bradford

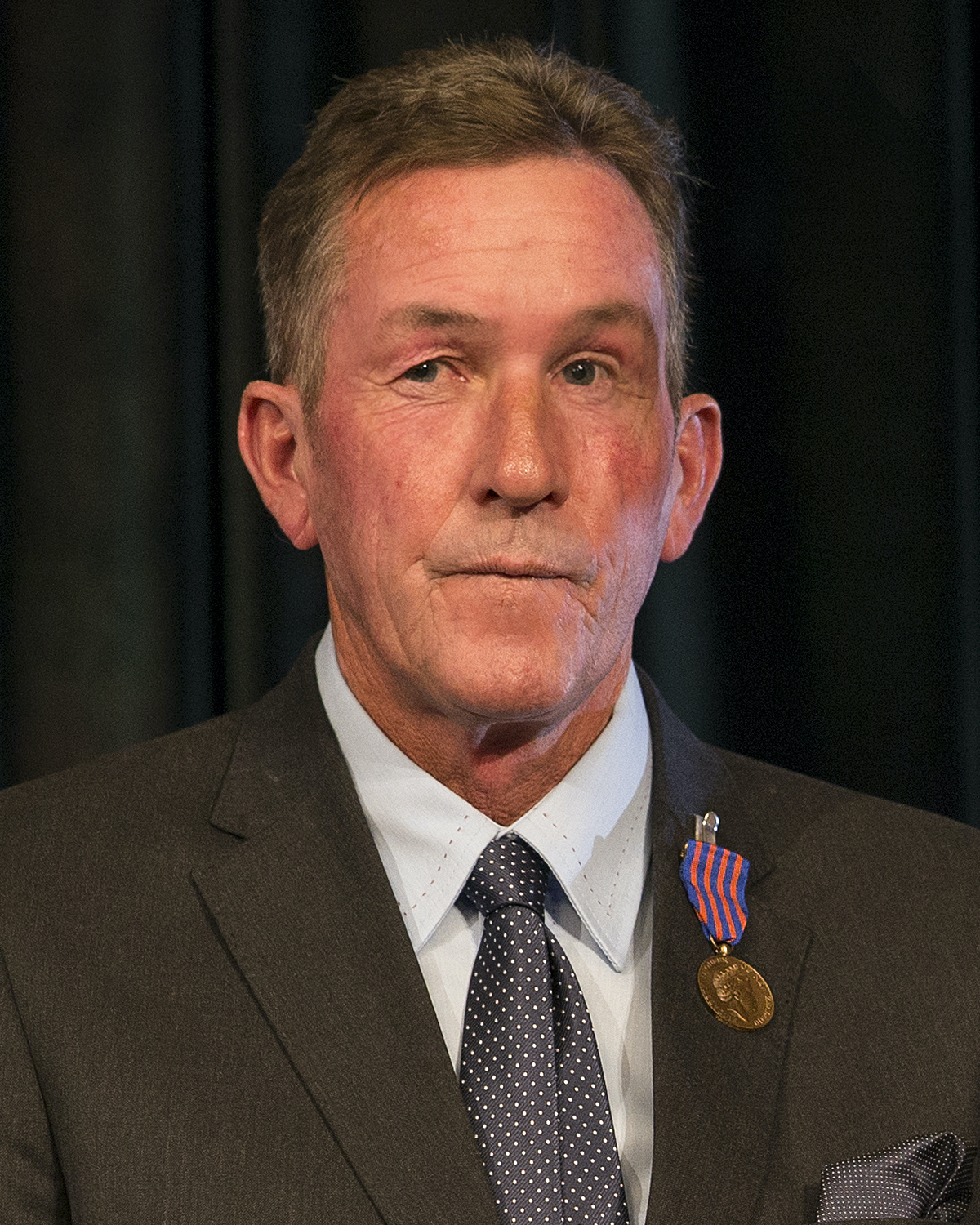
Wayne Maley

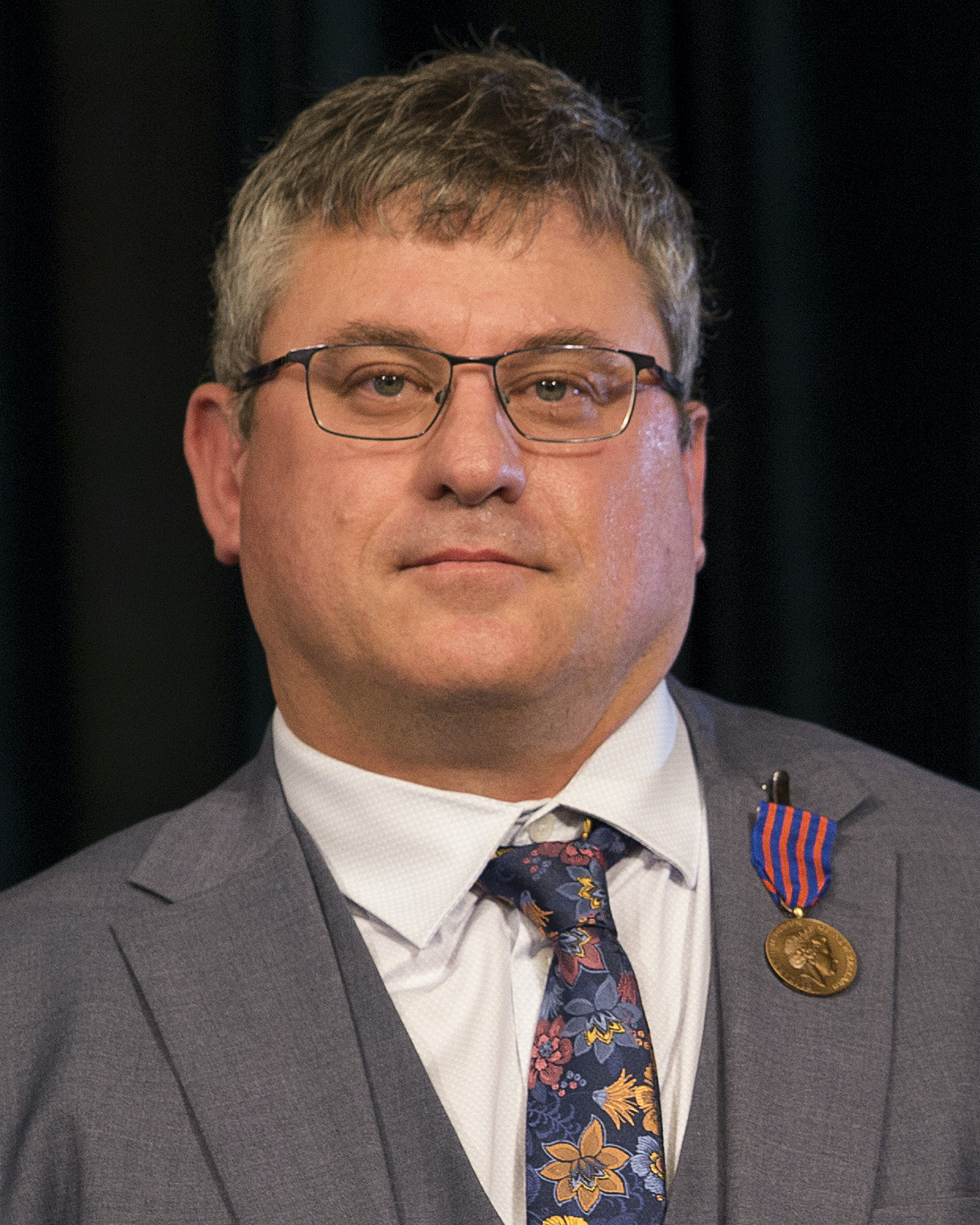
Mike Robinson
