= Hamid Rahimi =

Afghan-German boxer (born 1983)

Hamid Rahimi حمید رحیمی
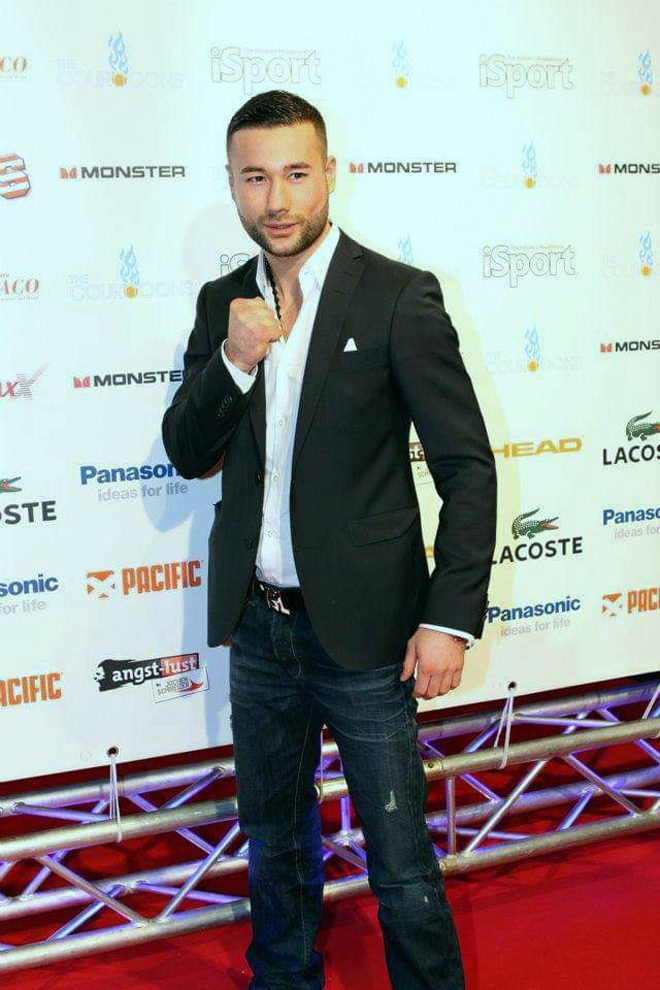

Personal information
- Nickname: The Dragon
- Nationality: Afghan Germans
- Born: Hamidullah Rahimi; September 12, 1983 (age 42) Kabul, Democratic Republic of Afghanistan
- Height: 5 ft 11 1/2 in (182 cm)

Boxing career

Boxing record
- Total fights: 24
- Wins: 23
- Win by KO: 11
- Losses: 1

Hamid Rahimi (Dari: حمید رحیمی) is a boxer from Afghanistan. He currently resides in Germany. In February 2012, he won the New World Boxing Union (WBU) Championship by defeating his Belarusian rival in Hamburg.

He also holds dual German citizenship. He left Germany and arrived at Kabul on 4 March 2011, where he met the Afghan National Olympic Committee.

== Early life and career ==
Hamid Rahimi was born on September 12, 1983, into an ethnic Hazara family in Kabul, Afghanistan.

=== First professional boxing match in Afghanistan ===
On 30 October 2012 the first professional boxing match in Afghanistan was held in Kabul. The match was against Said Mbelwa from Tanzania for the WBO Intercontinental Middleweight Title. It ended in the 7th round when Mbelwa quit because of a shoulder injury. The match was broadcast on Afghanistan's national television. After winning the match, during a press conference Rahimi stated that he dedicated the award to the people of Afghanistan.

21 Wins (10 knockouts, 11 decisions), 1 Loss (0 knockouts, 1 decision), 0 Draws
Res.	Record	Opponent	Type	Rd., Time	Date	Location	Notes
Win	23–1	(Czech Republic) Bronislav Kubin	TKO	1 (12)	2014-04-12	Telekom Dome, Bonn, Germany	
Win	22–1	(Belarus) Aliaksei Volchan	UD	6	2013-05-25	Sporthalle, Hamburg, Germany	
Win	21–1	(Tanzania) Said Mbelwa	TKO	7	2012-10-30	Kabul Stadium, Kabul, Afghanistan	Won vacant WBO Intercontinental middleweight belt
Win	20–1	(Belarus) Ruslan Rodivich	TKO	8 (12)	2012-02-24	Le Royal, Hamburg, Germany	Won vacant World Boxing Union (German Version) middleweight title
Win	19–1	(Germany) Turgay Uzun	TKO	6 (8)	2011-09-16	Golden Event Center, Hamburg, Germany	
Win	18–1	(Hungary) Attila Kiss	PTS	6	2011-04-08	Class, Hamburg, Germany	
Win	17–1	(Germany) Bekay Elson	TKO	3 (6)	2011-03-19	Fritidscenter, Ribe, Denmark	
Loss	16–1	(Hungary) Attila Kiss	PTS	8	2010-12-03	Arena Sparta, Prague, Czech Republic	
Win	16–0	(Armenia) Armen Azizian	TKO	4 (12)	2010-08-26	Peter Jensen Lagerhaus, Hamburg, Germany	Won interim PABA Middleweight Title
Win	15–0	(Germany) Andy Thiele	TKO	11 (12)	2010-06-17	Peter Jensen Open Air, Kiel, Germany	Won vacant GBC Intercontinental Middleweight Title
Win	14–0	(Hungary) Jozsef Siklodi	KO	1 (6)	2010-03-27	Sporthalle, Alsterdorf, Germany	
Win	13–0	(Czech Republic) Kamil Mitras	TKO	2 (6)	2010-02-27	Fitnesstreff, Schwarzenbek, Germany	
Win	12–0	(Czech Republic) Karel Zdarsa	TKO	4 (6)	2009-11-21	Dithmarsen Park, Albersdorf, Germany	
Win	11–0	(Latvia) Jevgenijs Kiseljovs	MD	4	2009-10-24	Kugelbake-Halle, Cuxhaven, Germany	
Win	10–0	(Germany) Karim Allous	PTS	6	2009-07-25	Mario's Gym, Berlin, Germany	
Win	9–0	(Germany) Andreas Roeder	PTS	6	2006-06-12	Rene Hartmann Center, Dudelange, Luxembourg	
Win	8–0	(Austria) Thomas Hengstberger	UD	6	2009-03-06	Kugelbake-Halle, Cuxhaven, Germany	
Win	7–0	(Turkey) Tahir Celic	TKO	2 (6)	2008-11-22	Stadthalle, Westerburg, Germany	
Win	6–0	(Belgium) Yves Romainville	UD	4	2008-10-10	Mittelandhalle, Barleben, Germany	
Win	5–0	(Belarus) Ihar Filonau	SD	4	2007-07-06	Arena Gym, Hamburg, Germany	
Win	4–0	(Poland) Adam Gawlik	PTS	4	2007-03-24	Sporthalle, Alsterdorf, Germany	
Win	3–0	(Czech Republic) Zsolt Botos	PTS	6	2007-02-10	Arena Gym, Hamburg, Germany	
Win	2–0	(Romania) Viorel Otava	UD	4	2006-12-15	Sporthalle, Alsterdorf, Germany	
Win	1–0	(Slovakia) Slavomir Merva	UD	4	2006-11-10	Sporthalle, Alsterdorf, Germany	Rahimi's professional debut

== See also ==
- Afghans in Germany
