= Offenbach =

Offenbach may refer to:

== Places ==
- Offenbach am Main, a city in Hesse, Germany
  - Kickers Offenbach, football club
  - VfB 1900 Offenbach, football club
- Offenbach (district), a kreis in Hesse, Germany
- Offenbach an der Queich, a municipality in Südliche Weinstraße, Rhineland-Palatinate, Germany
  - Offenbach an der Queich (Verbandsgemeinde), the collective municipality surrounding the town above
- Offenbach-Hundheim, a municipality in Kusel, Rhineland-Palatinate, Germany

== People ==
- Jacques Offenbach (1819–1880), German-born French composer, cellist and impresario
- Isabella Offenbach Maas (1817–1891), Opera singer, pianist and sister of Jacques Offenbach
- John Louis of Isenburg-Offenbach (fl. 1635–1685), German aristocrat

== Other uses ==
- Offenbach (band), Quebec rock band
- 10820 Offenbach, a main-belt asteroid
- Offenbach Archival Depot, a post World War II document collection facility
- A typeface created by Rudolf Koch

== See also ==
- Ofenbach (DJs), French DJs based in Paris
- Ofenbach (Lanzenkirchen), a cadastral community in Austria
