= Ahmad Milad Karimi =

- Born: 10 February 1979 (age 47); Kabul, Afghanistan
- Education: University of Freiburg; University of Delhi
- Occupations: Philosopher of religion Scholar of Islam; Translator; Poet
- Employer: University of Münster
- Known for: Qur'an translation and Islamic philosophy
- Awards: Rumi Award for Islamic Studies

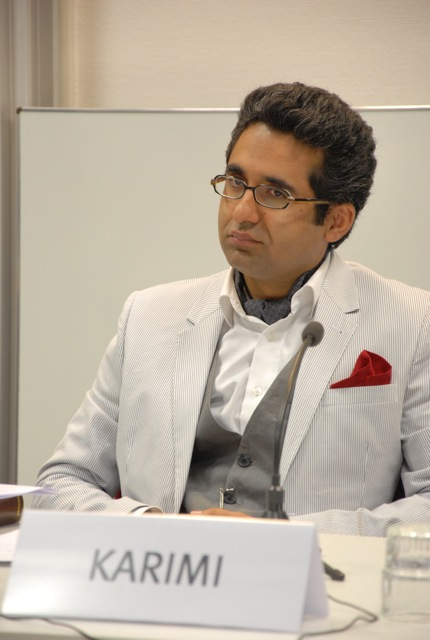
Ahmad Milad Karimi

Ahmad Milad Karimi (born 10 February 1979) is an Afghan-born German philosopher of religion, scholar of Islam, translator of the Koran, and poet. Karimi is professor of Islamic Philosophy at the University of Münster.

== Early life ==
Ahmad Milad Karimi was born in Kabul, Afghanistan in 1979. He and his family fled the Afghan civil war when he was 13.

== Career ==
From 2001 to 2011 Karimi was a Fellow of the German National Academic Foundation as an undergraduate and Doctoral candidate. Karimi studied philosophy and Islamic studies from 2000 to 2006 at the Albert Ludwig University in Freiburg and at Delhi University in India. In 2012, Karimi was promoted to D.Phil with a thesis on the work of Georg Hegel and Heidegger. In 2009, Karimi produced a new poetical-translation of the Koran Since summer 2016, Karimi has been a regular professor for Kalām, Islamic Philosophy und Mysticism at the University of Münster.

== Reception ==
For his diversity and his "rise from refugee to professor", Karimi is described as "Germany's most dynamic philosophers of religion" (Qantara), "one of the most prominent Islamic scholars in Europe", and one of the "distinctive heads of Islam in Germany". For his work dedication as the "most extraordinary" book of 2015 in the field of Islamic studies in the German-speaking world, Karimi received the Rumi Award for Islamic Studies for his work "Hingabe. Grundfragen der systematisch-islamischen Theologie".

== Personal life ==
Karimi is married and has a son and a daughter.

== Bibliography ==
- Dedication of basic questions of systematic Islamic theology, Grundfragen der systematisch-islamischen Theologie. Rombach, Freiburg 2015. ISBN 978-3793098003
- Osama bin Laden sleeps with the fish. Why I like to be Muslim and why Marlon Brando has a lot to do with it., Osama bin Laden schläft bei den Fischen. Warum ich gerne Muslim bin und wieso Marlon Brando damit viel zu tun hat. Herder, Freiburg 2013. ISBN 978-3-451-30470-5
- Identity - difference - contradiction., Identität - Differenz - Widerspruch. Hegel und Heidegger. Rombach, Freiburg 2012. ISBN 978-3793096979
- The Koran. Completely and newly translated by Ahmad Milad Karimi., Der Koran. Vollständig und neu übersetzt von Ahmad Milad Karimi. Hg. von Bernhard Uhde. Herder, Freiburg 2009. ISBN 978-3-451-30292-3
- Presence of unity. The concept of religion. Written in honor of Bernhard Uhde., Gegenwart der Einheit. Zum Begriff der Religion. Festschrift zu Ehren von Bernhard Uhde. Rombach 2008. ISBN 978-3-7930-9550-7
- Embarrassment, Verlegenheit. Pragun 2006. ISBN 81-89645-41-2
- Poetry with drawings: Hörsturz. Pragun 2006. ISBN 81-89645-40-4
- Be right. Anthology., Stimmen. Anthologie. Literareon 2003. ISBN 3-8316-1077-0
