= Zohre Esmaeli =

Afghan model, designer and author (born 1985)

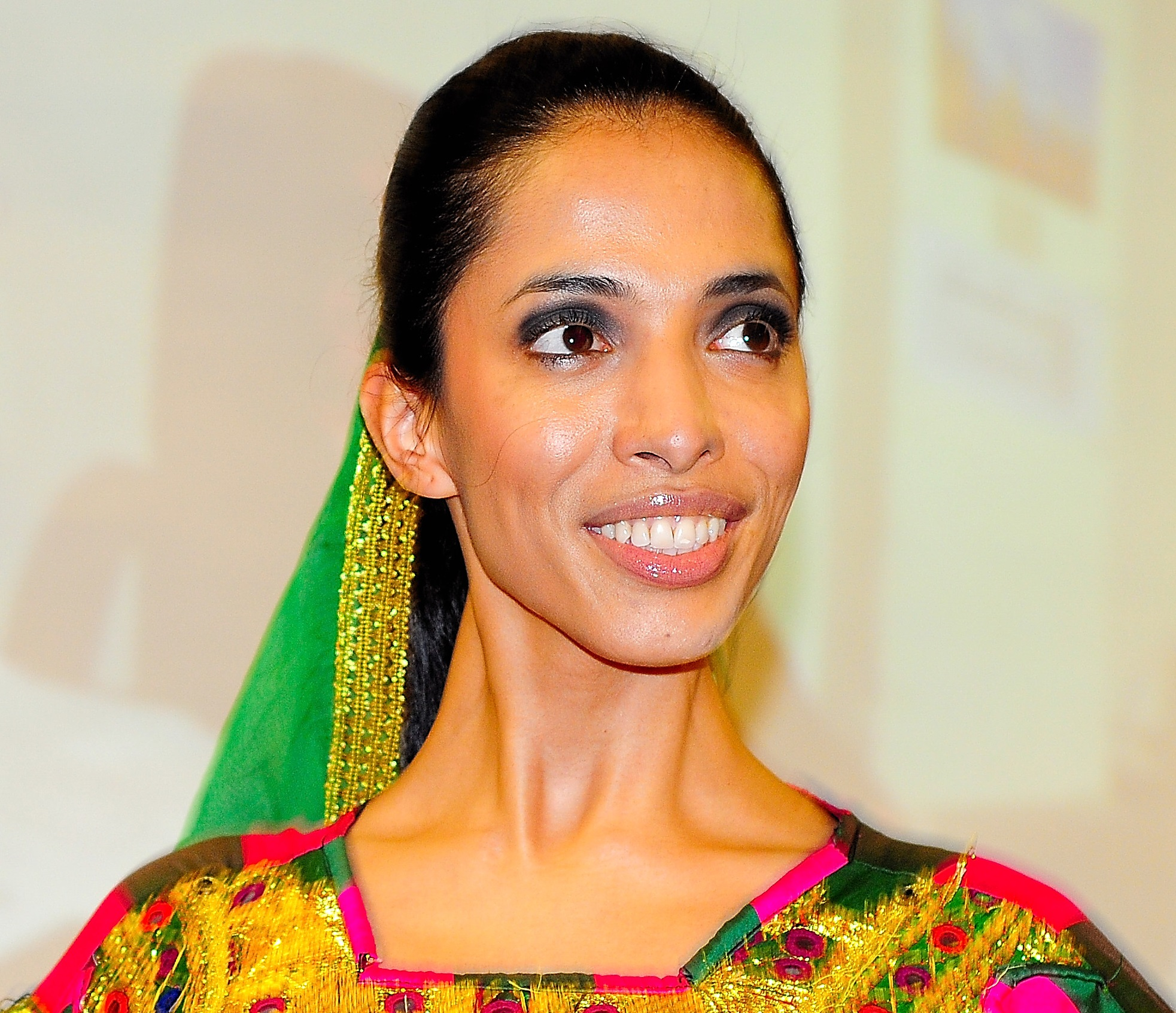
- Zohre Esmaeli, November 2011
- Born: July 1, 1985 (age 40); Kabul, Afghanistan
- Other name: Sara Esmaeli
- Occupations: Model, designer, author
- Years active: 2001–present
- Modeling information
- Height: 175.5 cm (5 ft 9 in)
- Hair color: black
- Eye color: brown
- Agency: Patron of the Arts, CONMIA Model Management

Zohre Esmaeli (born 1 July 1985) is a model, designer and author from Afghanistan. She lives in Berlin, Germany. She was said to be the only international top model from Afghanistan in 2014.

== Biography ==
=== Early years ===
Zohre Esmaeli was born on July 1, 1985, in Kabul, the youngest of seven children. Her mother, who was her father's second wife, died in a traffic accident when she was two years old. She was raised by her dad's first wife and has four brothers and two sisters. Like her sisters, as a girl, she could not attend a public school, but after pleading with her father he agreed to her being home schooled by private tutors.

=== Escape from Afghanistan ===
When Esmaeli was thirteen years old, her parents sold all their belongings and decided to leave Afghanistan to escape from the war and the Taliban regime. Her father left Kabul with three of his children and his second wife on the load bed of a truck. They paid a Russian people smuggling gang to bring them to Germany to join her brothers who already lived there. Their difficult and 10000 km long journey took six months, via Iran, Kazakhstan, Russia, Ukraine, and the Czech Republic, but in 1999, they finally crossed the border to Bavaria. During the dangerous journey with long wintry walks through woods, and rides hidden in train waggons and car boots, Zohre Esmaili nearly drowned crossing a border river in Slovakia. The family were imprisoned for several days in Ukraine where Esmaili became seriously ill due to malnutrition and bad hygienic conditions. After arriving in Germany, the family first stayed in three asylum seekers' hostels in Darmstadt, Schwalbach, and Calden, before moving to their own flat in Vellmar near Kassel.

=== Life in Germany ===
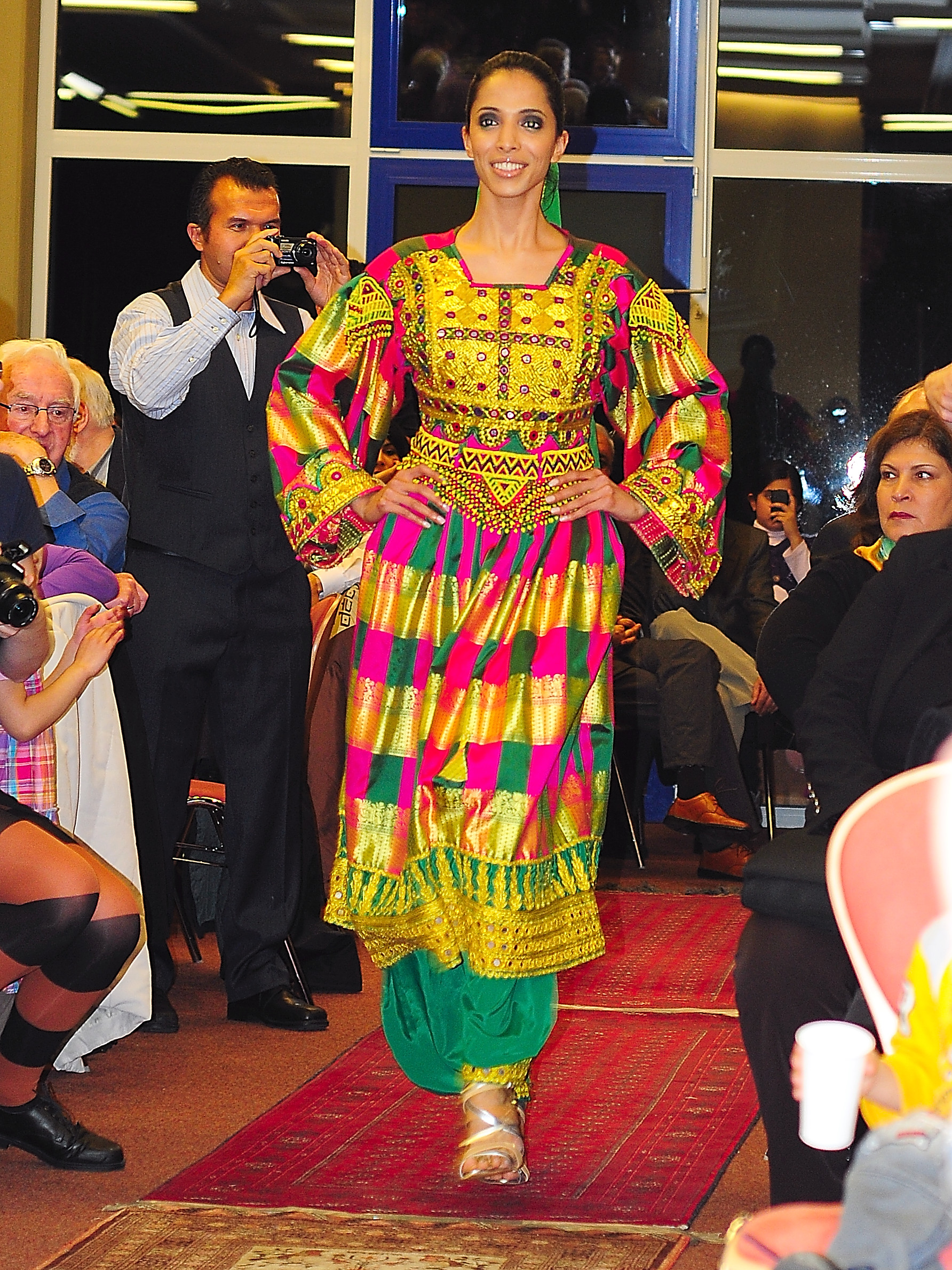
Zohre Esmaeli presenting Afghan fashion at the fashion show "Afghanische Nacht" in Bad Kreuznach on 5 November 2011 in support of the charity Afghanistan - Hilfe die ankommt (photo: S.Herler)

Zohre Esmaeli attended a comprehensive school and after an internship she wanted to pursue the career of an airplane electronics engineer. Her school years were difficult for her as she and her brother were the only foreigners in the class at her first school and also after moving to Vellmar she was bullied at her school in Ahnatal. Although now staying in Germany, her father and older brothers insisted on her living according to the Afghan tradition and had chosen a husband for her to marry. In order to escape from the family pressures and live according to her own wishes Zohre Esmaeli left at age 17 her family in spring of 2003 and moved into a children's home. After 12 days she ran away and went into hiding in Zuffenhausen near Stuttgart living with the family of her then boyfriend. During her first year living there she did not have any contact with her family. Later Esmaeli established again a normal relationship with her father although she does not discuss her work at home. Esmaeli speaks four languages, Dari (her mother tongue), Persian, English, and German.

During three weeks in July 2013 a 4x5 meter large picture of Esmaeli could be seen by S-Bahn travellers in Düsseldorf on an empty windowless house wall which was painted by airbrush artist Andi Ponto. It was a birthday present of her boyfriend who lived in a house opposite of the wall. By order of the house owner the painting had to be whited out by the artist.

Her brother, Abdul Gharfour Esmaeli, is a cruiserweight boxer who started his professional career at the Internationale Box-Gala in Kassel in November 2012.

== Career ==
When Zohre Esmaeli was 16 years old the then current Miss Hessen approached her during a shopping trip in a H&M store in Kassel and asked if she was a model and wanted to have photos taken. She agreed and two days later she went to a model agency and started to do secret shootings without telling her parents. Her first shooting took place in Frankfurt. This, however, soon came to an end when her family found out and forbade her to continue. About a year after she had left her family and moved to Stuttgart she resumed her modeling career. Her first big clients were the furniture manufacturer Bretz who made her the centre of a large advertising campaign from 2003 until 2007 and the German designer Manfred Bogner who featured her from 2007 in many adverts for his fashion line BONNIE which were published in magazines like Vogue. Soon she appeared in other fashion and lifestyle journals as Elle, Cosmopolitan, Madame, Zink, Lounge, InStyle and Marie Claire. On 30 April 2004 Esmaeli took for Afghanistan part in the Queen of the World beauty pageant in Munich.

In 2006, Belgian designer Gerald Watelet discovered Esmaeli and she ran the catwalk for his label at the Fashion Week in Paris. She currently appears in fashion shows and photo shoots in New York, Paris, Milan and Berlin.

In February 2014 Zohre Esmaeli published her book Meine neue Freiheit. Von Kabul über den Laufsteg zu mir selbst in which she describes her story, the situation in Kabul, the months-long flight from Afghanistan and her life as a refugee in Germany. Esmaeli works also as independent fashion adviser in Düsseldorf.

Zohre Esmaeli designed her own fashion collection "Zoraya" which was first presented at a charity fashion show on 13 November 2015 in Berlin to help raise funds for her new project "Culture Coaches" which supports refugees.

== Social engagements ==
Zohre Esmaeli works with several German charities. She supports the charity Afghanistan - Hilfe die ankommt e.V. in Bad Kreuznach by taking part in fund-raising events like fashion shows and is especially involved in their sewing project. She also supports the international charity program Women for Women, which was developed by Dr. Marita Eisenmann-Klein, the Secretary General of IPRAS, the International Society for Plastic Reconstructive and Aesthetic Surgery and Dr. Constance Neuhann-Lorenz, the Chairperson of Quality Assurance of IPRAF, the International Plastic, Reconstructive and Aesthetic Surgery Foundation

In 2014 Esmaeli was made ambassador of the German Federal Anti-Discrimination Agency.

=== Save Society ===
Esmaeli is ambassador of the German charity Save Society which fights against discrimination. Other ambassadors of the charity are the German épée fencer Monika Sozanska, runner Marius Broening, actress Vanessa Eichholz and film producer Catherine Ackermann. Official supporters include the members of the German Bundestag Stefan Kaufmann and Hartmut Koschyk.

=== Culture Coaches ===
Based on her own experience as refugee Esmaeli founded the project "Culture Coaches" to help the sustainable integration of refugees. The project wants to give newly arrived families from the start an insight into German culture and the values of German society by developing a bicultural didactics and a tutor team. It is supported by the Bürgerstiftung Berlin, a charitable foundation under the patronage of Wolfgang Thierse, which was started 1999 by Berlin citizens. The costs of the project have been raised by crowd funding and through a refugee fundraising event on 13 November 2015 in Berlin which raised the indented target of 40,000 Euros.

== TV appearances and radio broadcasts ==
- Guten Abend, RTL (TV, 12.2011)
- Frank Elstner: Menschen der Woche, SWR (TV, 11.02.2012)
- Couchgespräche, SWR-RP (TV, 19.11.2012)
- glanz & gloria, SRF (TV, 22.05.2013)
- WDR Lokalzeit, WDR (TV, 21.08.2013
- Markus Lanz, ZDF (TV, 20.02.2014)
- mittagsmagazin, ZDF (TV, 21.02.2014)
- Eins zu Eins. Der Talk, BR Bayern 2 (Radio, 30.03.2014)
- SWR1 Leute, SWR (Radio, 10.10.2014)
- hallo deutschland, ZDF (TV, 12.11.2014)
- Hart aber fair, ARD (TV, 23.02.2015)
- So gesehen - Talk am Sonntag, Sat.1 (TV, 12.04.2015)
- Christiane Amanpour: Sex & Love Around the World, episode 4, Berlin (Netflix, 07.04.2018)

== Music and film videos ==
- Swarm (2011, music video by Jens Hocher for Badmarsh & Shri, awarded the Intervideo - Young Talent award)
- The Grief of the Wind (2011, short film by Jens S. Achtert)

== Books ==
- Zohre Esmaeli; Barbara Opitz; Kuno Kruse (2014), Meine neue Freiheit. Von Kabul über den Laufsteg zu mir selbst (in German) (1. ed.), Köln: Bastei Lübbe, ISBN 978-3-404-60772-3
- Esmaeli, Zohre (2019), Heimatkunde. Warum ich stolz bin, Deutsche zu sein (in German), München: C. Bertelsmann, ISBN 978-3-570-10374-6

== Exhibition ==
- Zohre escaped (2013) 6.4.-14.4.2013 Pfaffenhofen, photos by Richard Kienberger
