= Ahesta Bero =

Musical composition used in Afghan weddings

Ahesta Bero (Dari: آهسته برو) or Ohista Birav (Tajik: оҳиста бирав), literally meaning "walk slowly" ("walk graciously"), is a musical composition played to welcome the bride and groom's entrance to the wedding hall in weddings, most often in Afghanistan and the Afghan diaspora.

Usually the accompanied couple is walked slowly under the sanction of the Qur'an, as the attending guests rise in honor of the holy book. This anthem is a very strong tradition in these marriage ceremonies. The song itself is believed to have originally been composed by the folk singer Abdul Rahim (Ustad) Sarban in the mid-20th century.

== Lyrics ==
The following is a transliteration of the Dari version of the song.

In qafelaye omor ajab megozarad
Ahesta boro, mahe man ahesta bero
Daryab dame ke ba tarab megozarad
Ahesta boro, mahe man ahesta bere
Saqi ghame farday harifan chi khori
Ahesta boro, mahe man ahesta bero
Pesh ar peyala ra ke shab megozarad
Ahesta boro, mahe man ahesta bero
Ahesta boro, sarwe rawan ahesta bero
Ahesta boro, dokhtar khan ahesta bero
Ay charkh falak kharbi az kinaye tust
Bedad gari shewaye dirinaye tust
Ay khak agar seenaye tu beshgafand
Bas gowhar qeemati dar seenaye tust

== See also ==
- Afghan wedding
