= Graziella Schazad =

German singer-songwriter (born 1983)

Graziella Schazad (born 2 July 1983 in Berlin) is a German singer-songwriter based in Hamburg.

== Personal life ==
Schazad was born to an Afghan father and a Polish mother, growing up in the Berlin districts of Moabit and Charlottenburg-Wilmersdorf. Graziella began learning the guitar at the age of three and the violin at the age of four. She later received a piano. Schazad studied classical violin and piano at the Carl Philipp Emanuel Bach music school.

== Career ==
=== For Paradise and Jail ===
In 1998 she founded the folk duo For P'n'J (For Paradise and Jail) with her classmate Stefanie Sass. The pair dropped out of high school in 2000 before their Abitur to focus entirely on their musical career.

In February 2003, as For P'n'J, they made it to the final of the ARD show Deutschlands Talente. They also gained international experience at concerts and festivals throughout Europe.

=== Solo ===
Following the breakup of the duo, Schazad married her now husband and moved to Hamburg to start a solo career. On 25 October 2007 she appeared on German television singing Prince's Nothing Compares 2 U on the talk show TV total.

With producer Benni Dernhoff, Schazad released her self-titled debut EP in August 2008. When she played alone, she liked to record loops of her instruments on a sampler she had brought with her, and then play live to the previously recorded melodies. This was a big part of the allure of her many live performances in 2008 which elevated her popularity and led to her being signed by Warner Music.

Joined by producer, Henrik Menzel, Schazard recorded and released the single Look at Me, which came out on CD in April 2009, and also recorded a music video for it.

On 7 March 2009 she had an unplugged performance on The Dome in Hanover. In July 2009 she supported Joss Stone at the Blue Balls Festival in Lucerne, Switzerland.

Schazad began work on her debut album Feel Who I Am with co-writing sessions in London, Stockholm, Hamburg and Berlin with authors Chris Braide (James Morrison, Kylie Minogue ), Matty Benbrook (Paolo Nutini), Michel van Dyke (Echt, Ruben Cossani) and Martin Gallop (Annett Louisan). The first single from this was released in August 2010, a cover version of the A-ha classic Take On Me. The album Feel Who I Am was released on 15 October 2010. The album charted at no. 60 in Germany and stayed for two weeks.

== Discography ==
Albums

- Blue Twine. Songs & Ballads for an Irish Horse. Das Pferd in den Liedern der Irischen Travellers. (with Stefanie Sass), 2003
- Feel Who I Am, Warner Music, 2010

Singles/EPs

- EP Graziella Schazad, DooLoad Media, August 2008
- EP/Single Look at Me, Warner Music, April 2009
- Single Take On Me, Warner Music, August 2010
- Single Safe, Warner Music, April 2011
