= Afghan New Zealanders =

Total population
- Afghan New Zealanders; 5,250 Afghan-born (2018)

Regions with significant populations
- Auckland, Christchurch, Hamilton, Wellington, Palmerston North

Languages
- Pashto, Persian (Dari and Hazaragi dialect), New Zealand English

Religion
- Predominantly: Islam (Sunni majority and Shia minority)

Related ethnic groups
- Afghan diaspora, Pashtuns, Tajiks, Uzbeks, Hazara

Afghan New Zealanders are New Zealanders whose ancestors came from Afghanistan or who were born in Afghanistan. The New Zealand government categorises Afghanistan as Central Asian.

== History of immigration ==
Afghan migration to New Zealand started in the late 1980s.

131 Afghans came to New Zealand as refugees on the MV Tampa during the Tampa affair in 2001.

Following the Taliban takeover of Afghanistan in late August 2021, the New Zealand Government offered 1,253 visas to Afghans. The New Zealand Defence Force participated in international efforts to evacuate Afghans who had worked for Western military forces. By early October 2021, only 428 had arrived in New Zealand. In response, the New Zealand Government dispatched a special envoy to the Middle East to help 825 stranded Afghan visa holders to leave Afghanistan.

== Notable people ==
- Abdul Qahar Balkhi
- Najibullah Lafraie
- Omar Slaimankhel
- Abdul Aziz Wahabzadah

== See also ==
- Afghan Australians
- Anti-Afghan sentiment
