= Farid Rastagar =

Afghan singer

Farid Rastagar فرید رستگار
- Born: March 26, 1963 (age 63); Panjshir, Afghanistan
- Genres: Pop
- Years active: Early 1980s

Farid Rastagar (Dari: فريد رستگار)(born 26 March 1963) is from Panjshir, a singer, music arranger, and composer. He is one of the 1980s era singers who rose to popularity as Afghanistan’s pop music was reaching its zenith of maturity. His early albums became highly successful due to the keen detail he gave to the background music all of which he arranged, composed and sang himself. Currently, he continues producing his music from Hamburg, Germany, his home since he emigrated from Afghanistan, often performing in various cities in Europe.

His wife Wajiha Rastagar and his daughter Hadya Rastagar are also singers. He belongs to the Panjsher Valley of Afghanistan.

== Discography ==
- Ghame gandom
- Rah-e-Dor
- Khana-e-Dil
- Delak-e-Khoshbawar
- Hadya
- Dar Parda Hai Saz
- Alocha
- Trirari
- Hasheq Bedarast
- Tarang
