= Wajiha Rastagar =

Afghan singer

Wajiha Rastagar وجیهه رستگار
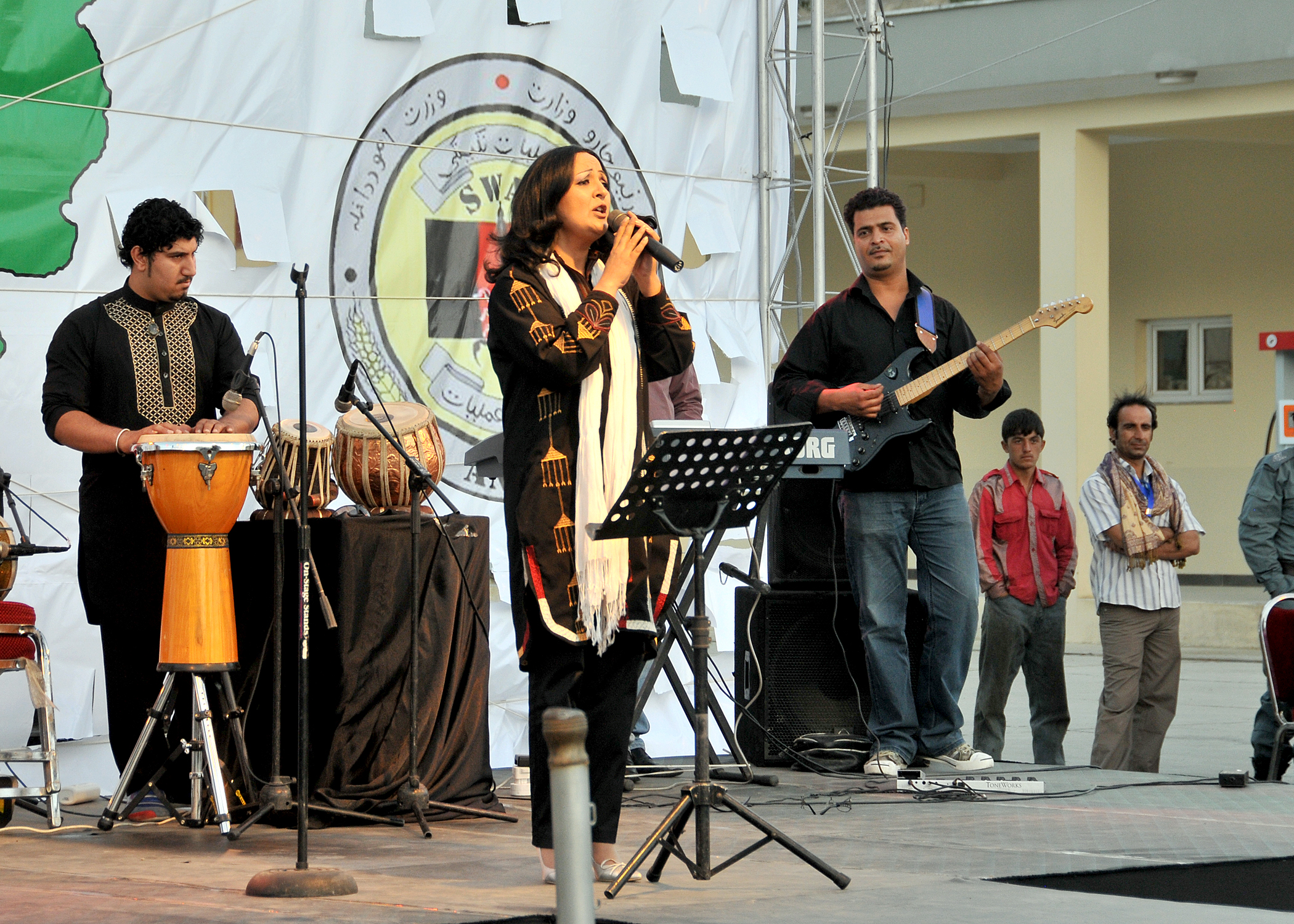
- Wajiha Rastagar performs for members of the Afghan National Civil Order Police in Kabul (2010)

Background information
- Born: May 12, 1967 (age 59); Shashdarak, Kabul, Afghanistan
- Genres: Pop, Folk
- Years active: 1980 or 1982–present
- Spouse: Farid Rastagar

Wajiha Rastagar (born 12 May 1967) is a singer from Afghanistan. She is the wife of fellow singer and composer Farid Rastagar. She sings in Dari and Pashto. She currently lives in Germany along with her husband & children, and she continues her career from there. Wajiha Rastagar was a student in primary school when she participated in the school’s cultural programmes.

In the mid-1980s, she and her band experimented with synthesizers and therefore the sound of her music at that time had a lot of influence from British and American new wave bands.

She married Farid Rastagar, who was the music arranger and singer in "Guli Surkh". Wajiha Rastagar has been singing several Afghan songs, among which are some Afghan folk songs.

She came into focus again when she performed her album Delk-i-khoshbawar very nicely. Delk-i-khoshbawar won the bestseller award in 2003 from Khorasan Music. Wajiha Rastagar has received the title of "Best singer of the year" both in Afghanistan and Europe.

Farid and Wajiha have been living in exile in Germany since 1992. They have released 5 CDs and music videos in exile and have had more than 40 concerts since 1993 in Europe, Australia, Canada and the US.

Hadia Rastagar is the 7-year-old daughter of Wajiha and Farid Rastagar. She is the singer of "Alocha", the first children's song album in Afghanistan. She is playing only two instruments: zerbaghali and a keyboard.

== Albums ==
- Rahi dor
- Khana-i-del
- Delak-i-khoshbawar
- Hadia
- Dar parda hai saz
- Alocha

== International tours ==
- 1981: International Music Festival in Berlin, Germany
- 1982: International Music Festival in Czech Republic
- 1983: Asian Festival in Tajikistan
- 1984: Indian Ghazal & Classic Music Festival in India
- 1985: World Festival in Moscow, Russia
- 1986: Asian Festival Of Uzbekistan & Tajikistan in Tajikistan
- 1987: Pop Music Concert in Middle East
- 1989: International Asian concert in Kazakhstan
- 1990: Asian festival in Turkey

Beside these she has appeared in numerous concerts with her husband in many parts of the world including London, Germany, and Canada.
