= Identity Number (Israel) =

Number assigned by the Population Registry

Identity Number מִסְפַּר זֶהוּת
- Identification number as it appears on a biometric identity card
- Acronym: ת.ז
- No. of digits: 9
- Check digit: Weighted sum

Identity number (Hebrew: מִסְפַּר זֶהוּת) in Israel is a number assigned by the Population Registry which is maintained by the Population and Immigration Authority within the Ministry of Interior to every resident of Israel (including temporary and permanent residents who are not citizens), as well as to Israeli citizens who are not residents of Israel.

This number is inscribed on each resident's identity card; hence, it is commonly referred to as an "identity card number" (Hebrew: מספר תעודת זהות). In reality, however, an individual's identity number is assigned from the moment their birth is registered or from the moment they receive a certain status and is not related to the physical card itself.

== Usage ==
The identity number accompanies a resident of Israel throughout their life. It is first assigned upon the registration of birth and subsequently appears on the birth certificate. It appears on one’s identity card, passport, driver's license, tax documents, bank accounts and banking documents, and even on Israel Defense Forces credentials—such as a soldier's identification booklet, an officer's ID, a reserve duty booklet, and the exemption certificate issued to those released from military service. Following a resident’s death, their identity number appears on the death certificate, as well as on inheritance orders and probate orders. Furthermore, it is customary to include the identity number in various private and legal documents, including contracts, affidavits, statements of claim, and indictments. While other specific identifiers exist—such as a license number on a driver’s license, a military personal number on an IDF ID, or a passport number—the identity number remains a constant across all these documents.

A resident’s identity number cannot be changed. it remains with the individual throughout their entire life and is never deleted from the Population Registry—even in the event of emigration or death (in which case it serves to identify the deceased regarding their estate). Exceptions to this rule include the adoption of a minor by court order, wherein the minor is assigned a new name and identity number. This is intended to completely sever the connection between the minor and their biological parents, ensuring the latter cannot locate them. Additionally, the Witness Protection Authority is authorized to change the identity number of a protected witness.

During the period between the conclusion of Between the Six-Day War and the establishment of the Palestinian Authority, identification numbers were assigned to residents of the territories (recorded on orange identity cards issued to them, to distinguish them from the blue identity cards held by residents of Israel). Upon the establishment of the Palestinian Authority, the Israeli authorities transferred the database containing the identification numbers of the residents of the territories to the Palestinian Authority.

== Identity Number Census ==
As the War of Independence neared its end, and in preparation for the elections to the Constituent Assembly, the Israeli government decided to conduct a census of all the country's residents and to assign an identity number to each one. There were three primary reasons for conducting this census:

- To determine the number of residents in Israel—both Jews and Arabs—at the time of the state's establishment, and to ascertain the character of the State of Israel at its inception.
- To prepare the electoral roll for the Constituent Assembly.
- To establish an organized and systematic population registry based on identity numbers, following the end of British Mandate rule—a period during which no such population registry had existed.

Furthermore, although it was not among the primary reasons for assigning a personal identity number to every resident, the state's security situation also influenced the decision. Israel was approaching the end of the war without fixed borders and lacked the means to prevent hostile infiltrations from neighboring Arab states or from parts of the Land of Israel then under Jordanian control (the West Bank) and Egyptian control (the Gaza Strip). Additionally, the need arose due to the mass immigration that followed the opening of the country's gates to all Jews upon the conclusion of the British Mandate and the formal establishment of Israel. This influx included Olim arriving from Eastern Bloc countries—with whom Israel's relations were increasingly deteriorating—as well as from various Arab nations.

Assigning an identification number to every resident facilitated the achievement of these three objectives, while also enabling adequate security oversight, preventing the assumption of false identities, and allowing for the location of individuals not included in the population registry. Over time, the advantages of this system became apparent in other spheres of life as well—such as in healthcare and social welfare services, the conduct of elections for the Knesset and local authorities, tax collection, statistics, and various other administrative domains. The importance of the identification number for the definitive identification of real estate owners—and for the prevention of real estate fraud—was recognized by the Land Registry Department only in 1960, when it mandated that every registration of rights or encumbrances on real estate must include the individual's identification number. Until then—for a period of 12 years—the registry continued to operate based solely on first and last names, following the practice established during the British Mandate.

On November 8, 1948, a general population census was conducted. The census was organized according to a plan devised by Professor Roberto Bachi, the first director of the Central Bureau of Statistics. To ensure the census was carried out properly, a curfew was imposed on all residents of the country from 5:00 PM until midnight. Approximately 14,000 enumerators, acting on behalf of the Central Bureau of Statistics, went from house to house. A census was conducted of all residents, regardless of their origin (Jews, Arabs, or members of other nationalities), gender, or age (including newborns, infants, and children). Every person enumerated was assigned an identification number. Only later—in preparation for the elections to the Constituent Assembly—were identity cards issued to residents; these cards displayed the number assigned to the individual during the census. As it was a time of war and many were serving in the Israel Defense Forces, the census was also carried out within military bases. Furthermore, it was conducted in the immigrant transit camps scattered throughout the country.

Because the census could not keep pace with the rapid advances of IDF forces in the Negev and the Galilee at the time, it was decided that the census would cover only those areas under the control of the IDF and the state as of October 14, 1948. Consequently, Arab residents in areas captured after this date were not included in the initial census and were enumerated at a later time.

Prior to the census, questionnaires were distributed to every household. During the census, the enumerators reviewed these forms, assisted residents in completing them, and then collected them. The questionnaires gathered personal and demographic details for every member of the household, and an identification number was assigned to each individual. Residents received vouchers from the enumerators, which were later exchanged for official identity cards. Once the enumerators finished registering one household, they moved on to the next and registered its occupants. The residents of each household were assigned sequential identification numbers, with the first number in the sequence following the last number assigned in the previous household. Consequently, all residents of a given street or neighborhood were registered using a continuous series of sequential numbers. Since the population of the State of Israel had not yet reached one million at the time, the assigned identification numbers consisted of four, five, or six digits. Different numerical ranges were allocated to different localities. The initial four- and five-digit numbers were assigned to the residents of Jerusalem, starting with the number 1001. By the time the enumerators reached the northern part of the country—the Jezreel Valley and the Galilee—they were already assigning six-digit numbers to the residents. As a result, for many years, it was possible to determine a person’s locality, neighborhood, and street based solely on their identification number.

Among those registered were 511 immigrants who arrived that same day by ship at the Port of Haifa, as well as approximately 100 immigrants who arrived by plane, landing that day at the Haifa airport.

The Neturei Karta community refused to participate in the census and did not cooperate with the enumerators. However, over time—when they needed ration books during the austerity period, or passports to travel abroad—they gradually registered. On the day of the census, the curfew was enforced by IDF soldiers, members of the People's Guard (Mishmar HaAm), and Gadna youth.

It later emerged that during the census—which relied on oral questioning and the completion of handwritten forms (at a time when computers did not yet exist in Israel) and involved hundreds of thousands of participants—the exact same number had been assigned to a thousand different individuals. This complication created a major mix-up, requiring significant time and effort to resolve.

== Post-census ==
Following the conclusion of the census, parents of newborns were given vouchers at the hospitals where the births took place, directing them to the Ministry of the Interior to complete forms and obtain identification numbers for their infants. It was only from 1952 onwards that identification numbers were issued to newborns directly at the hospitals. For immigrants arriving in Israel after the census, these numbers were assigned upon their arrival—at seaports and airports—and were recorded in their immigrant certificates; subsequently, they were entered into the identity cards issued to them.

== Changes ==
In the early years of the State of Israel, issued identity numbers consisted of four, five, or six digits. In the early 1960s, seven-digit identity numbers were introduced; for the shorter, existing numbers, a single-letter prefix—chosen from the letters Aleph (א) through He (ה), plus Zayin (ז)—was added to the right of the number. Over time, with the introduction of office automation in Israel, this practice was discontinued, and identity numbers on identification documents no longer included letters. (The letter was converted into its numerical value—based on Gematria—and placed to the left of the number; for example, the number "He/1234" [ה/1234] was changed to "05001234".)

In the early 1970s, as the computer age matured, identity numbers were expanded to nine digits. The final digit (on the far right) serves as a check digit, while zeros were added to the left, as needed, to bring the total count to nine digits. The implementation of the check digit took many years; as of 2023, there are still instances where an individual provides their identity number and is asked—to avoid any ambiguity—whether the number includes the check digit.

An identity number is intended to be devoid of inherent meaning; that is, it should not reveal any information about the person to whom it belongs. However, as noted above, when identity numbers were first assigned to the country's residents, a link was established between the number and the location where the individual was registered, as a result of the registration process itself. Another instance occurred when an administrative decision mandated that children adopted abroad be assigned an identification number beginning with a specific, recognizable digit. This decision caused significant harm, as the digit revealed information about the child that is typically kept private. Once the harm became apparent, the decision was rescinded; furthermore, this series of numbers was subsequently assigned to children who were not adopted, thereby neutralizing its specific significance. Additionally, there is a correlation between the identification number and the date of birth: during the 1950s and 1960s, individuals born in Israel were assigned sequentially increasing numbers beginning with the digits "05". Consequently, one can approximate a person's date of birth based on the initial digits of their identification number (e.g., 0534 corresponds to 1956, 0560 to 1959, 0565 to 1960, and so on). The same principle applies to other series of numbers used in later periods. Beginning in June 2023 temporary residents of Israel (holders of A type visa) are also assigned an identity number on an Israeli identity card following complaints they encountered bureaucratic harships for not having it.

== See also ==
- Israeli nationality law
- Immigration to Israel
- Visa policy of Israel
- Israeli passport
