= Visa policy of Israel =

Policy on permits required to enter Israel

Visitors to Israel must obtain a visa unless they are nationals of one of the visa-exempt countries and obtain an electronic travel authorization (ETA-IL). Nationals of certain countries may apply for an electronic visa (e-Visa) online, while others must obtain a visa from an Israeli diplomatic mission.

== Visa policy map ==
Visa policy of Israel Israel Electronic Travel Authorization (ETA-IL) eVisa Visa required Special permit required

== Visa exemptions ==
=== Ordinary passports ===
Nationals of the following countries may enter Israel without a visa for tourist, business or study purposes for up to 90 days, or for culture or sport activities for up to 30 days.

From 1 January 2025, they must obtain an electronic travel authorization (ETA-IL) before travelling to Israel. The ETA-IL costs ILS 25 and is valid for 2 years or until the passport expires, whichever occurs first.

- European Union member states (Note: Nationals of Germany born before 1928 need a visa, which is issued free of charge if they were not involved with the Nazi Party.)
- Albania
- Andorra
- Argentina
- Australia
- Bahamas
- Barbados
- Belarus
- Belize
- Botswana
- Brazil
- Canada
- Chile
- Colombia
- Costa Rica
- Dominica
- Dominican Republic
- Ecuador
- El Salvador
- Eswatini
- Fiji
- Georgia
- Grenada
- Guatemala
- Haiti
- Honduras
- Hong Kong
- Iceland
- Jamaica
- Japan
- Kosovo
- Lesotho
- Liechtenstein
- Macau
- Malawi
- Marshall Islands
- Mauritius
- Mexico
- Micronesia
- Moldova
- Monaco
- Mongolia
- Montenegro
- Nauru
- New Zealand
- North Macedonia
- Norway
- Palau
- Panama
- Papua New Guinea
- Paraguay
- Peru
- Philippines
- Russia
- Saint Kitts and Nevis
- Saint Lucia
- Saint Vincent and the Grenadines
- Samoa
- San Marino
- Serbia
- Singapore
- Solomon Islands
- South Africa
- South Korea
- Suriname
- Switzerland
- Taiwan (Note: Only for holders of passports that include a personal identification number.)
- Tonga
- Trinidad and Tobago
- Tuvalu
- Ukraine
- United Arab Emirates
- United Kingdom
- United States
- Uruguay
- Vanuatu

Date of visa changes

Unknown: Andorra, Grenada, Monaco, Saint Vincent and the Grenadines, Tuvalu

- 15 March 1955: United States
- 1 September 1955: Canada
- 1 October 1956: South Africa
- 11 June 1958: New Zealand
- 1 February 1961: Uruguay
- 15 May 1964: Australia
- 8 December 1964: Belgium, Luxembourg and Netherlands
- 19 February 1966: Paraguay
- 1 April 1966: Denmark, Iceland, Finland, Norway and Sweden
- 17 September 1966: Ecuador
- 10 October 1966: Colombia (resumed)
- 15 March 1967: United Kingdom
- 1 June 1967: Liechtenstein and Switzerland
- 1967: Germany
- 4 March 1968: Jamaica
- 1 May 1968: Peru
- 5 July 1968: Costa Rica
- 31 July 1968: Dominican Republic
- 22 December 1968: Austria
- 28 March 1969: Greece
- 1 April 1969: Trinidad and Tobago
- 13 August 1969: Mauritius
- 18 September 1969: Barbados
- 28 December 1969: France
- 1 January 1970: Philippines
- 1 March 1970: Lesotho
- 29 July 1970: Eswatini
- 1 October 1971: Japan
- 8 September 1972: Guatemala
- 15 December 1972: Fiji
- 18 November 1974: Haiti
- 16 May 1977: San Marino
- 7 June 1977: Suriname
- 25 October 1977: Bahamas
- 9 November 1979: Mexico
- 1979: Italy
- 7 November 1984: Malawi
- 21 February 1985: Saint Kitts and Nevis
- 8 August 1985: Ireland
- 21 December 1987: Dominica
- 1 August 1989: Cyprus
- 9 September 1993: Malta
- 22 November 1993: Slovenia:
- 1 March 1994: Portugal
- 15 March 1994: Hungary
- 23 March 1994: Argentina
- 31 July 1994: Spain
- 1994: Chile
- 15 May 1995: Vanuatu
- 24 May 1995: South Korea
- 14 July 1996: El Salvador
- 19 July 1996: Czech Republic
- 18 February 1997: Mongolia
- 1 July 1997: Hong Kong
- 14 July 1997: Panama
- 2 September 1997: Slovakia
- 15 May 2000: Poland
- 10 July 2000: Saint Lucia
- 29 August 2000: Brazil
- 10 March 2001: Croatia
- 26 March 2001: Micronesia
- 11 May 2001: Latvia and Lithuania
- 7 October 2001: Estonia
- 26 August 2003: Macau
- 3 October 2005: Singapore
- 15 July 2007: Bulgaria
- 1 March 2008: Romania
- 6 April 2008: Honduras
- 27 July 2008: Albania
- 25 August 2008: North Macedonia
- 20 September 2008: Russia
- 28 September 2010: Nauru
- 28 September 2010: Montenegro
- 28 September 2010: Serbia
- 9 February 2011: Ukraine
- 10 August 2011: Taiwan
- 27 November 2011: Belize
- 11 December 2012: Palau
- 18 April 2014: Georgia
- 11 December 2014: Moldova
- 26 November 2015: Belarus
- 8 September 2016: Botswana
- 24 January 2017: Papua New Guinea
- 29 January 2017: Solomon Islands
- April 2017: Tonga
- 2020: Marshall Islands
- 1 July 2021: United Arab Emirates
- 6 July 2023: Samoa
- 5 May 2025: Kosovo

Cancelled:

- Unknown: Central African Republic, Nicaragua
- 30 August 2014: Bolivia (was applied from August 1972)
- 2 May 2025: Colombia (was resumed in 2026)

=== Partial exemptions ===
- – Nationals of Egypt do not need a visa for up to 14 days if entering through Taba and visiting up to Beersheba only.
- – Nationals of Turkey need a visa, but may apply for a tourist visa free of charge at any Israeli diplomatic mission.

=== Non-ordinary passports ===
Visa policy of Israel for holders of non-ordinary passports Israel Visa not required for holders of diplomatic and service passports Visa not required for holders of diplomatic passports

Holders of diplomatic and service passports of all visa-exempt countries (listed above) may enter Israel without a visa, except those of Australia, Belarus, Dominica, Russia, Saint Kitts and Nevis, Taiwan, United States, and holders of service passports of South Africa.

In addition, holders of diplomatic and service passports of Azerbaijan, Bahrain, Bosnia and Herzegovina, Burkina Faso, China, Gabon, Gambia, Guyana, India, Ivory Coast, Kazakhstan, Madagascar, Morocco, Nicaragua, Republic of the Congo, Sierra Leone, Thailand, Togo, Turkey, Vatican City, and holders of diplomatic passports of Armenia, Kenya, Liberia, Nepal, Rwanda, and Vietnam may enter Israel without a visa.

Holders of diplomatic and service passports do not need an ETA-IL.

- European Union member states ^{D S}
- Albania^{D S}
- Andorra^{D S}
- Argentina^{D S}
- Armenia^{D}
- Azerbaijan^{D S}
- Bahamas^{D S}
- Bahrain^{D S}
- Barbados^{D S}
- Belize^{D S}
- Botswana^{D S}
- Bosnia and Herzegovina^{D S}
- Burkina Faso^{D S}
- Brazil^{D S}
- Canada^{D S}
- China^{D S}
- Chile^{D S}
- Colombia^{D S}
- Costa Rica^{D S}
- Dominican Republic^{D S}
- Ecuador^{D S}
- El Salvador^{D S}
- Eswatini^{D S}
- Fiji^{D S}
- Gabon^{D S}
- Gambia^{D S}
- Georgia^{D S}
- Grenada^{D S}
- Guatemala^{D S}
- Guyana^{D S}
- Haiti^{D S}
- Honduras^{D S}
- Hong Kong^{D S}
- Iceland^{D S}
- India^{D S}
- Ivory Coast^{D S}
- Jamaica^{D S}
- Japan^{D S}
- Kazakhstan^{D S}
- Kenya^{D}
- Kosovo^{D S}
- Lesotho^{D S}
- Liberia^{D}
- Liechtenstein^{D S}
- Macau^{D S}
- Madagascar^{D S}
- Malawi^{D S}
- Marshall Islands^{D S}
- Mauritius^{D S}
- Mexico^{D S}
- Micronesia^{D S}
- Moldova^{D S}
- Monaco^{D S}
- Mongolia^{D S}
- Montenegro^{D S}
- Morocco^{D S}
- Nauru^{D S}
- Nepal^{D}
- New Zealand^{D S}
- Nicaragua^{D S}
- North Macedonia^{D S}
- Norway^{D S}
- Palau^{D S}
- Panama^{D S}
- Papua New Guinea^{D S}
- Paraguay^{D S}
- Peru^{D S}
- Philippines^{D S}
- Rwanda^{D}
- Saint Lucia^{D S}
- Saint Vincent and the Grenadines^{D S}
- Samoa^{D S}
- San Marino^{D S}
- Serbia^{D S}
- Sierra Leone^{D S}
- Singapore^{D S}
- Solomon Islands^{D S}
- South Africa^{D}
- South Korea^{D S}
- Suriname^{D S}
- Switzerland^{D S}
- Thailand^{D S}
- Togo^{D S}
- Tonga^{D S}
- Turkey^{D S}
- Trinidad and Tobago^{D S}
- Tuvalu^{D S}
- Ukraine^{D S}
- United Arab Emirates^{D S}
- United Kingdom^{D S}
- Uruguay^{D S}
- Vanuatu^{D S}
- Vatican City^{D S}
- Vietnam^{D}

_{D - Diplomatic passports}
_{S - Service passports}

=== Future changes ===
Israel has signed visa exemption agreements with the following countries, but they have not yet entered into force:

Country	Passports	Agreement signed on
Seychelles	All	11 January 2024

=== Proposed exemptions ===
- Kazakhstan – On 19 August 2024, Israel and Kazakhstan discussed the possibility of establishing a visa exemption agreement.

== Electronic visa (e-Visa) ==
Nationals of the following countries may apply online for an electronic visa (e-Visa), valid for up to 90 days for tourism, business, short study or medical treatment:

- India
- Sri Lanka

In 2025, the Israeli government planned to expand the e-Visa for nationals of more countries. In February 2025, Sri Lanka was also added to the list after India.

== Visa types ==
Category	Code	Title	Description	Fee
Temporary resident	A/1	Aliyah visa	For those eligible for immigration by the Law of Return (aliyah).	₪195 €52; US$54
Temporary resident	A/2	Student visa	For those who want to study in a recognized academic institution.	₪195 €52; US$54
Temporary resident	A/2	Yeshiva visa	For those who want to study in a yeshiva.	₪195 €52; US$54
Temporary resident	A/3	Clergy visa	For clergymen for the purpose of long-term fulfilling their clerical duties among their religious communities in Israel, pursuant to the invitation of a recognized religious institution in Israel.	₪195 €52; US$54
Temporary resident	A/4	Family of holders of A/2 and A/3 visas	For spouses and minor children of recipients of A/2 or A/3 visas.	₪195 €52; US$54
Temporary resident	A/5	Temporary resident visa	General temporary resident visa for any other reason that is not under A/1, A/2, A/3, or A/4 visas. Usually for partners of Israeli citizens or for humanitarian reasons.	₪195 €52; US$54
Work	B/1	Work visa	For those whose stay in Israel is approved for a limited period of time for the purpose of work.	₪195 €52; US$54
Work	B/1	Working holiday visa	For nationals of certain countries between the ages of 18 and 30 years.	₪195 €52; US$54
Visitor	B/2	ETA-IL	Electronic Travel Authorization for nationals of visa-exempt countries for tourism, business or short study up to 90 days.	₪25
Visitor	B/2	e-Visa	Electronic visa for nationals of visa required countries for tourism, business, or short study up to 90 days.	₪100
Visitor	B/2	Visitor visa	For nationals of visa-required countries for tourism, business or study up to 90 days.	₪100 €26; US$27
Visitor	B/2	Visitor visa extension	Extension of visit for tourism, business or study.	₪195
Doubtful status	B/3	Doubtful status visa	For those whose entry status is not clear. Valid for one month, during which the applicant may reclassify the entry status.	₪100 €26; US$27
Volunteer	B/4	Volunteer visa	For volunteers in a recognized organization, institute or settlement.: Organizations engaged in welfare or health; Religious institutes; Kibbutz (kibbutz volunteer); Moshav; Philanthropic institutes; Israel Defense Forces	₪100 €26; US$27
Foreign Investor	B/5	Foreign Investor visa	The Israeli investor visa is in reciprocity to the United States E-1 and E-2 visas for nationals of the United States, which allows the visa holders and their family members to live and work temporarily in Israel.	US$222 €213

=== Student visa ===
Student visa is categorized as A/2 visa and as multiple entry visa. Student visa is valid to one year with extension possibility. The visa is valid for one of the recognized academic institutions in Israel. Student with A/2 visa in general aren't allowed to work in Israel, but with some exceptions to students who work in the academic field or as part of the program, which are usually PhD students and in some cases also MA students.

From 3,237 PhD students in Israel 2023, 1,824 where foreign PhD students and almost half of the foreign PhD students in Israel are Indians.

Foreign PhD students in Israel 2023
#	Country of origin	Percentage		University	Percentage	University	Foreigners	Israelis	Total
1.	India	48.4%	1.	Hebrew University of Jerusalem (HUJI)	23.5%	(HUJI)	50.2%	49.8%	100%
2.	China	8.7%	2.	Weizmann Institute of Science (WIS)	18.9%	(WIS)	68.4	31.6%	100%
3.	Germany	5.7%	3.	Ben-Gurion University of the Negev (BGU)	15.1%	(BGU)	50.0%	50.0%	100%
4.	United States	5.2%	4.	Technion - Israel Institute of Technology (IIT)	12.7%	(IIT)	69.3%	30.7%	100%
5.	Italy	4.9%	5.	Tel Aviv University (TAU)	12.5%	(TAU)	60.0%	40.0%	100%
6.	Russia	3.5%	6.	Bar-Ilan University (BIU)	8.4%	(BIU)	44.3%	55.7%	100%
7.	France	3.3%	7.	University of Haifa (HU)	6.1%	(HU)	32.6%	67.4%	100%
8.	Spain	2.0%	8.	Ariel University (AU)	2.8%	(AU)	76.9%	23.1%	100%
9.	Brazil	1.9%		Total	100%				
10.	Other countries	16.4							
	Total	100%							

=== Work visa ===
Work visa is categorized as B/1 and can be given by different ways. B/1 is given differently, depending on the sector, Expert foreign workers, Foreign workers in the nursing care sector (Caregiver), or Foreign workers in the agriculture and construction sectors, and other types.

Foreign workers B/1 in Israel 2023
#	Country of origin	Num.
1.	India	18,927
2.	Philippines	17,634
3.	Thailand	17,174
4.	China	16,263
5.	Moldova	12,342
6.	Uzbekistan	11,285
7.	Sri Lanka	4,033
8.	Ukraine	2,718
9.	Nepal	1,733
10.	Turkey	941
11.	Georgia	890
12.	Malawi	664
13.	Colombia	490
14.	United States	440
15.	Romania	340
16.	Russia	277
17.	United Kingdom	208
18.	Germany	157
19.	France	109
20.	Brazil	60
	Other Countries	1,672
	Total	108,357

==== Foreign High-Tech Experts Incentive Program visa ====
A special program provides work visas for nationals of countries that are exempt from the visitor visa requirement who are hired by an Israeli high-tech company with a salary at least double the average wage in Israel. Nationals of Ukraine are exempt from minimum salary requirement.

==== Working holiday visa ====
Nationals of the following countries between the ages of 18 and 30 years may apply for a working holiday visa for 12 months in Israel.

- Australia
- Austria
- Czech Republic
- Germany
- Japan
- New Zealand
- South Korea
- Taiwan

=== Tourist group visa ===
Israeli licensed travel agents may apply for visas for groups of 10 to 50 tourists (5 to 50 if nationals of China, Indonesia or Malaysia). The agents must check the tourists' background, apply at least 10 days before their arrival (30 days for nationals of Egypt, Indonesia, Jordan, Malaysia, Mali, Mauritania, Morocco, South Sudan or Tunisia; or 3 months for nationals of Eritrea, considered in exceptional circumstances), provide their itinerary, pay a fee of ₪95 per group plus ₪35 per tourist, and deposit a bank guarantee of ₪100,000 (₪200,000 for nationals of Armenia, Congo, Ethiopia, Ghana, Ivory Coast, Nigeria, Sierra Leone, Sri Lanka, Turkey, Uganda or Uzbekistan).

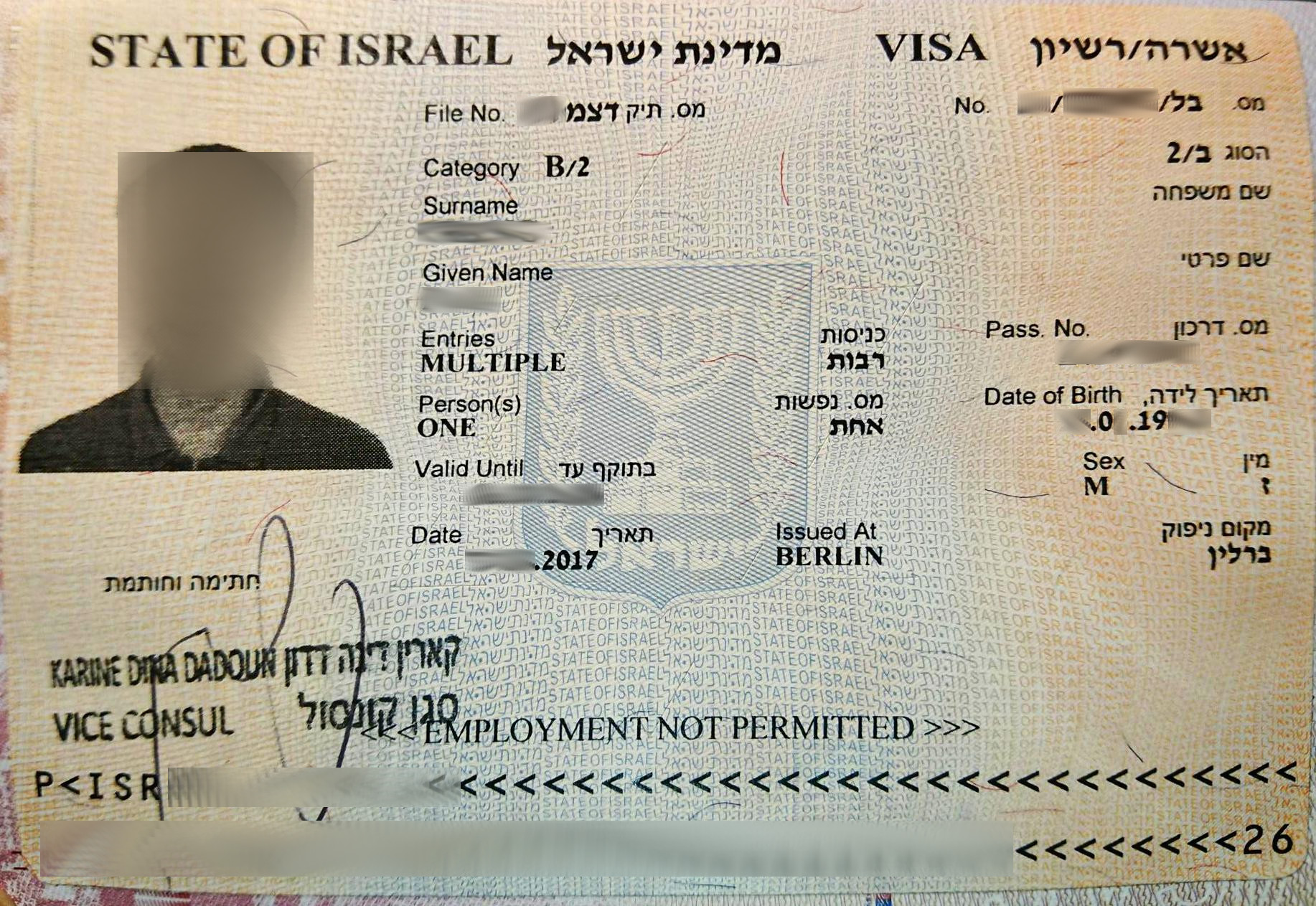
Israeli visa

== Israeli passport stamps ==
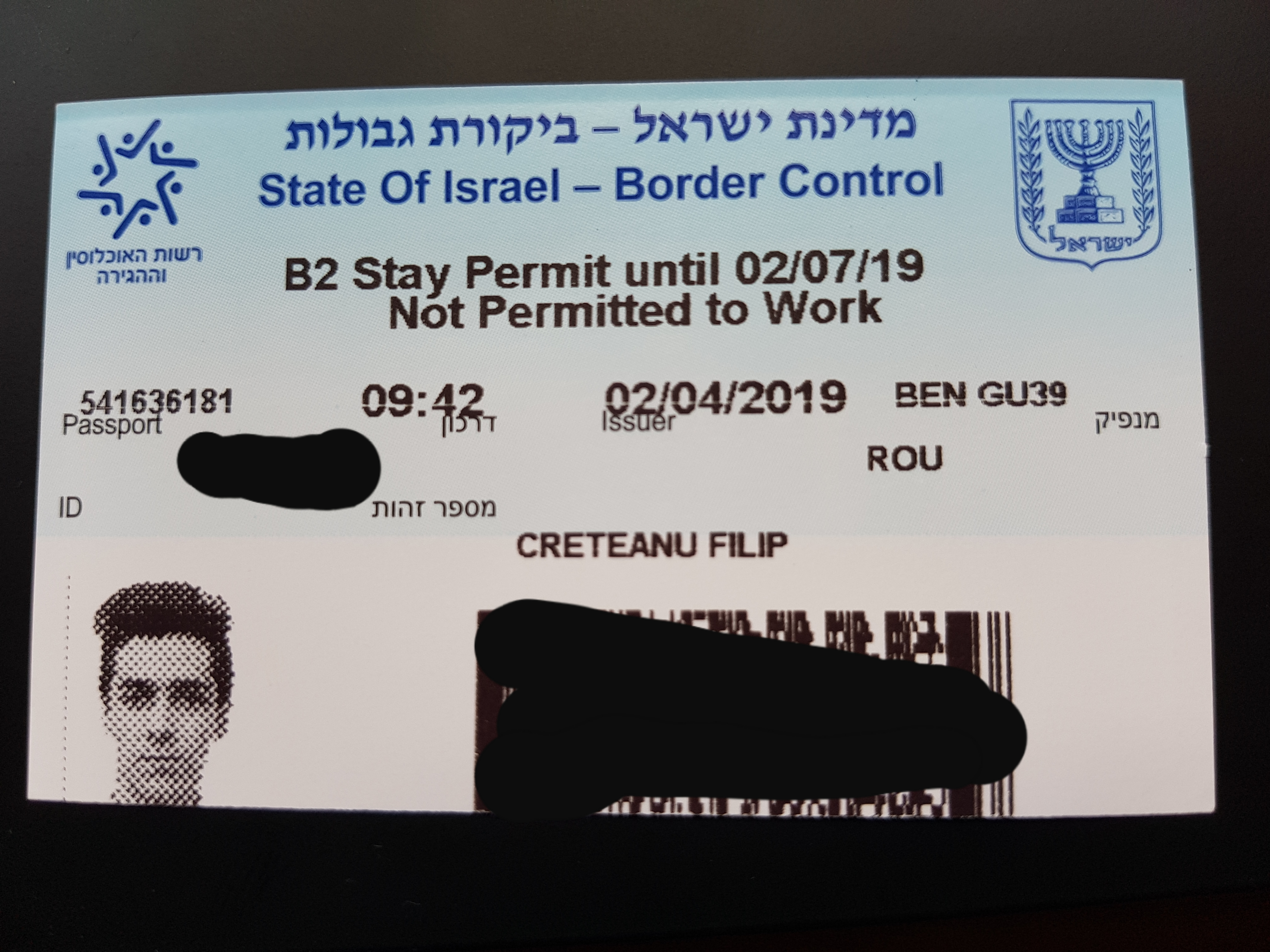
Entry card as replacement for passport stamp

Visitors with an Israeli passport stamp are not allowed to enter a number of countries because of the Arab League boycott of Israel. Some countries, such as Austria, Canada, Germany, Russia, United Kingdom and United States, allow their nationals to hold two or more passports of their country to circumvent such travel restrictions, but some of these countries also restrict or forbid the holding of passports of more than one country (multiple citizenship).

However, since 15 January 2013, Israel no longer stamps passports at airports and land border crossings with Jordan. Instead, the entry or departure record is printed on a small paper card, called an electronic gate pass, which includes the traveler's passport data, date, visa status, and other details. The card also includes a barcode which is used to pass through the gate out of the passport control hall.

== Accepted travel documents ==
Israel accepts passports of all member states and observer states of the United Nations (including their territories), Kosovo, Somaliland and Taiwan. Passports of Abkhazia, Northern Cyprus, South Ossetia, Transnistria and Western Sahara are not accepted.

Visitors without an accepted passport must obtain a laissez-passer with a visa from an Israeli diplomatic mission.

The Haudenosaunee passport is a travel document with limited recognition issued by the Iroquois nation in Canada and the United States. For the 2018 World Lacrosse Championship, which was hosted by Israel, the Israeli government accepted the Haudenosaunee passports of the Iroquois team after communicating with the Canadian government.

== Points of entry ==
Israel's crossing points. Main crossing points are bold.

Name of crossing point	District	Type of entry point	Description	Statistics of crossings
Rosh Hanikra crossing point	Northern District	Land	Israel - Lebanon border Closed to the general public. Serving mostly UN personal. Crossing only with special permit.	
Quneitra crossing point	Northern District	Land	Israel - Syrian border Closed to the general public. Serving mostly UN personal. Crossing only with special permit.	
Fishing port at the Kishon (Ma'agan Shavit)	Haifa District	Sea	Serving arrivals by yachts	
Greater Haifa Port	Haifa District	Sea	International port	2019: visitors: na - Israelis: 89.1; 2022: visitors: na - Israelis: 130.6
Haifa Airport	Haifa District	Air	Mostly domestic airport with some international flights	
Hadera port (Israel Electric Corporation)	Haifa District	Sea	Commercial ships only	
Jordan River crossing point (Sheikh Hussein)	Northern District	Land	Israel - Jordan border crossing	2019: visitors: 75.0 - Israelis: 106.5; 2022: visitors: 23.9 - Israelis: 97.9
Allenby Bridge crossing point	Judea and Samaria District	Land	Israel - Jordan border crossing Serving residents/citizens/visitors of the Palestinian Authority.	
Ben Gurion Airport	Central District	Air	International airport and major point of entry	2019: visitors: 3,853.7 - Israelis: 8,262.6; 2022: visitors: 2,442.3 - Israelis: 7,472.5
Herzliya Marina	Tel Aviv District	Sea	Serving arrivals by yachts	
Tel Aviv Marina	Tel Aviv District	Sea	Serving arrivals by yachts	
Ashdod Port	Southern District	Sea	International port	2019: visitors: na - Israelis: 0.5; 2022: visitors: na - Israelis: 0.3
Ashkelon Marina	Southern District	Sea	Serving arrivals by yachts	
Ashkelon-Eilat pipeline	Southern District	Sea	Commercial ships only	
Erez crossing point	Southern District	Land	Israel - Gaza border Closed to the general public. Crossing only with special permit.	
Nitzana crossing point	Southern District	Land	Israel - Egypt border Closed to the general public. Commercial only	
Rabin (Arava) crossing point	Southern District	Land	Israel - Jordan border crossing	2019: visitors: 128.4 - Israelis: 76.7; 2022: visitors: 38.7 - Israelis: 89.7
Ramon Airport	Southern District	Air	Mostly domestic airport with some international flights	2019: visitors: 113.3 - Israelis: na 2022: visitors: 6.4 - Israelis: na
Eilat Port	Southern District	Sea	International port	
Taba border crossing point	Southern District	Land	Israel - Egypt border crossing	2019: visitors: 93.3 - Israelis: 499.4; 2022: visitors: 39.2 - Israelis: 565.6

== West Bank and Gaza Strip ==
Foreign nationals who may travel to Israel without a visa or who hold an Israeli visa may also enter the West Bank on the same basis. Foreign nationals may also apply for an entry permit valid only for the West Bank. All foreign nationals need a permit to enter the Gaza Strip.

Israeli citizens may enter West Bank Areas B and C, but not West Bank Area A or the Gaza Strip, without a permit.

Palestinians registered in the West Bank need a permit to enter Israel or the Gaza Strip, and Palestinians registered in the Gaza Strip need a permit to enter Israel or the West Bank. Palestinian men over age 55 and women over age 50 registered in the West Bank, without a security restriction, receive an automatic permit to enter Israel for up to 6 months. Palestinians who receive a permit to depart from an Israeli airport may also return in the same way.

== Validity for other countries ==
Israeli visas or residency permits can be valid as substitute visas for the following countries:

- Georgia – Holders of valid Israeli visas or residency permits may enter Georgia without an additional visa for 90 days every 180 days with the requirement to show evidence of a valid Israeli visa or residency permit.

== History ==
In 1952, the Knesset passed the law "The entry law to Israel" which describes the first official entry policy of Israel. The law permits four types of visas for foreigners, transit visa (5 days), visit visa (3 months), temporary resident visa (3 years), and permanent visa. During the 50s' discussions on visa free took place as in 1955 the Israeli government decided to exempt visa fees from visitors from United States, Sweden, Denmark, Belgium, and Luxemburg to boost the early tourism sector.

Visa-exempt countries in 1966:

Ordinary passports: Uruguay, Iceland, Argentina, USA, Brazil, Denmark, Switzerland, UK, Liechtenstein, Norway, Finland, Chile, France, Canada, Australia, New Zealand, Belgium, The Netherlands, and Luxemburg. Diplomatic and service passports: Austria, Italy, El Salvador, Belgium, Dahomey, The Netherlands, Switzerland, The Philippines, Brazil, Gabon, Ivory Coast, Tanganyika, Luxemburg, Liberia, Niger, France, Colombia, Costa Rica, Thailand, Togo, Honduras, Sierra Leone, and Congo Leopoldville.

In 1967, Israel started to consider the visa exemption of German diplomatic and service passports as Germany promised not to allow Germans with Nazi backgrounds to use the visa exemption. In the same year Israel also exempted German passport from visa. Israel signed visa exemption agreement for ordinary passports with the United Kingdom, Lichtenstein, and Switzerland in 1967. For the international tourism year of 1967 Israel called in the UN to other countries to extend their visa exemptions for tourist to boost tourism and the share of cultures.

== Visitor statistics ==
Most visitors arriving in Israel were from the following countries of nationality:

Tourist arrivals, by country of citizenship (in thousands) since 2020
Country	2025	2024	2023	2022	2021	2020
United States	447.1	330.5	920.1	810.5	149.1	200.5
France	176.1	129.9	237.9	235.5	41.5	56.0
United Kingdom	104.1	79.6	195.8	177.9	32.4	44.1
Russia	68.2	70.4	176.1	162.9	14.4	56.0
Ukraine	32.5	31.2	63.6	71.5	14.1	24.6
Germany	42.9	25.5	167.4	151.1	16.5	50.3
Canada	31.1	21.8	75.3	62.1	10.0	15.6
Italy	23.7	16.3	115.6	82.7	7.0	25.1
Indonesia	11.7	13.2	24.4	15.0	0.0	12.2
Belgium	16.2	12.9	32.7	12.3	2.1	4.4
Switzerland	15.5	12.6	35.4	33.2	7.0	9.6
Brazil	20.3	12.1	65.3	64.8	2.3	13.5
Romania	28.2	11.9	95.3	50.3	2.0	24.8
South Africa	13.4	10.7	22.7	19.9	1.5	3.1
Spain	16.0	10.2	82.3	53.8	5.3	16.3
India	13.8	9.8	42.1	30.8	3.6	8.0
Australia	14.2	9.6	40.4	27.1	1.6	6.3
Greece	10.8	9.5	38.3	24.8	3.7	10.2
Netherlands	13.2	9.4	49.3	42.3	5.5	15.3
Argentina	12.3	7.6	29.4	24.6	2.3	8.6
Mexico	12.8	7.6	47.0	35.7	2.4	6.4
Jordan	7.5	7.2	17.0	16.6	5.0	3.1
Poland	10.4	6.5	90.3	41.0	2.3	45.2
Austria	8.9	6.3	25.7	23.5	4.2	10.0
Philippines	5.8	5.6	26.4	20.9	1.7	5.9
Belarus	6.1	5.2	14.2	30.4	7.3	9.1
Cyprus	5.4	4.5	18.8	11.0	1.0	2.4
China	7.7	4.2	23.2	6.6	1.7	11.4
Georgia	4.7	4.1	9.0	6.7	1.1	1.9
Moldova	3.3	3.7	7.7	9.0	3.7	1.9
Hungary	6.3	3.6	23.1	16.1	1.4	9.4
Turkey	5.8	3.5	26.3	20.4	1.7	7.3
Portugal	5.5	3.4	17.3	13.6	1.2	3.2
Colombia	3.5	3.3	14.9	15.1	1.2	2.6
Bulgaria	6.8	3.2	20.5	9.6	0.7	3.2
South Korea	5.5	3.0	38.0	12.7	0.8	17.1
Czech Republic	6.2	2.9	31.1	20.3	3.1	8.2
Thailand	1.5	2.7	2.5	1.6	0.4	0.8
Sweden	4.1	2.5	15.4	15.5	1.4	4.4
Ethiopia	-	2.4	4.6	2.6	0.6	1.8
Singapore	5.1	2.3	8.4	7.0	0.4	0.9
Lithuania	4.1	2.3	12.4	6.9	0.8	7.9
Denmark	3.0	1.8	12.4	13.7	1.3	3.9
Japan	2.5	1.7	10.6	6.1	0.8	3.5
Nigeria	8.0	1.6	9.8	6.7	0.3	3.1
Chile	2.3	1.5	9.0	6.7	0.6	2.9
Ireland	2.1	1.4	9.7	8.2	0.8	2.0
Norway	2.1	1.4	8.7	8.9	0.8	1.9
Finland	1.9	1.3	8.9	7.4	0.7	3.2
Malaysia	1.2	1.3	4.9	2.5	0.0	1.5
Azerbaijan	-	1.2	2.3	2.2	0.6	0.7
Kazakhstan	1.5	1.2	3.3	2.8	0.9	0.9
Serbia	3.5	1.2	8.0	6.1	0.6	2.2
Uzbekistan	1.4	1.2	2.3	2.3	2.0	0.8
Ecuador	-	1.1	6.5	2.9	0.5	0.7
Slovakia	1.8	1.1	17.5	8.6	0.7	4.7
Taiwan	1.4	1.0	6.9	2.1	0.2	3.4
Peru	-	1.0	7.3	5.7	0.5	1.8
Ghana	-	0.9	1.2	1.7	-	-
Kenya	0.9	0.9	2.2	1.8	0.3	0.3
Latvia	1.7	0.9	5.2	4.3	0.6	2.6
Morocco	1.2	0.9	3.2	2.9	0.5	0.8
Uruguay	1.4	0.9	3.5	5.6	0.3	0.9
Egypt	0.8	0.8	5.4	5.0	0.5	0.6
Panama	-	0.8	2.9	2.6	0.4	0.8
Croatia	1.5	0.6	6.8	3.9	0.4	2.1
Guatemala	-	0.6	3.3	2.8	0.2	0.4
New Zealand	0.9	0.6	4.8	2.4	0.1	0.6
Tunisia	-	0.6	0.7	0.8	-	-
Costa Rica	-	0.5	4.1	3.1	0.5	0.6
Estonia	0.8	0.5	2.5	2.2	0.2	1.3
Armenia	0.3	2.0	2.0	-	-	
Slovenia	0.5	0.3	3.4	2.1	0.2	0.9
Tanzania	-	0.3	0.9	1.2	-	-
Honduras	-	0.2	2.3	1.6	-	-
Vietnam	-	0.2	3.2	2.3	0.4	0.6
Dominican Republic	-	0.1	1.5	1.7	-	-
Paraguay	-	0.1	0.9	0.8	-	-
Luxemburg	-	0.0	0.9	1.1	-	-
United Arab Emirates	0.0	-	0.1	0.1	-	-
Malta	0.0	1.9	1.4	-	-	
Ivory Coast	0.0	1.7	1.6	-	-	
El Salvador	0.0	1.8	1.5	-	-	
Albania	0.0	1.4	1.3	-	-	
Mauritius	0.0	1.4	0.7	-	-	
Uganda	0.0	1.3	0.7	-	-	
North Macedonia	0.0	1.9	1.3	-	-	
Hong Kong	0.0	2.9	1.0	0.0	1.2	
Montenegro	0.0	0.7	0.8	-	-	
Cambodia	0.0	0.5	0.4	-	-	
Zimbabwe	0.0	0.5	0.3	-	-	
Rwanda	0.0	0.5	0.7	-	-	
Nepal	0.0	0.4	0.4	-	-	
Bolivia	0.0	0.3	0.5	-	-	
Grand total	1,353.9	974.4	3,239.1	2,675.0	396.5	831.5

Tourist arrivals, by country of citizenship (in thousands) 2010–2020
Country	2020	2019	2018	2017	2016	2015	2014	2013	2012	2011	2010
United States	200.5	969.4	898.1	778.8	648.3	620.3	602.6	597.2	583.6	581.0	605.1
France	56.0	367.5	346.0	308.6	287.5	293.7	288.9	292.3	263.6	269.5	274.1
Russia	56.0	318.1	316.3	331.5	266.0	294.0	411.4	405.0	380.7	353.4	318.7
Germany	50.3	289.0	262.6	218.1	164.1	159.8	162.3	159.8	158.5	171.0	171.5
Poland	45.2	156.9	151.8	97.3	51.6	57.8	62.0	67.3	58.9	60.4	69.4
United Kingdom	44.1	235.4	218.0	198.5	181.3	174.6	164.6	173.3	165.1	168.0	168.8
Italy	25.1	190.7	150.6	107.8	82.2	84.4	111.2	127.7	126.2	113.3	150.2
Romania	24.8	121.1	106.9	78.9	48.8	43.2	43.1	34.6	39.6	37.8	38.5
Ukraine	24.6	135.4	137.4	146.3	131.9	112.7	110.7	108.0	109.2	106.8	55.3
South Korea	17.1	60.4	45.1	39.7	27.8	22.3	21.6	28.1	28.6	28.0	30.0
Spain	16.3	104.7	77.7	62.4	44.5	42.2	45.3	47.9	50.1	51.0	59.7
Canada	15.6	95.8	91.9	80.5	64.5	63.5	62.6	65.3	65.0	64.4	70.2
Netherlands	15.3	91.0	83.1	64.1	50.2	47.7	50.2	52.0	62.0	58.7	53.4
Brazil	13.5	82.1	62.7	55.0	34.1	42.3	50.1	54.0	56.6	53.1	48.8
Indonesia	12.2	38.7	35.3	36.2	22.8	22.0	26.6	29.5	27.8	21.9	17.7
China	11.4	142.8	104.5	113.2	79.2	51.3	37.7	29.8	23.6	20.1	17.0
Greece	10.2	41.9	29.7	27.9	17.7	15.7	16.3	18.0	20.4	19.0	24.2
Austria	10.0	49.4	38.6	29.0	24.0	22.9	27.9	26.9	27.9	27.7	28.1
Switzerland	9.6	63.5	57.0	48.8	41.3	38.1	37.5	38.4	37.1	36.3	32.1
Hungary	9.4	39.1	31.1	22.4	16.5	16.4	16.4	14.6	9.3	11.4	11.8
Belarus	9.1	44.6	40.7	36.3	33.1	15.9	16.1	15.1	14.2	11.8	11.4
Argentina	8.6	34.7	34.8	31.4	25.4	24.3	22.5	24.5	23.2	21.6	22.3
Czech Republic	8.2	32.4	31.7	24.3	15.9	14.2	16.8	15.0	13.8	13.0	13.7
India	8.0	65.1	70.5	58.2	44.6	39.3	34.6	39.0	43.0	38.5	40.1
Lithuania	7.9	23.3	19.2	17.9	12.9	10.6	10.1	6.5	5.6	5.1	5.1
Turkey	7.3	32.0	38.3	40.5	34.0	25.7	22.4	22.5	16.3	13.5	13.7
Mexico	6.4	50.2	36.6	28.4	20.7	22.4	20.7	21.4	21.5	18.7	22.7
Australia	6.3	48.8	43.1	39.9	29.4	28.7	30.3	32.5	30.1	28.9	30.7
Philippines	5.9	32.9	28.6	22.2	14.2	11.1	10.2	11.3	12.2	9.4	10.2
Slovakia	4.7	22.7	20.1	14.4	8.7	8.7	10.4	8.4	10.1	10.2	11.6
Sweden	4.4	33.4	33.4	27.3	21.3	23.9	25.1	24.5	22.2	20.7	20.2
Belgium	4.4	27.2	27.3	27.3	22.4	32.6	32.3	32.5	31.3	31.8	31.2
Denmark	3.9	23.6	22.5	19.2	18.4	19.6	22.6	19.2	18.6	18.9	15.2
Japan	3.5	26.1	19.6	17.1	11.9	10.0	13.0	13.5	16.0	13.4	13.2
Taiwan	3.4	16.0	12.5	9.6	6.4	5.6	6.0	5.3	5.0	4.5	3.9
Bulgaria	3.2	19.8	16.4	11.8	8.4	8.7	8.5	6.7	7.1	7.5	7.2
Portugal	3.2	18.8	13.2	10.9	8.6	8.3	7.6	8.8	8.4	8.5	13.6
Finland	3.2	18.7	17.2	15.3	13.9	12.7	15.7	18.7	17.5	18.3	19.5
South Africa	3.1	29.5	27.4	25.8	20.8	19.9	20.0	23.5	24.0	22.1	21.1
Jordan	3.1	19.2	18.1	14.4	18.9	21.4	17.3	17.9	23.4	20.3	17.8
Nigeria	3.1	12.7	10.0	9.0	8.4	16.3	20.5	24.6	29.4	45.0	31.6
Chile	2.9	11.9	9.1	7.4	5.4	5.6	5.6	6.0	5.5	5.7	5.8
Colombia	2.6	19.2	16.0	11.9	8.5	8.0	8.6	10.6	11.0	9.5	10.9
Latvia	2.6	12.9	14.2	13.2	8.1	5.8	5.6	5.4	5.6	5.4	4.7
Cyprus	2.4	10.9	8.4	8.2	5.5	5.3	5.9	6.8	9.2	10.2	10.4
Serbia	2.2	10.5	8.1	6.4	4.6	4.7	5.0	4.0	3.7	4.1	3.0
Croatia	2.1	10.1	7.3	6.3	4.4	3.4	4.8	4.6	5.3	5.1	6.1
Ireland	2.0	12.8	11.3	9.9	10.3	8.1	8.1	8.1	7.6	8.9	9.1
Norway	1.9	17.9	16.1	13.7	11.8	14.0	15.0	16.4	15.5	16.0	14.2
Moldova	1.9	10.7	11.0	10.8	8.7	7.6	3.7	3.6	4.0	3.6	4.4
Georgia	1.9	8.3	9.3	11.4	14.2	10.1	0.8	4.1	4.3	4.3	4.5
Peru	1.8	8.4	6.8	5.5	3.9	3.8	..	..	..	..	..
Ethiopia	1.8	6.8	5.1	5.7	4.8	4.7	3.1	2.9	2.8	4.4	3.2
Malaysia	1.5	14.7	13.7	10.3	7.4	5.5	8.7	9.2	6.5	2.9	1.6
Estonia	1.3	6.1	5.3	5.0	2.9	2.8	3.4	2.5	3.3	3.6	5.3
Hong Kong	1.2	12.8	9.5	9.1	5.3	4.3	5.3	4.8	4.2	3.3	4.1
Singapore	0.9	15.9	14.0	12.8	11.3	9.7	10.4	10.6	10.2	8.3	8.7
Uruguay	0.9	5.9	4.7	3.7	2.5	2.9	2.7	2.6	2.5	2.6	2.6
Kazakhstan	0.9	5.5	5.9	8.6	5.7	7.7	8.1	9.4	10.9	9.6	6.5
Slovenia	0.9	4.5	3.4	2.8	1.8	2.0	2.1	2.2	2.2	2.0	2.6
Thailand	0.8	3.9	3.4	2.8	2.4	2.3	3.1	3.8	4.3	3.2	3.0
Morocco	0.8	3.5	3.0	2.9	2.9	3.2	3.1	2.5	2.3	2.4	2.5
Uzbekistan	0.8	3.4	3.8	3.8	3.8	3.6	3.2	3.4	3.8	3.5	3.4
Panama	0.8	3.3	3.1	2.8	2.5	2.5	..	..	..	..	..
Ecuador	0.7	4.8	3.8	3.6	3.0	2.6	2.2	2.8	3.1	3.4	3.5
Azerbaijan	0.7	3.2	3.0	3.1	2.9	3.0	2.8	3.0	3.1	2.9	2.9
Egypt	0.6	8.0	6.3	7.0	8.7	6.1	5.2	4.1	3.8	2.4	2.6
New Zealand	0.6	7.0	6.1	4.9	3.5	3.5	3.7	3.7	3.6	3.4	3.9
Vietnam	0.6	4.6	4.7	3.1	2.5	1.9	..	..	..	..	..
Costa Rica	0.6	3.9	3.5	3.3	2.6	2.1	..	..	..	..	..
Guatemala	0.4	4.0	3.7	2.6	2.1	1.6	..	..	..	..	..
Kenya	0.3	4.2	4.7	3.8	4.1	3.4	3.5	2.5	2.3	2.7	2.4
Grand total	831.5	4,551.6	4,120.9	3,613.2	2,900.0	2,799.4	2,926.4	2,961.7	2,885.8	2,820.2	2,803.1

Tourist arrivals, by country of citizenship (in thousands) 2000–2010
Country	2010	2009	2008	2007	2006	2005	2004	2003	2002	2001	2000
United States	605.1	538.0	600.6	532.4	494.0	457.5	379.1	271.9	206.1	266.2	488.5
Russia	318.7	231.4	205.4	133.3	73.6	68.0	55.7	41.3	36.9	55.8	74.6
France	274.1	254.0	256.3	242.1	252.2	311.4	257.5	174.4	117.9	129.3	202.4
Germany	171.5	139.8	137.4	98.7	89.6	105.2	75.9	49.0	38.8	65.5	176.0
United Kingdom	168.8	163.5	173.3	160.1	161.2	156.7	146.5	104.2	97.3	140.2	201.2
Italy	150.2	116.5	120.6	79.4	58.1	72.9	42.0	26.0	16.9	25.0	171.4
Canada	70.2	59.5	68.5	58.0	51.4	50.8	43.6	31.3	25.1	34.2	55.0
Spain	69.4	53.8	86.8	51.9	30.7	51.9	21.4	15.9	8.6	11.8	65.6
Slovakia	59.7	49.0	61.0	45.4	5.0	7.1	6.9	1.8	1.9	3.8	7.9
Ukraine	55.3	46.5	63.9	49.9	30.7	28.3	24.2	19.3	18.4	33.5	38.0
Netherlands	53.4	44.5	48.3	40.3	43.0	49.8	40.4	27.3	22.8	43.3	91.3
Brazil	48.8	27.9	31.2	20.1	15.5	19.8	11.4	7.8	5.4	8.7	25.3
India	40.1	23.1	29.5	24.2	20.4	19.0	12.7	8.4	9.3	12.0	15.9
Romania	38.5	28.9	37.4	19.2	11.4	9.6	7.9	6.7	5.9	9.6	11.9
Switzerland	32.1	26.6	27.0	23.3	22.8	25.6	22.6	17.0	13.9	19.6	32.8
Nigeria	31.6	43.9	34.3	31.2	24.6	10.7	16.8	11.8	12.9	8.5	9.3
Belgium	31.2	23.7	23.1	20.8	24.5	25.5	22.8	17.8	15.4	21.6	39.9
Australia	30.7	23.5	26.3	20.9	18.2	19.7	14.9	9.9	8.2	10.4	23.4
South Korea	30.0	17.3	30.6	29.4	28.0	25.9	18.5	8.2	8.1	11.2	16.8
Austria	28.1	23.6	23.7	17.0	15.3	13.3	11.1	8.3	7.6	9.6	22.0
Greece	24.2	18.4	28.8	20.8	16.7	15.0	10.0	6.1	4.8	7.8	24.4
Mexico	22.7	15.0	22.2	18.1	13.3	24.0	14.7	8.2	4.2	9.5	37.9
Argentina	22.3	16.0	19.6	15.0	11.8	14.8	11.7	10.0	7.3	10.6	22.7
South Africa	21.1	18.1	22.4	18.8	16.6	16.5	12.6	9.8	9.1	13.4	20.6
Sweden	20.2	17.0	16.7	14.0	16.8	18.3	12.6	8.6	6.7	10.8	37.0
Finland	19.5	17.8	12.3	8.7	7.8	7.6	6.5	4.1	3.6	11.2	25.7
Jordan	17.8	15.0	15.3	10.5	15.1	8.3	22.9	18.4	24.5	24.6	77.9
Indonesia	17.7	9.6	14.4	11.4	7.3	8.4	5.6	2.7	1.1	3.5	9.8
Denmark	15.2	12.7	12.2	11.2	10.5	11.8	8.7	6.9	6.1	9.5	24.1
Norway	14.2	12.1	13.4	9.8	9.2	9.2	6.7	4.3	4.1	6.4	13.8
Turkey	13.7	13.4	16.3	13.7	15.7	15.7	13.8	13.1	12.0	15.1	23.5
Czech Republic	13.7	10.9	16.4	9.6	14.4	10.0	5.5	3.1	3.2	5.5	11.4
Poland	13.6	6.9	11.6	5.0	42.1	26.8	10.3	6.1	5.3	13.1	41.9
Japan	13.2	9.8	14.4	10.6	9.4	8.3	6.2	4.8	4.1	7.1	18.1
China	12.9	7.6	8.9	7.7	5.8	4.0	3.0	1.9	2.6	6.3	9.8
Hungary	11.8	9.4	13.8	10.0	7.6	8.7	6.9	5.2	5.1	8.1	14.3
Portugal	11.6	8.1	8.9	5.4	3.4	7.8	3.2	1.5	1.3	2.0	18.8
Belarus	11.4	9.7	11.8	9.0	5.9	5.6	4.5	4.2	4.0	6.1	6.2
Colombia	10.9	7.9	9.0	7.1	5.1	8.9	6.3	4.1	3.2	5.3	13.0
Cyprus	10.4	9.4	11.9	9.3	7.7	7.6	5.9	4.5	3.8	4.7	10.3
Philippines	10.2	7.3	9.0	6.7	4.6	5.6	4.3	4.6	5.1	7.1	14.4
Ireland	9.1	7.5	9.0	7.3	5.7	7.0	4.2	2.8	2.5	4.3	9.7
Singapore	8.7	6.5	8.5	7.3	5.2	5.8	5.8	2.8	1.7	1.8	3.6
Bulgaria	7.2	6.1	8.6	5.2	3.5	3.1	2.7	2.1	2.5	2.7	4.0
Kazakhstan	6.5	4.5	6.1	4.9	..	..	..	..	..	..	..
Croatia	6.1	5.3	5.2	3.3	2.9	2.4	..	..	..	..	..
Chile	5.8	4.2	5.5	3.3	2.8	5.1	3.6	2.4	1.5	2.5	9.3
Estonia	5.3	3.1	2.6	2.0	1.2	1.1	..	..	..	..	..
Lithuania	5.1	4.2	7.4	5.5	3.3	2.4	..	..	..	..	..
Latvia	4.7	4.2	5.9	5.2	4.3	3.0	2.2	1.6	1.7	2.7	4.2
Georgia	4.5	4.6	6.0	5.1	3.2	2.7	2.1	1.9	1.9	2.9	3.8
Moldova	4.4	3.1	4.4	3.4	2.3	2.4	1.9	1.6	1.5	3.0	4.0
Hong Kong	4.1	2.2	3.4	2.1	0.7	1.0	0.5	0.2	0.1	0.4	1.4
New Zealand	3.9	2.7	3.1	2.8	2.5	2.4	2.1	1.5	1.3	1.9	4.4
Taiwan	3.9	2.5	3.7	3.4	3.0	2.2	1.9	1.1	0.8	1.1	2.7
Ecuador	3.5	2.7	3.0	2.5	..	..	..	..	..	..	..
Uzbekistan	3.4	3.0	4.9	3.5	2.1	2.1	2.3	2.3	3.0	5.9	7.1
Thailand	3.0	3.4	2.7	2.8	1.9	1.5	1.3	1.8	1.5	0.6	2.4
Serbia	3.0	1.4	1.1	0.6	..	..	..	..	..	..	..
Azerbaijan	2.9	2.7	2.9	2.7	..	..	..	..	..	..	..
Venezuela	2.8	2.8	3.9	3.0	1.9	3.2	2.5	2.1	1.1	1.9	5.9
Uruguay	2.6	2.3	2.6	2.1	2.0	3.2	3.0	2.7	2.0	2.6	4.0
Egypt	2.6	2.3	1.7	2.5	4.8	4.3	3.1	2.8	3.1	5.3	12.8
Slovenia	2.6	2.2	2.4	1.5	..	..	..	..	..	..	..
Morocco	2.5	2.3	2.5	2.6	2.5	3.3	3.4	2.8	2.2	2.4	3.0
Malaysia	1.6	0.6	2.3	2.0	1.2	1.5	0.6	0.1	0.1	0.4	2.6
Lebanon	..	..	..	..	..	..	0.3	0.3	0.3	0.5	15.6
Grand total	2,803.1	2,321.4	2,559.6	2,063.1	1,825.2	1,902.8	1,505.5	1,063.2	861.9	1,195.7	2,416.8

Tourist arrivals, by country of citizenship (in thousands) 1990–2000
Country	2000	1999	1998	1997	1996	1995	1994	1993	1992	1991	1990
United States	488.5	515.2	451	420.7	435.1	452.7	385.1	371.9	345.4	227.2	244.5
France	202.4	194.9	168.6	166.7	173.1	178.4	159.2	152.6	140.3	111.7	118.4
United Kingdom	201.2	195.5	197.8	198.9	207.4	217.1	196	170.7	149.2	100.6	114
Germany	176	181	145.6	182.5	222	218.8	194.6	173.3	162.7	79.3	97.9
Italy	171.4	146.7	85.4	84.2	72.2	83	71.5	73.8	73.2	27.2	33.7
Netherlands	91.3	90.4	73.9	77.7	81.8	75.5	59	52.2	48.6	29.8	28.3
Jordan	77.9	59.8	52.9	46.9	49.8	84.4	25.8	25.1	19.7	8.5	7.1
Spain	65.6	35.1	22.7	19.8	20.9	32.6	26.7	24	22.8	9.9	16.4
Canada	55	51.4	43.6	43.5	44.4	46.5	38.2	38.4	37.4	24.7	30.8
Poland	41.9	25.9	16.4	14.8	14.3	15.1	11.9	13.7	12	5.7	6
Belgium	39.9	45.9	39.5	46.6	47.2	46.7	36.9	32.3	25.1	17.6	20.1
Ukraine	38	27.9	23.6	21.7	19.5	17.8	..	..	..	..	..
Mexico	37.9	14.6	10.2	10.2	8.7	7.4	9.6	9.6	10.5	4.4	5.9
Sweden	37	34.8	31.9	33.6	39.1	37.1	35.5	31.6	33.9	20.4	23
Russia	35.9	55.4	61.5	69.7	64.9	61.6	..	..	..	..	..
Switzerland	32.8	34.9	35.5	35.7	44	53.9	53.2	44.6	39.5	25.6	31.1
Finland	25.7	28	24.4	25.6	26.6	25.5	21.3	18.1	23.1	15.6	19.4
Brazil	25.3	17.3	24.5	27.9	26	28.2	16.2	12.8	11.3	7.8	10.5
Greece	24.4	19.8	14.8	12.3	10.8	21.8	16.7	18.5	19.1	10	8.6
Denmark	24.1	29	24.1	29.9	28.8	26.4	20.9	17.4	16.7	9.7	10.9
Turkey	23.5	21.6	16.4	13.8	14.3	11.8	8.9	7.9	6.6	7	6.1
Australia	23.4	23.8	20	23.9	22.7	24.6	20.1	19.2	18.1	10.4	14.4
Argentina	22.7	16.7	16.2	16.5	16.1	17.8	18.1	17	16.6	9.6	8.6
Austria	22	31.3	26.2	31.5	38	40.4	37.3	33.5	29.5	11.4	17.2
South Africa	20.6	24.1	25.6	27.2	31.3	34.2	28.9	26.6	23.6	14.9	19.9
Czech Republic and Slovakia or as Czechoslovakia	19.3	26.6	2.7	20.5	18.3	14	8.6	5.6	5.4	3.3	1.8
Portugal	18.8	10	5.4	6.3	5.1	9.5	6.8	8.9	8.2	1.9	5.1
Japan	18.1	17.9	13.8	16.3	18.5	15.8	12.6	10.7	11.4	5.8	6.4
South Korea	16.8	12.2	5.3	23	28.5	19.7	13.1	9	8.3	4.5	3.5
India	15.9	14.8	10.9	13.2	11.6	8.4	7.4	5	3.4	2	3.7
Lebanon	15.6	39.1	34.1	32.4	33	38.6	38.8	36.4	32.9	25.1	41.8
Philippines	14.4	8.6	4.4	5.7	5.3	5.3	3.6	2.8	2.1	1.4	1.7
Hungary	14.3	15.9	11.8	13.3	14	14.6	14.1	12.2	10.5	6.4	8.5
Norway	13.8	13.8	13.7	15.8	18.3	18.2	14.7	12.5	11.5	7.5	8.7
Colombia	13	6.5	6.3	8.2	7.6	8.1	6.3	5.3	..	..	..
Egypt	12.8	11.7	12.3	13.9	22.3	28	21.8	9.8	8.1	6.1	3.3
Romania	11.9	10.4	6.6	5.9	6.8	8.5	8.8	8.1	5	7.9	10
Cyprus	10.3	9.6	9.7	8.7	8.4	10.2	9.6	7.3	7.7	6	4.5
China	9.8	7.6	5.2	4.4	3.7	4.3	3.4	2.4	..	..	..
Indonesia	9.8	9.2	1.8	11.5	9.2	8.1	3.6	..	..	..	..
Ireland	9.7	10.2	6.2	6.2	5.2	6	5.5	6.2	5.7	3.9	4.2
Chile	9.3	5.2	4	5.2	4.5	3.8	3.8	3	2.8	1.8	1.9
Nigeria	9.3	0.9	2.9	7	0.9	13.5	5.7	1.6	..	..	..
Croatia, Bosnia and Herzegovina, Serbia and Montenegro, Slovenia, and Republic of Macedonia or as Yugoslavia	9	5.7	4	3.5	4.5	3.7	3.6	3.6	4	3.8	5.4
Uzbekistan	7.1	4.5	3.3	4	5	5	..	..	..	..	..
Belarus	6.2	4.8	4.5	3.9	4.2	3.8	..	..	..	..	..
Venezuela	5.9	3.1	2.6	2.3	2.6	3.2	2.2	2.1	2.2	1.6	1.7
New Zealand	4.4	4.7	3.8	4.4	4.5	4.8	4.1	3.5	3.4	1.9	2.7
Latvia	4.2	4.6	4.1	4	3.7	3.5	..	..	..	..	..
Bulgaria	4	3.7	2.8	2.9	4.2	4.7	4.1	3.5	2.5	2.3	2.4
Moldova	4	2.9	2.7	3	4.2	2.5	..	..	..	..	..
Uruguay	4	2.7	2.6	2.3	2.6	2.8	2.6	2.5	2.2	1.5	1.8
Georgia	3.8	2.9	3	3.3	3.5	2.9	..	..	..	..	..
Singapore	3.6	4	3.2	4.3	4.8	4.7	3.6	2.5	..	..	..
Morocco	3	3.2	2.4	2.6	..	..	..	1.6	1.5	1.4	1.4
Taiwan	2.7	2.6	2.1	2.7	3	2.2	..	..	..	..	..
Malaysia	2.6	2.5	1.1	2.8	3.3	3.5	..	..	..	..	..
Thailand	2.4	2.5	1.4	3.6	2.8	3	4.2	2.5	..	..	..
Hong Kong	1.4	2.4	2.7	3.6	3.8	5	4.9	4.6	4	1.8	2.5
Armenia, Azerbaijan, Belarus, Estonia, Georgia, Kazakhstan, Kyrgyzstan, Latvia, Lithuania, Moldova, Russia, Tajikistan, Turkmenistan, Ukraine, and Uzbekistan or as Soviet Union	..	..	..	..	..	..	92.7	63.3	41.8	21.9	23.0
Luxembourg	..	..	..	..	..	..	..	..	..	0.4	0.4
Tunisia	..	..	..	..	..	..	..	..	..	0.4	0.4
Ethiopia	..	..	..	..	..	..	..	..	..	0.3	0.9
Pakistan	..	..	..	..	..	..	..	..	..	0.1	0.1
Grand total	2,416.8	2,312.3	1,941.6	2,010.4	2,100.6	2,215.6	1,838.70	1,655.60	1,509.50	943.3	1,063.4

Tourist arrivals, by country of citizenship (in thousands) 1980–1990
Country	1990	1989	1988	1987	1986	1985	1984	1983	1982	1981	1980
United States	244.5	260.2	250.1	293.5	211.7	367	403.8	354.4	263.5	270.9	284.7
France	118.4	131.9	124.8	153.8	1360	140.7	125.1	127.5	129.6	148.0	138.8
United Kingdom	114.1	134.6	145.6	155.6	133.9	129.3	131.3	122.4	126.8	143.2	140.8
West Germany	97.9	119.3	154.6	182.1	139.1	145.7	133.8	111.4	107.5	155.1	157.4
Lebanon	41.8	42.6	38.8	37.1	36.5	31.4	33.4	65.1	..	..	..
Italy	33.7	35.8	28.8	52.3	33.5	44.4	48.9	47.4	35.1	49.2	55.8
Switzerland	31.2	35.5	40.7	47.4	37.7	36.2	35.1	31.7	29.3	31.4	34.1
Canada	30.8	32.3	30.1	34.2	28.5	38.1	34.6	33.0	26.6	27.8	26.5
Netherlands	28.3	33.8	36.6	45.7	31.5	32.1	26.5	28.8	28.9	32.3	37.1
Sweden	23	30.4	33.3	35.4	24.9	24.9	23.2	17.9	..	..	..
Soviet Union	23	22.3	..	..	..	..	..	..	..	..	..
Belgium	20.1	22.4	20	24.3	20.7	19.7	18.3	17.0	15.7	20.2	20.9
South Africa	19.9	18.4	21	23.6	20.3	18	26.5	22.4	18.4	17.6	26.1
Finland	18.4	19.7	20	19.2	14.2	10.7	9	7.8	..	..	..
Austria	17.2	17.8	21.2	27.7	23.1	26	21.7	19.1	16.8	22.9	22.4
Spain	16.4	17.8	13.4	21.5	16.1	14.2	12.9	9.4	7.8	11.0	10.8
Australia	14.4	16.9	16.9	20	15.8	19.9	16.7	14.1	11.6	12.1	13.4
Denmark	10.9	14.8	16.9	18.7	15.6	16.6	14.1	11.6	..	..	..
Brazil	10.5	15.7	13.6	14.2	11.2	9.6	8.7	7.5	8.2	7.5	7.3
Romania	10	3.5	4.5	4	3.2	3	3.3	3.4	3.3	3.5	3.0
Norway	8.7	9.7	11.5	13.4	11.6	10.1	9	7.6	..	..	..
Argentina	8.6	10.3	10.5	14.4	28	14.5	12.5	10	7.4	13.5	15.4
Greece	8.6	9	7.6	12.7	10	9.9	12	9.1	11.2	10.8	11.1
Hungary	8.5	11	..	..	..	..	..	..	..	..	..
Jordan	7.1	5.7	4.4	18.7	17.6	14.5	13.1	12.3	..	..	..
Japan	6.4	6.9	7.5	7.2	5.1	4.7	4.4	4.3	3.9	3.3	3.4
Turkey	6.1	5.4	5.3	5.4	4.6	4.6	6	..	..	..	7.6
Poland	6	9.9	..	..	..	..	..	..	..	..	..
Mexico	5.9	7.9	9	10.2	6	12	11.9	8.2	6.3	12.6	9.4
Portugal	5.1	5	4	5.2	2.8	2.8	2.3	2.9	..	..	..
Cyprus	4.5	4.3	3.2	7.3	6.2	6	6.7	..	..	..	5.7
Ireland	4.2	4.7	5	7.3	5.7	5.4	5.5	5.7	..	..	..
India and Pakistan	3.8	4.3	4.5	5.3	..	..	..	..	..	..	..
Egypt	3.3	4.2	4.3	5.1	5.6	5	4.6	4.4	4.2	0.0	0.0
New Zealand	2.7	3.5	4.2	3.7	2.7	2.8	3	2.1	2.0	2.3	2.6
Chile	1.9	2.4	1.9	1.7	1.5	2	1.7	1.4	1.8	1.6	1.5
Uruguay	1.8	2.3	2	2	2	1.8	1.8	1.5	2.1	1.5	1.7
India, Pakistan, and Sri Lanka	..	..	..	..	4.7	3.9	3.3	3.4	..	..	..
Yugoslavia	..	..	..	..	..	..	..	..	1.2	1.8	2.2
Cyprus and Turkey	..	..	..	..	..	..	..	11.3	8.8	12.0	
Denmark, Finland, Norway, and Sweden	..	..	..	..	..	..	..	..	52.1	65.2	69.0
Grand total	1,063.4	1,176.5	1,169.6	1,378.7	1,101.5	1,264.4	1,259.2	1,166.8	997.5	1,137.1	1,175.8

Tourist arrivals, by country of citizenship (in thousands) 1970–1980
Country	1980	1979	1978	1977	1976	1975	1974	1973	1972	1971	1970
United States	284.7	298.1	292.8	271.5	224.7	169.4	204.2	227.9	288.5	255.8	166.9
West Germany	157.4	145.0	131.2	110.4	63.6	49.8	43.6	42.3	43.2	34.5	20.2
United Kingdom	140.8	129.4	101.0	79.9	73.7	66.1	69.7	66.6	66.5	64.3	47.2
France	138.8	126.5	120.6	122.0	108.3	72.8	63.0	71.6	64.6	68.2	49.5
Denmark, Finland, Norway, and Sweden	69.0	71.7	67.7	64.1	46.6	31.3	28.8	34.0	37.9	29.4	18.9
Italy	55.8	46.3	45.9	37.0	34.7	24.5	19.7	18.1	18.2	16.1	8.4
Netherlands	37.1	39.7	35.1	34.1	27.8	18.5	18.5	19.9	19.8	17.0	9.9
Switzerland	34.1	34.4	31.3	30.8	25.1	19.9	19.8	20.5	21.8	16.8	10.1
Canada	26.5	30.2	32.9	35.3	29.1	25.4	24.7	22.2	23.9	25.6	17.9
South Africa	26.1	22.2	22.3	24.6	20.8	16.7	17.0	16.1	15.3	14.8	11.4
Austria	22.4	19.5	17.4	15.8	10.1	6.6	6.1	6.6	7.2	5.7	3.0
Belgium	20.9	20.8	18.9	18.3	14.0	11.7	10.7	11.5	10.5	10.5	7.6
Argentina	15.4	13.9	10.9	10.3	6.8	13.0	10.7	7.4	7.7	7.8	6.2
Australia	13.4	14.5	15.0	14.6	12.8	9.8	8.6	9.7	9.1	7.8	6.2
Greece	11.1	11.9	11.5	9.2	7.4	5.8	6.4	8.6	8.2	7.7	5.4
Spain	10.8	9.4	8.0	8.5	6.8	4.3	2.5	4.5	2.5	1.6	0.9
Mexico	9.4	7.9	6.5	5.7	5.0	7.1	3.5	4.3	3.7	3.4	2.2
Turkey	7.6	5.3	4.2	5.8	5.2	4.3	6.3	5.6	5.4	6.3	6.3
Brazil	7.3	6.9	6.6	5.4	6.0	6.4	3.5	5.0	4.9	4.9	4.0
Cyprus	5.7	3.2	3.1	2.3	1.6	1.4	3.3	4.9	4.3	4.0	2.7
Japan	3.4	3.8	2.4	2.6	2.4	2.4	1.8	2.5	2.3	4.0	1.0
Romania	3.0	3.7	3.2	3.2	3.0	2.4	4.0	4.4	5.2	2.5	2.0
New Zealand	2.6	2.2	2.5	2.5	1.3	1.1	1.1	1.1	1.2	0.9	0.8
Yugoslavia	2.2	3.3	2.4	2.5	2.2	1.9	1.5	1.3	2.2	1.3	0.8
Uruguay	1.7	1.3	1.1	1.1	0.9	0.9	1.1	1.7	0.8	1.0	1.1
Chile	1.5	1.6	1.4	1.4	1.2	1.4	0.9	1.1	1.4	1.6	1.1
Iran	0.0	0.0	27.3	23.1	18.4	9.7	9.3	9.5	9.7	8.5	6.7
Czechoslovakia	..	..	..	..	..	..	..	..	0.2	0.1	0.2
Grand total	1,175.8	1,138.6	1,070.8	986.5	796.6	619.6	624.7	661.7	727.5	656.8	436.9

Tourist arrivals, by country of citizenship (in thousands) 1960–1970
Country	1970	1969	1968	1967	1966	1965	1964	1963	1962	1961	1960
United States	166.9	148.5	153.5	90.7	95.8	83.2	71.7	68.3	59.1	55.5	49.7
France	49.5	49.4	39.6	32.3	39.4	34.2	30.5	25.0	19.9	17.2	10.0
United Kingdom	47.2	49.3	46.3	34.4	38.4	33.0	28.3	25.5	18.4	15.6	10.9
West Germany	20.2	17.7	13.5	10.5	13.0	11.9	9.6	7.7	7.5	5.8	4.1
Denmark, Finland, Norway, and Sweden	18.9	17.8	21.4	12.3	14.5	13.0	10.7	8.4	4.8	4.3	2.0
Canada	17.9	15.8	14.7	7.8	7.9	7.0	5.9	5.0	5.3	4.3	3.5
South Africa	11.4	9.3	9.2	6.8	5.7	5.9	5.1	5.3	4.6	5.5	0.8
Switzerland	10.1	11.8	12.6	8.8	10.4	9.3	10.0	6.3	4.7	3.3	2.4
Netherlands	9.9	10.8	14.0	9.3	8.0	7.9	7.2	4.9	3.4	3.5	2.4
Italy	8.4	8.3	9.4	8.1	11.0	8.3	7.3	5.4	4.2	3.3	2.8
Belgium	7.6	6.7	8.0	5.8	5.8	5.9	5.0	3.7	3.5	3.2	2.1
Iran	6.9	5.5	5.8	3.2	3.3	3.6	4.8	4.3	2.6	2.2	2.0
Turkey	6.3	5.3	3.5	2.3	2.4	2.9	2.6	1.2	1.6	1.5	1.2
Argentina	6.2	5.9	5.8	4.5	3.9	4.6	4.0	2.8	3.0	3.4	2.1
Australia	6.2	5.4	5.7	..	..	..	..	..	..	..	..
Greece	5.4	5.0	4.2	2.3	2.2	2.1	1.7	1.4	1.1	1.0	0.8
Brazil	4.0	3.4	3.5	2.4	2.8	2.6	2.7	3.0	1.9	1.4	1.2
Austria	3.0	4.2	4.2	3.4	2.9	2.9	2.2	1.9	1.6	1.7	1.0
Cyprus	2.7	2.0	1.6	0.7	1.1	0.9	1.0	1.3	1.0	0.8	0.8
Mexico	2.2	2.0	..	..	..	..	..	..	..	..	..
Romania	2.0	5.0	2.2	0.3	0.2	0.2	0.2	0.3	0.1	0.1	0.1
Uruguay	1.1	0.9	1.0	..	..	..	..	..	..	..	..
Chile	1.1	0.9	0.9	..	..	..	..	..	..	..	..
Japan	1.0	1.0	1.4	..	..	..	..	..	..	..	..
Spain	0.9	1.1	..	..	..	..	..	..	..	..	..
Yugoslavia	0.8	0.7	0.4	0.5	0.7	0.6	0.6	0.4	0.3	0.5	0.2
New Zealand	0.8	0.6	0.8	..	..	..	..	..	..	..	..
Czechoslovakia	0.2	0.8	..	..	..	..	..	..	..	..	..
Algeria, Morocco, and Tunisia	..	..	5.0	3.6	1.8	2.2	..	..	..	..	0.8
Czechoslovakia and Hungary	..	..	0.9	0.8	1.4	1.5	1.4	1.1	0.5	0.3	0.3
Poland	..	..	0.5	0.7	0.8	0.8	0.7	0.6	0.7	0.4	0.5
Grand total	436.9	409.0	432.0	291.2	318.1	296.5	251.6	218.5	183.7	159.6	114.0

Tourist arrivals, by country of citizenship 1950–1960
Country	1960	1959	1958	1957	1956	1955	1954	1953	1952	1951	1950
United States	49,724	35,972	25,664	11,671	12,659	18,332	13,232	11,854	11,435	9,324	8,669
France	10,888	8,901	7,673	4,947	4,046	4,916	4,039	3,695	3,234	3,992	3,682
United Kingdom	9,957	7,697	6,726	5,665	5,021	4.874	4,186	4,023	3,674	3,959	2,342
South Africa	4,531	2,384	2,410	1,868	1,400	2,225	2,079	1,703	1,370	1,684	1,444
West Germany	4,136	2,959	1,516	986	691	467	297	307	373	728	495
Canada	3,546	2,976	2,380	1,138	859	1,055	843	717	647	513	581
Switzerland	2,754	1,875	1,457	1,064	920	1,039	853	716	766	799	
Italy	2,443	2,313	1,797	1,270	1,170	1,275	1,124	1,026	1,103	1,208	864
Netherlands	2,374	1,496	1,322	1,091	827	773	672	641	618	705	612
Belgium	2,140	1,414	1,132	1,099	790	1,032	781	793	1,007	1,364	888
Argentina	2,103	955	1,194	716	785	1,163	999	856	649	553	488
Iran	2,038	1,678	1,415	827	612	388	277	397	501	891	395
Denmark, Finland, Norway, and Sweden	1,955	1,467	1,488	1,066	1,229	1,408	1,436	1,284	835	787	576
Brazil	1,175	633	968	599	475	376	457	464	438	348	236
Turkey	1,162	1,792	3,096	2,847	4,162	2,106	1,729	1,582	1,468	2,296	1,373
Austria	987	843	777	521	350	647	443	403	419	473	357
Cyprus	814	513	552	310	360	403	301	289	306	400	
Greece	804	660	753	705	418	356	423	283	505	589	512
Algeria, Morocco, and Tunisia	804	622	1,095	1,151	1,244	1,422	761	414	475	403	232
Poland	493	399	322	1,444	1,208	49	45	107	49	42	89
Yugoslavia	241	291	359	124	154	236	215	139	115	265	115
Hungary	190	90	60	119	38	31	39	30	36	42	28
Czechoslovakia	122	46	56	47	76	46	56	27	26	30	46
Romania	86	92	96	79	46	41	32	44	35	30	29
Grand total	113,956	83,614	69,777	44,562	42,567	48,212	38,661	35,212	32,965	35,893	28,913

Tourist arrivals, by country of citizenship 1949–1950
Country	1950	1949
United States	8,669	3,307
France	3,682	1,908
United Kingdom	2,342	979
South Africa	1,444	627
Turkey	1,373	102
Belgium	888	517
Italy	864	244
Netherlands	612	314
Canada	581	181
Denmark, Finland, Norway, and Sweden	576	173
Greece	512	124
West Germany	495	131
Argentina	488	..
Iran	395	13
Austria	357	57
Brazil	236	..
Algeria, Morocco, and Tunisia	232	53
Yugoslavia	115	12
Poland	89	110
Czechoslovakia	46	57
Romania	29	18
Hungary	28	22
Switzerland	..	266
Cyprus	..	93
Soviet Union	..	39
Bulgaria	..	15
Grand total	28,913	10,197

== Overstaying tourists ==
Overstaying tourists are visitors with B2 visa who haven't left Israel after their visa period is expired (mostly 3 months) and they haven't extended their B2 visa or changed to other type of visa. In many cases of the overstaying tourists, are tourist who also work illegally without work permit in Israel.

Overstaying tourists (in thousands)
31.12.2023				31.12.2022				31.12.2021				31.12.2020			
#	Country	Percentage	Number	#	Country	Percentage	Number	#	Country	Percentage	Number	#	Country	Percentage	Number
1.	Russia	19.3%	4.6	1.	Russia	20.2%	5.1	1.	Ukraine	23.5%	5.6	1.	Ukraine	24.0%	7.2
2.	Ukraine (Note: Legal overstaying for humanitarian reasons due to the Russian invasion of Ukraine. Citizens of Ukraine are allowed to overstay and work in Israel.)	16.5%	3.9	2.	Ukraine	18.0%	4.6	2.	Russia	17.6%	4.2	2.	Russia	17.4%	5.2
3.	Nigeria	8.4%	2	3.	Nigeria	8.8%	2.2	3.	Nigeria	9.5%	2.3	3.	Nigeria	7.7%	2.3
4.	Georgia	7.7%	1.8	4.	Georgia	7.3%	1.9	4.	Georgia	7.9%	1.9	4.	Georgia	7.1%	2.1
5.	Poland	4.1%	1	5.	Poland	4.1%	1	5.	Poland	4.3%	1	5.	Poland	3.5%	1.1
6.	Romania	3.5%	0.8	6.	Romania	3.0%	0.8	6.	Romania	2.9%	0.7	6.	Ethiopia	3.5%	1
7.	Brazil	3.3%	0.8	7.	Brazil	2.7%	0.7	7.	Philippines	2.6%	0.6	7.	Brazil	3.0%	0.9
8.	Colombia	3.2%	0.8	8.	Philippines	2.6%	0.7	8.	India	2.5%	0.6	8.	Romania	2.9%	0.9
9.	Philippines	3.0%	0.7	9.	Colombia	2.4%	0.6	9.	China	2.1%	0.5	9.	Philippines	2.2%	0.7
10.	India	2.8%	0.7	10.	India	2.3%	0.6	10.	Colombia	2.0%	0.5	10.	India	1.9%	0.6
11.	Mexico	1.8%	0.4	11.	Belarus	1.8%	0.5	11.	Brazil	1.6%	0.4	11.	Colombia	1.8%	0.5
12.	Moldova	1.6%	0.4	12.	Hong Kong	1.8%	0.5	12.	Fiji	1.4%	0.3	12.	China	1.4%	0.4
13.	Turkey	1.5%	0.4	13.	Mexico	1.7%	0.4	13.	Mexico	1.4%	0.3	13.	Moldova	1.3%	0.4
14.	Belarus	1.4%	0.3	14.	Moldova	1.5%	0.4	14.	Moldova	1.4%	0.3	14.	Turkey	1.3%	0.4
15.	China	1.4%	0.3	15.	China	1.3%	0.3	15.	Turkey	1.4%	0.3	15.	Fiji	1.2%	0.3
16.	Fiji	1.3%	0.3	16.	Fiji	1.3%	0.3	16.	Argentina	1.0%	0.2				
17.	South Africa	1.1%	0.3	17.	Turkey	1.2%	0.3	17.	Hong Kong	1.0%	0.2				
18.	Argentina	1.0%	0.2	18.	Argentina	1.0%	0.3	18.	South Africa	0.8%	0.2				
19.	Hong Kong	1.0%	0.2	19.	South Africa	1.0%	0.3	19.	Ethiopia	0.5%	0.1				
20.	Egypt	0.8%	0.2	20.	Egypt	0.6%	0.2								
21.	Ethiopia	0.6%	0.1	21.	Ethiopia	0.5%	0.1								
22.	Nepal	0.6%	0.1												
	Other Countries	14.1%	3.5		Other Countries	14.9%	3.8			14.6%	3.5		Other Countries	19.8%	6.1
	Total	100.0%	23.8		Total	100.0%	25.4		Total	100.0%	23.7		Total	100.0%	30.1
31.12.2019				31.12.2018				31.12.2017				31.12.2016			
#	Country	Percentage	Number	#	Country	Percentage	Number	#	Country	Percentage	Number	#	Country	Percentage	Number
1.	Belarus, Georgia, Moldova, Russia, Ukraine, and other former USSR countries	76.7%	37.3	1.	Belarus, Georgia, Moldova, Russia, Ukraine, and other former USSR countries	76.6%	44.6	1.	Belarus, Georgia, Moldova, Russia, Ukraine, and other former USSR countries	69.3%	46.2	1.	Belarus, Georgia, Moldova, Russia, Ukraine, and other former USSR countries	69.3%	51.3
2.	Egypt	3.5%	1.7	2.	Mexico	3.3%	1.9	2.	Romania	6.8%	4.5	2.	Romania	6.4%	4.7
3.	Venezuela	2.5%	1.2	3.	Egypt	2.7%	1.6	3.	Mexico	3.3%	2.2	3.	Mexico	3.6%	2.7
4.	Mexico	2.1%	1	4.	Venezuela	2.1%	1.2	4.	Egypt	2.4%	1.6	4.	Egypt	2.2%	1.6
5.	Peru	2.1%	1	5.	Peru	1.9%	1.1	5.	Venezuela	1.9%	1.2	5.	Venezuela	1.8%	1.3
6.	Morocco	1.4%	0.7	6.	Colombia	1.5%	0.9	6.	Peru	1.7%	1.1	6.	China	1.6%	1.2
7.	Colombia	1.2%	0.6	7.	Nepal	1.5%	0.9	7.	Colombia	1.3%	0.9	7.	Peru	1.6%	1.2
8.	Nepal	1.2%	0.6	8.	Bulgaria	1.0%	0.6	8.	Nepal	1.3%	0.9	8.	Hungary	1.4%	1
9.	Bolivia	1.0%	0.5	9.	Morocco	1.0%	0.6	9.	Hungary	1.1%	0.7	9.	Czechia and Slovakia	1.4%	1
10.	Uruguay	1.0%	0.5	10.	Uruguay	0.9%	0.5	10.	Czechia and Slovakia	1.0%	0.7	10.	Nepal	1.3%	1
	Other Countries	7.3%	3.5		Other Countries	7.5%	4.3		Other Countries	9.9%	6.7		Other Countries	9.4%	7
	Total	100.0%	48.6		Total	100.0%	58.2		Total	100.0%	66.7		Total	100.0%	74

== See also ==
- Foreign relations of Israel
- Visa requirements for Israeli citizens
- Israeli passport
- Israeli identity card
- Israeli permit regime in the West Bank
- Israeli permit regime in the Gaza Strip
- Israeli Identity Number
