= 1929 =

1929 in various calendars
- Gregorian calendar: 1929; MCMXXIX
- Ab urbe condita: 2682
- Armenian calendar: 1378; ԹՎ ՌՅՀԸ
- Assyrian calendar: 6679
- Baháʼí calendar: 85–86
- Balinese saka calendar: 1850–1851
- Bengali calendar: 1335–1336
- Berber calendar: 2879
- British Regnal year: 19 Geo. 5 – 20 Geo. 5
- Buddhist calendar: 2473
- Burmese calendar: 1291
- Byzantine calendar: 7437–7438
- Chinese calendar: 戊辰年 (Earth Dragon); 4626 or 4419 — to — 己巳年 (Earth Snake); 4627 or 4420
- Coptic calendar: 1645–1646
- Discordian calendar: 3095
- Ethiopian calendar: 1921–1922
- Hebrew calendar: 5689–5690
- Hindu calendars
- Vikram Samvat: 1985–1986
- Shaka Samvat: 1850–1851
- Kali Yuga: 5029–5030
- Holocene calendar: 11929
- Igbo calendar: 929–930
- Iranian calendar: 1307–1308
- Islamic calendar: 1347–1348
- Japanese calendar: Shōwa 4 (昭和４年)
- Javanese calendar: 1859–1860
- Juche calendar: 18
- Julian calendar: Gregorian minus 13 days
- Korean calendar: 4262
- Minguo calendar: ROC 18 民國18年
- Nanakshahi calendar: 461
- Thai solar calendar: 2471–2472
- Tibetan calendar: ས་ཕོ་འབྲུག་ལོ་ (male Earth-Dragon); 2055 or 1674 or 902 — to — ས་མོ་སྦྲུལ་ལོ་ (female Earth-Snake); 2056 or 1675 or 903

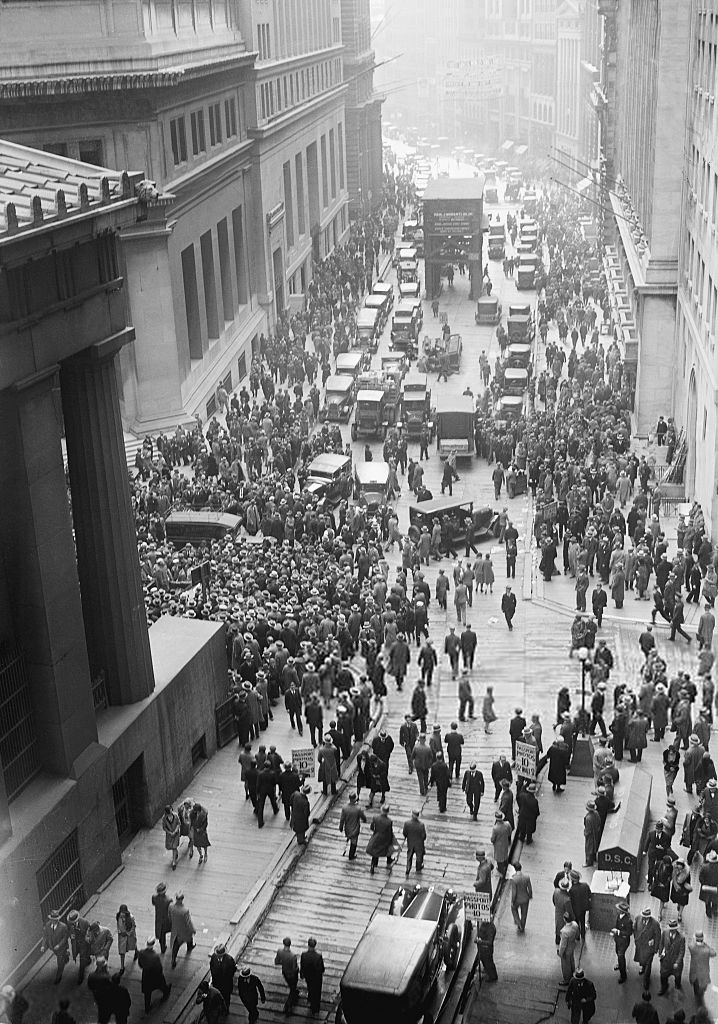
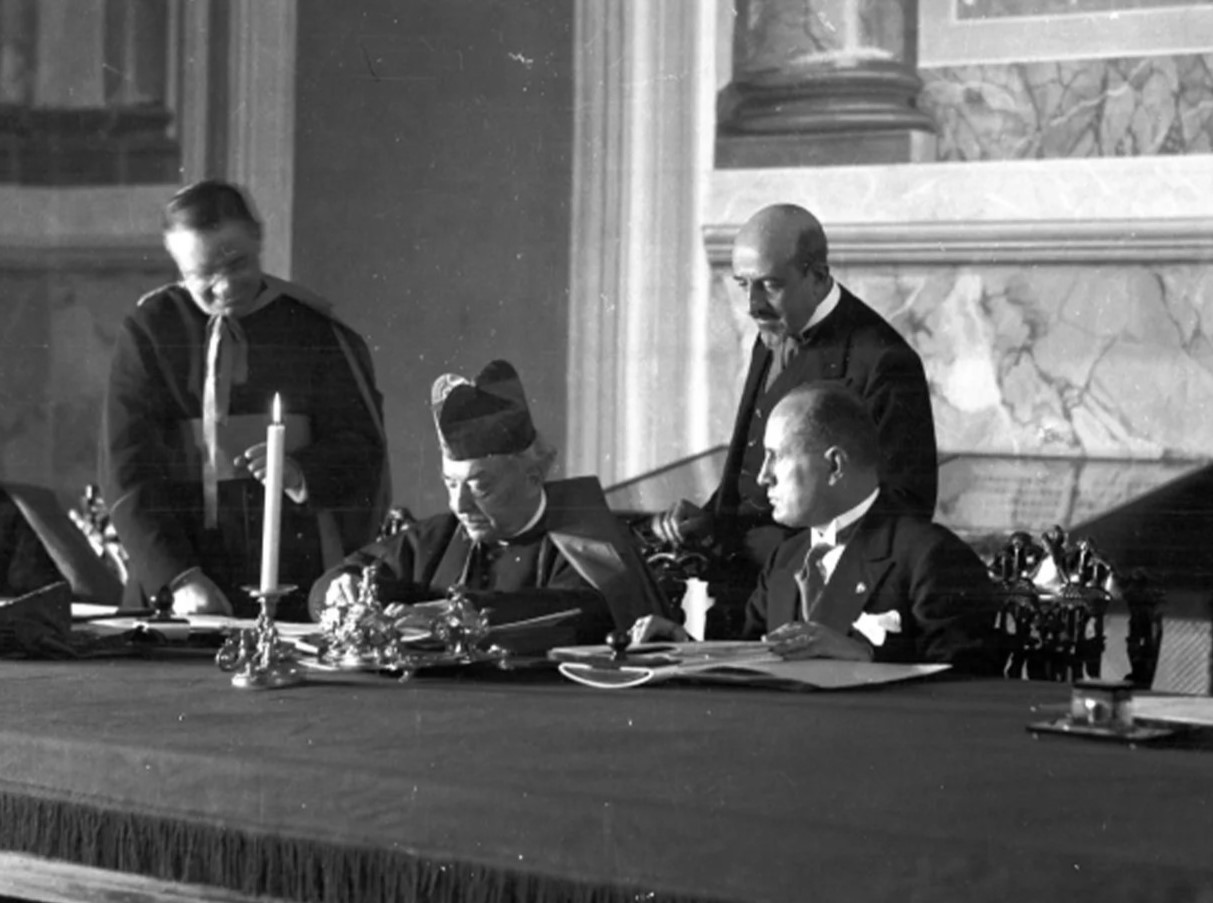
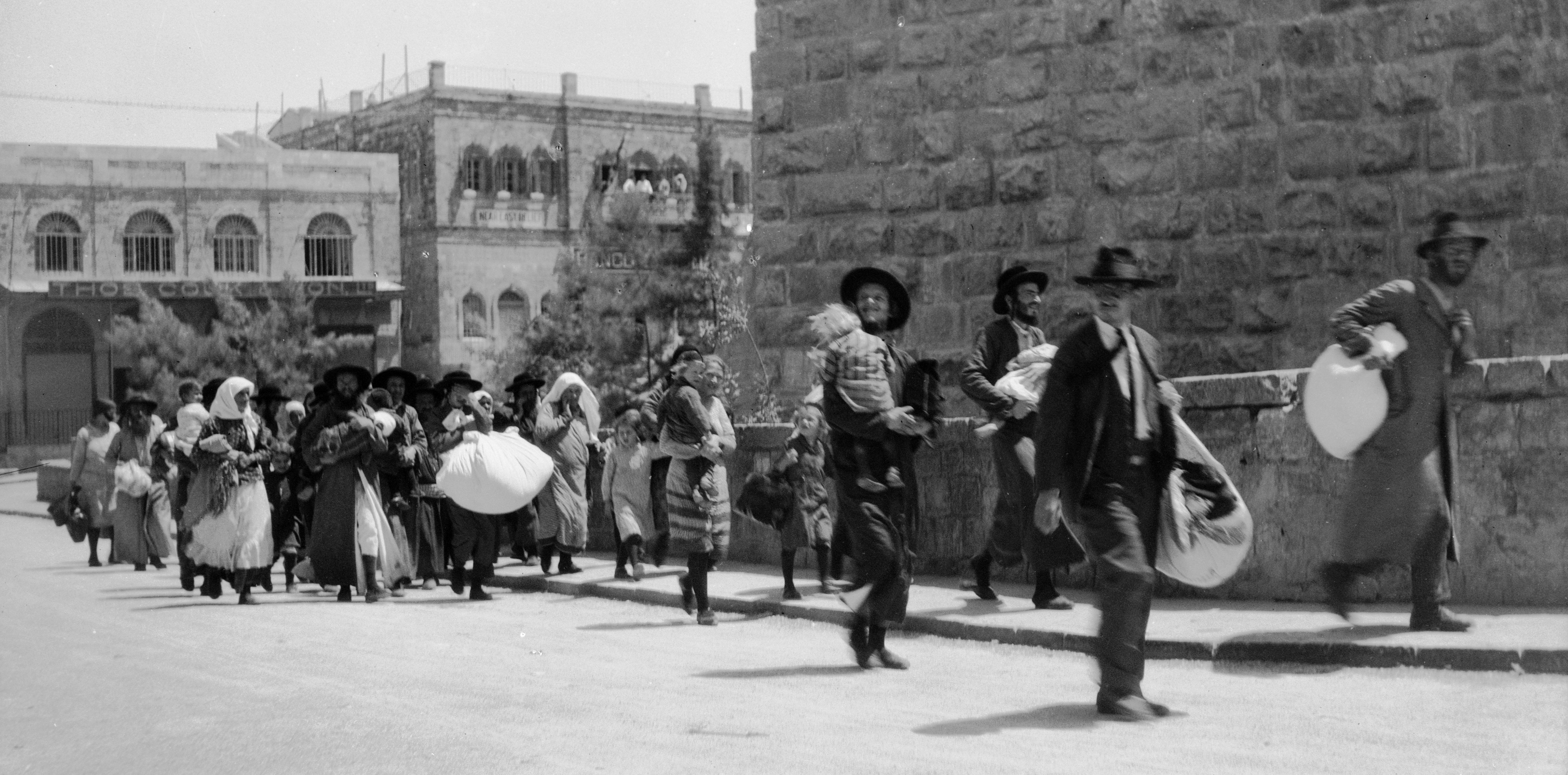
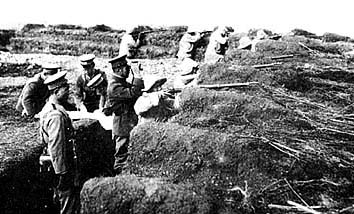
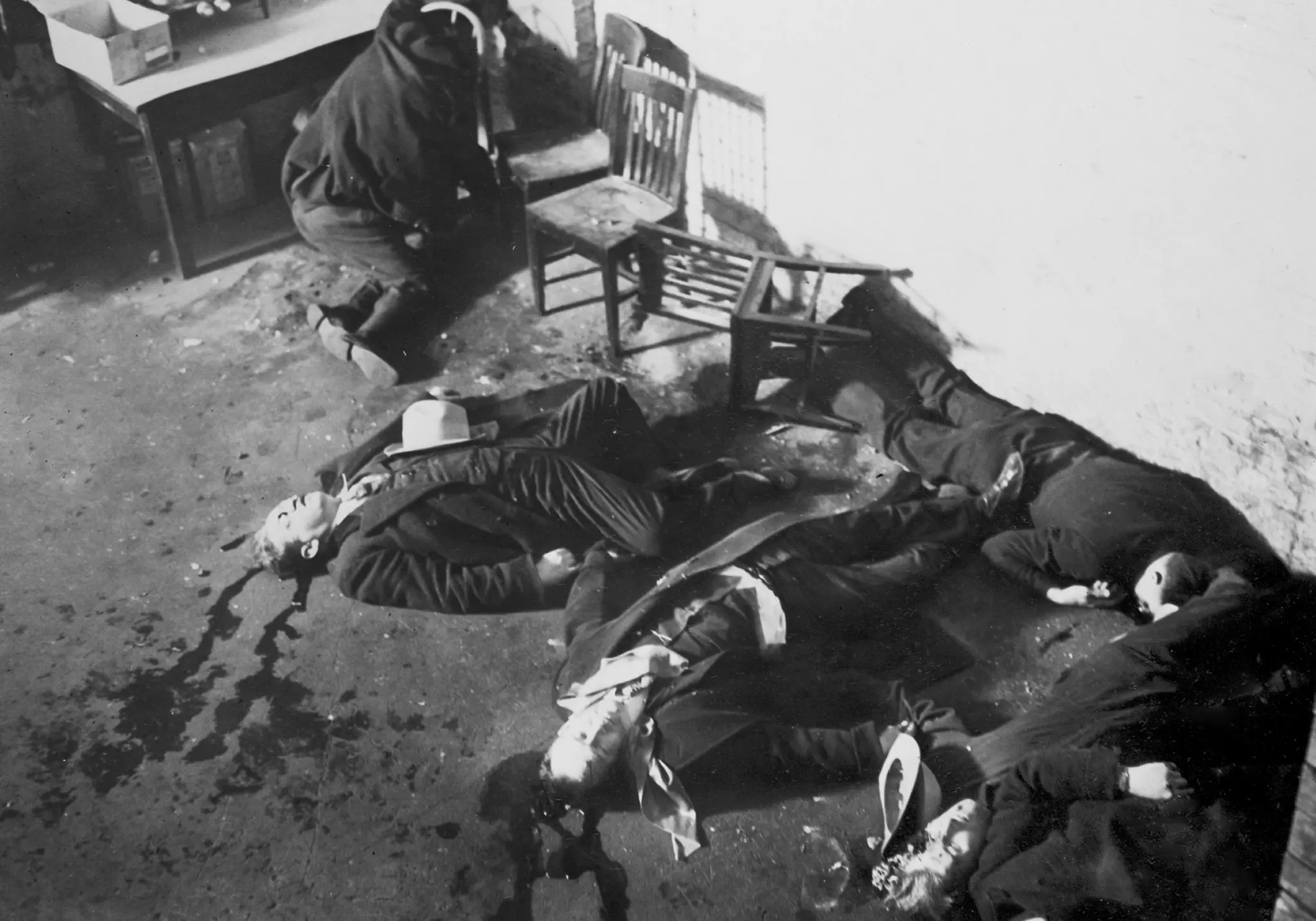
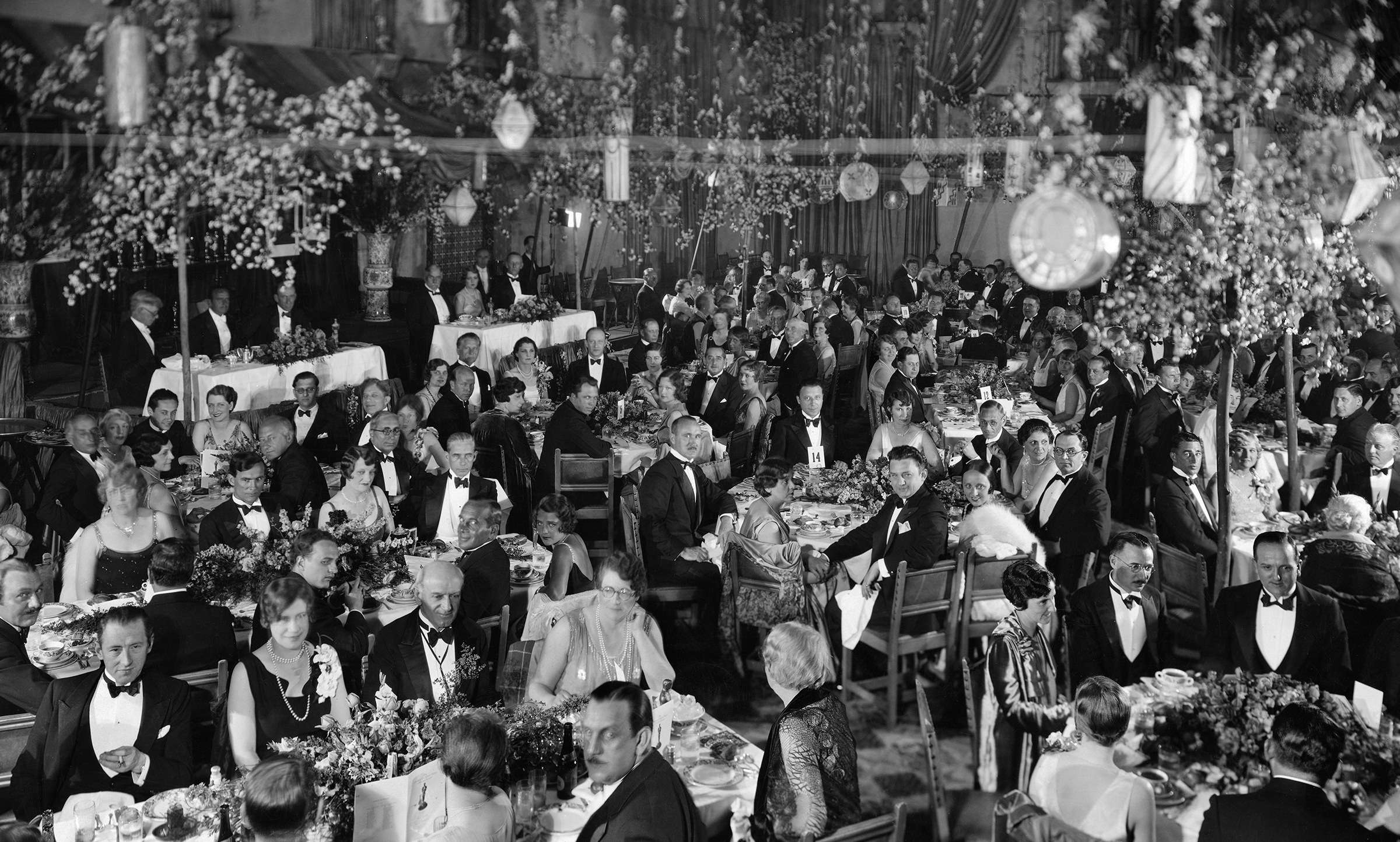
From top to bottom, left to right:
- The Wall Street Crash of 1929 devastates global markets, sparking the Great Depression and years of economic hardship;
- The Lateran Treaty establishes Vatican City as an independent state, resolving the “Roman Question”;
- The 1929 Palestine riots erupt across Jerusalem, Hebron, and Safed, killing hundreds and deepening Jewish-Arab tensions;
- The Sino-Soviet conflict (1929) erupts over the Chinese Eastern Railway, leading to a brief military clash;
- The St. Valentine’s Day Massacre shocks Chicago with the murder of seven North Side Gang members during Prohibition;
- The 1st Academy Awards are held in Hollywood, inaugurating the Oscars.

1929 (MCMXXIX) was a common year starting on Tuesday of the Gregorian calendar, the 1929th year of the Common Era (CE) and Anno Domini (AD) designations, the 929th year of the 2nd millennium, the 29th year of the 20th century, and the 10th and last year of the 1920s decade.

This year marked the end of a period known in American history as the Roaring Twenties after the Wall Street Crash of 1929 ushered in a worldwide Great Depression. In the Americas, an agreement was brokered to end the Cristero War, a Catholic counter-revolution in Mexico. The Judicial Committee of the Privy Council, a British high court, ruled that Canadian women are persons in the Edwards v. Canada (Attorney General) case. The 1st Academy Awards for film were held in Los Angeles, while the Museum of Modern Art opened in New York City. The Cuerpo de Aviación del Perú was created.

In Asia, the Republic of China and the Soviet Union engaged in a minor conflict after the Chinese seized full control of the Manchurian Chinese Eastern Railway, which ended with a resumption of joint administration. In the Soviet Union, General Secretary Joseph Stalin expelled Leon Trotsky and adopted a policy of collectivization. The Grand Trunk Express began service in India. Rioting between Muslims and Jews in Jerusalem over access to the Western Wall took place in the Middle East. The centenary of Western Australia was celebrated. The Afghan Civil War, which started in November in the preceding year, continued until October.

The Kellogg–Briand Pact, a treaty renouncing war as an instrument of national policy, went into effect. In Europe, the Holy See and the Kingdom of Italy signed the Lateran Treaty. The Idionymon law was passed in Greece to outlaw political dissent. Spain hosted the Ibero-American Exposition which featured pavilions from Latin American countries. The German airship LZ 127 Graf Zeppelin flew around the world in 21 days.

== Summary ==
=== Middle East, Asia, and Pacific Isles ===
On August 1 of this year the 1929 Palestine riots broke out between Arabs and Jews over control of the Western Wall. The rioting, initiated in part when British police tore down a screen the Jews had constructed in front of the Wall, continued until the end of the month. In total, 133 Jews and 116 Arabs were killed.

Early in 1929, the Afghan Civil War saw the Afghan leader King Amanullah lose power to the Saqqawists under Habibullāh Kalakāni. Kalakani's rule, however, only lasted nine months. Nadir Shah replaced him in October, starting a line of monarchs which would last 40 years. In India, a general strike in Bombay continued throughout the year despite efforts by the British. On December 29, the All India Congress in Lahore declared Indian independence from Britain, something it had threatened to do if Britain did not grant India dominion status. China and Russia engaged in a minor conflict after China seized full control of the Manchurian Chinese Eastern Railway. Russia counterattacked and took the cities of Hailar and Manzhouli after issuing an ultimatum demanding joint control of the railway to be reinstated. The Chinese agreed to the terms on November 26. The Japanese would later see this defeat as a sign of Chinese weakness, leading to their taking control of Manchuria. The Far East began to experience economic problems late in the year as the effects of the Great Depression began to spread. Southeast Asia was especially hard hit as its exports (spice, rubber, and other commodities) were more sensitive to economic problems. In the Pacific, on December 28 – "Black Saturday" in Samoa – New Zealand colonial police killed 11 unarmed demonstrators, an event which led the Mau movement to demand independence for Samoa.

=== Europe ===
==== Western ====
In 1929, the Fascist Party in Italy tightened its control. National education policy took a major step towards being completely taken over by the agenda of indoctrination. In that year, the Fascist government took control of the authorization of all textbooks, all secondary school teachers were required to take an oath of loyalty to Fascism, and children began to be taught that they owed the same loyalty to Fascism as they did to God.

On February 11, the Kingdom of Italy and the Holy See signed the Lateran Treaty, making Vatican City a sovereign state. On July 25, Pope Pius XI emerged from the Vatican and entered St. Peter's Square in a huge procession witnessed by about 250,000 persons, thus ending nearly 60 years of papal self-imprisonment within the Vatican. Italy used the diplomatic prestige associated with this successful agreement to adopt a more aggressive foreign policy. Germany experienced a major turning point in this year due to the economic crash. The country had experienced prosperity under the government of the Weimar Republic until foreign investors withdrew their German interests. This began the crumbling of the Republican government in favor of Nazism. In 1929, the number of unemployed reached three million. On July 27, the Geneva Convention, held in Switzerland, addressed the treatment of prisoners of war in response to problems encountered during World War I.

On May 31, the British general election returned a hung parliament yet again, with the Liberals in position to determine who would have power. These elections were known as the "Flapper" elections due to the fact that it was the first British election in which women under 30 could vote. A week after the vote, on June 7 the Conservatives conceded power rather than ally with the Liberals. Ramsay MacDonald founded a new Labour government the next day.

1929 is regarded as a turning point by French historians, who point out that it was last year in which prosperity was felt before the effects of the Great Depression. The Third Republic had been in power since before World War I. On July 24, French prime minister Raymond Poincaré resigned for medical reasons; he was succeeded by Aristide Briand. Briand adopted a foreign policy of both peace and defensive fortification. The Kellogg–Briand Pact, renouncing war as an instrument of foreign policy, went into effect in this year (it was first signed in Paris in 1928 by most leading world powers). The French began work on the Maginot Line in this year, as a defense against a possible German attack, and on September 5 Briand presented a plan for the United States of Europe. On October 22, Briand was replaced as prime minister by André Tardieu. Primo de Rivera's dictatorship in Spain experienced growing dissatisfaction among students and academics, as well as businessmen who blamed the government for recent economic woes. Many called for a fascist regime, like that in Italy.

==== Eastern ====
In May, Joseph Stalin consolidated his power in the Soviet Union by sending Leon Trotsky into exile. The only country that would grant Trotsky asylum was Turkey, in return for his help during Turkey's civil war. He and his family left the USSR aboard ship on February 12. Stalin turned on his former political ally, Nikolai Bukharin, who was the last real threat to his power. By the end of the year Bukharin had been defeated. Once Stalin was in power, he turned his former support for Lenin's New Economic Policy into opposition. In November, Stalin declared that it "The Year of the Great Breakthrough" and stated that the country would focus on industrial programs as well as on collectivizing the grain supply. He hoped to surpass the West not only in agriculture, but in industry. Millions of Soviet farmers were removed from their private farms, their property was collected, and they were moved to state-owned farms. Stalin emphasized in 1929 a campaign demonizing kulaks as a plague on society. Kulak property was taken and they were deported by cattle train to areas of frozen tundra.

The timber market in Finland began to decline in 1929 due to the Great Depression, as well as the Soviet Union's entrance into the market. Financial and political problems culminated in the birth of the fascist Lapua Movement on November 23 in a demonstration in Lapua. The movement's stated aim was Finnish democracy and anti-communism. The Finnish legislature received heavy pressure to remove basic rights from Communist groups. Politics in Lithuania was heated, as President Voldemaras was unpopular in some quarters, and survived an assassination attempt in Kaunas. Later, while attending a meeting of the League of Nations, he was ousted in a coup by President Smetona, who made himself dictator. Upon Voldemaras' removal from office, Geležinis Vilkas went underground and received aid and encouragement in its activities from Germany. The Kingdom of Serbs, Croats and Slovenes was renamed the "Kingdom of Yugoslavia" as King Alexander sought to unite the South Slavs under his rule. The state's new Monarchy replaced the old parliament, which had been dominated by Serbs.

=== North America ===
In October 1929, the British Judicial Committee of the Privy Council overturned a ruling by the Supreme Court of Canada that women could not be members of the legislature. This case, which came to be known as the Persons Case, had important ramifications not just for the rights of women but because in overturning the case, the Judicial Committee of the Privy Council engendered a radical change in the Canadian judicial approach to the Canadian constitution, an approach that has come to be known as the "living tree doctrine". The five women who initiated the case are known in Canada as the Famous Five. In November, the 1929 Grand Banks earthquake occurred off the south coast of Newfoundland in the Atlantic Ocean. It registered as a Richter magnitude 7.2 submarine earthquake centered on Grand Banks, broke 12 submarine transatlantic telegraph cables and triggered a tsunami that destroyed many south coast communities in the Burin Peninsula area, killing 28 (as of 1997, Canada's most lethal earthquake). Ross-Loos Medical Group is established in downtown Los Angeles by two physicians, Donald E. Ross and H. Clifford Loos - the first HMO in the United States.

The Mexican Cristero War continued in 1929 as clerical forces attempted an assassination of the provisional president in a train bombing in February. The attempt failed. Plutarco Calles, at the center of power for the anti-clerics, continued to gather power in Mexico City. His government was considered an enemy to more conservative Mexicans who held to traditional forms of government and more religious control. Calles founded the National Revolutionary Party early in the year to increase his power; a party which was, ironically, seen by foreigners as fascist and which was in opposition to the Mexican Right. A special election was held in this year, which Jose Vasconselos lost to Ortiz Rubio. By this time, the war had ended. The last group of rebels was defeated on June 4, and in the same month US Ambassador Dwight Morrow initiated talks between parties. On June 21 an agreement was brokered ending the Cristero War. On June 27, church bells rang and mass was held publicly for the first time in three years. The agreement heavily favored the government, as priests were required to register with the government and religion was banned from schools.

The major event of the year for the United States was the stock market crash on Wall Street, which was to have international effects and be widely regarded as the inciting incident of the Great Depression. On September 3, the Dow Jones Industrial Average (DJIA) peaked at 381.17, a height it would not reach again until November 1954. Then, from October 24–October 29, stock prices suffered three multi-digit percentage drops, wiping out more than $30 billion from the New York Stock Exchange (10 times greater than the annual budget of the federal government). On December 3 U.S. President Herbert Hoover announced to the U.S. Congress that the worst effects of the recent stock market crash were behind the nation, and that the American people had regained faith in the economy.

=== Literature, arts, and entertainment ===
Literature of the time reflected the memories many harbored of the horrors of World War I. A major seller was All Quiet on the Western Front by Erich Maria Remarque. Remarque was a German who had fought in the war at age eighteen and been wounded in the Third Battle of Ypres. He stated that he intended the book to tell the story "of a generation of men who, even though they may have escaped its shells, were destroyed by the war." Another 1929 book reflecting on World War I was Ernest Hemingway's A Farewell to Arms, as well as Good-Bye to All That by Robert Graves. In lighter media, a few stars of the comic industry made their debut, including Tintin, a comic book character created by Hergé, who would appear in over 200 million comic books in 60 languages. Popeye, another comic strip character created by Elzie Crisler Segar, also appeared in this year.

Within the film industry, on May 16 the 1st Academy Awards were presented at the Hollywood Roosevelt Hotel, with Wings winning Best Picture. Also, Hallelujah! became the first Hollywood film to contain an entirely black cast, and Atlantic, a film about the Titanic, is an early sound-on-film movie. The arts were in the midst of the Modernist movement, as Pablo Picasso painted two cubist works, Woman in a Garden and Nude in an Armchair, during this year. The surrealist painters Salvador Dalí and René Magritte completed several works, including The First Days of Spring and The Treachery of Images. On November 7 in New York City, the Museum of Modern Art opened to the public. The latest in modern architecture was also represented by the Barcelona Pavilion in Spain, and the Royal York Hotel in Toronto, at its completion the tallest building in the British Empire.

=== Science and technology ===
The year saw several advances in technology and exploration. On June 27 the first public demonstration of color TV was held by H. E. Ives and his colleagues at Bell Telephone Laboratories in New York. The first images were a bouquet of roses and an American flag. A mechanical system was used to transmit 50-line color television images between New York and Washington. The BBC broadcast a television transmission for the first time. By November, Vladimir Zworykin had taken out the first patent for color television. On November 29, Bernt Balchen, U.S. Admiral Richard Byrd, Captain Ashley McKinley, and Harold June, became the first to fly over the South Pole. Within the year, Britain, Australia and New Zealand began a joint Antarctic Research Expedition, and the German airship Graf Zeppelin began a round-the-world flight (ended August 29). This year Ernst Schwarz describes Bonobo (Pan paniscus) as a different species from common chimpanzee (Pan troglodytes), both closely related phylogenetically to human beings.

== Events ==
Map of the world and its leaders by the Geographical Publishing Company

=== January ===
- January 6
  - 6 January Dictatorship: King Alexander of the Serbs, Croats, and Slovenes suspends his country's constitution.
  - Albanian missionary sister Agnes Gonxha Bojaxhiu, later known as Mother Teresa, arrives in Calcutta from Ireland to begin her work in India.
- January 10 – The first appearance of Hergé's Belgian comic book hero Tintin, as Tintin in the Land of the Soviets (Les Aventures de Tintin, reporter..., au pays des Soviets), begins serialization in the children's newspaper supplement, Le Petit Vingtième.
- January 17 – The comic strip hero Popeye first appears in Thimble Theatre.
- January 17 – Kabul falls to Habibullāh Kalakāni's forces, beginning a 9-month period of Saqqawist rule in Afghanistan while the Afghan Civil War continues.
- January 29 – All Quiet on the Western Front (Im Westen nichts Neues), by Erich Maria Remarque, is published in book form.

=== February ===
- February 9 – "Litvinov's Pact" is signed in Moscow by the Soviet Union, Poland, Estonia, Romania and Latvia, who agree not to use force to settle disputes between themselves.
- February 11 – The Kingdom of Italy and the Holy See of the Catholic Church sign the Lateran Treaty, to establish the Vatican City as an independent sovereign enclave within Rome, resolving the "Roman Question".
- February 14 – "Saint Valentine's Day Massacre": Five gangsters (rivals of Al Capone), plus a civilian, are shot dead in Chicago.
- February 21 – In the first battle of the Warlord Rebellion in northeastern Shandong against the Nationalist government of China, a 24,000-strong rebel force led by Zhang Zongchang is defeated at Zhifu by 7,000 NRA troops.
- February 26 – Grand Teton National Park is established by the United States Congress.

=== March ===
- March 2 – The longest bridge in the world at this time, the San Francisco Bay Toll-Bridge, opens.
- March 3 – A revolt by Generals José Gonzalo Escobar and Jesús María Aguirre fails in Mexico.
- March 4
  - The National Revolutionary Party (Partido Nacional Revolucionario) is established in Mexico, by ex-President Plutarco Elías Calles. Under a succession of names, it will hold power in the country continuously for the next 71 years.
  - Charles Curtis takes office as the first multiracial Vice President of the United States.
- March 17 – The second of the Davos University Conferences opens in Switzerland; this includes the Cassirer–Heidegger debate in philosophy.
- March 28 – Japanese forces withdraw from Shandong province to their garrison in Qingdao, bringing an end to the Jinan Incident.
- March 30 – Imperial Airways begins operating the first commercial flights between London and Karachi.

=== April ===
- April 3 – Persia signs the Litvinov Protocol.
- April 14 – The first edition of the Monaco Grand Prix is held.

=== May ===
- May – The American Continental Workers' Association is established by a congress of anarcho-syndicalist trade union federations in Buenos Aires.
- May 1 – The 7.2 M_{w} Kopet Dag earthquake shakes the Iran-Turkmenistan border region, with a maximum Mercalli intensity of IX (Violent), killing up to 3,800 and injuring 1,121.
- May 16 – The 1st Academy Awards are presented in a 15-minute ceremony at the Hollywood Roosevelt Hotel, honoring the best movies of 1927 and 1928, Wings (1927) winning Best Picture. Gerald Duffy (died 1928) receives the only Academy Award for Best Title Writing ever awarded (for his intertitles to the silent film The Private Life of Helen of Troy (1927)).
- May 31 – The United Kingdom general election again returns a hung parliament; the Liberals in Parliament determine which party will govern.

=== June ===
- June 1 – The 1st Conference of the Communist Parties of Latin America is held in Buenos Aires.
- June 3 – The Treaty of Lima settles a border dispute between Peru and Chile.
- June 7 – The Lateran Treaty, making Vatican City a sovereign state, is ratified.
- June 8 – Ramsay MacDonald forms the United Kingdom's second Labour government.
- June 21 – An agreement brokered by U.S. Ambassador Dwight Whitney Morrow helps end the Cristero War in Mexico.
- June 27 – The first public demonstration of color TV is held, by H. E. Ives and his colleagues at Bell Telephone Laboratories in New York. The first images are a bouquet of roses and an American flag. A mechanical system is used to transmit 50-line color television images between New York and Washington.

=== July ===
- July 24
  - The Kellogg–Briand Pact, renouncing war as an instrument of foreign policy, goes into effect (it was first signed in Paris on August 27, 1928, by most leading world powers).
  - Union Airways Pty. Ltd. is founded, to be nationalised as South African Airways, on 1 February 1934.
- July 25 – Pope Pius XI emerges from the Apostolic Palace, and enters St. Peter's Square in a huge procession witnessed by about 250,000 persons, thus ending nearly 60 years of self-imposed status by the papacy as Prisoner in the Vatican.
- July 27
  - The Geneva Convention addresses the treatment of prisoners of war.
  - The Red Crescent is adopted as an additional emblem of the League of Red Cross Societies.
- July 29 – the French prime minister Raymond Poincaré resigns, and is succeeded by Aristide Briand.

=== August ===
- August 8–29 – German rigid airship LZ 127 Graf Zeppelin makes a circumnavigation of the Northern Hemisphere eastabout out of Lakehurst, New Jersey, including the first nonstop flight of any kind across the Pacific Ocean (Tokyo–Los Angeles).
- August 16 – The 1929 Palestine riots break out between Palestinians and Jews in Mandatory Palestine, and continue until the end of the month. In total, 133 Jews and 116 Palestinians are killed.
- August 20 – John Logie Baird's experimental 30-line television system is first transmitted, by the British Broadcasting Corporation in London.
- August 23–24 – The 1929 Hebron massacre: 65–68 Jews are killed by Palestinians and the remaining Jews are forced to leave Hebron.
- August 29
  - The 1929 Palestine riots: 18–20 Jews are killed in Safed by Palestinian Arabs.
  - The SS San Juan collides with the oil tanker S.C.T. Dodd off the California coast, causing the San Juan to sink in 3 minutes, killing 77 people.
- August 31 – The Young Plan, which sets the total World War I reparations owed by Germany at US$26,350,000,000 to be paid over a period of 58½ years, is finalized.

=== September ===
- September 3 – The Dow Jones Industrial Average peaks at 381.17, a height it would not reach again until November 1954.
- September 5 – Aristide Briand presents his plan for the United States of Europe.
- September 7 – The steamship SS Kuru sank in Lake Näsijärvi near Tampere, Finland, leading to 138 people drowning.
- September 17 – A coup ousts Augustinas Voldemaras from his prime minister position in Lithuania; he is replaced by the brother-in-law of President Antanas Smetona, Juozas Tūbelis.
- September 30 – Fritz von Opel pilots the first rocket-powered aircraft, the Opel RAK.1, in front of a large crowd in Frankfurt am Main.

=== October ===
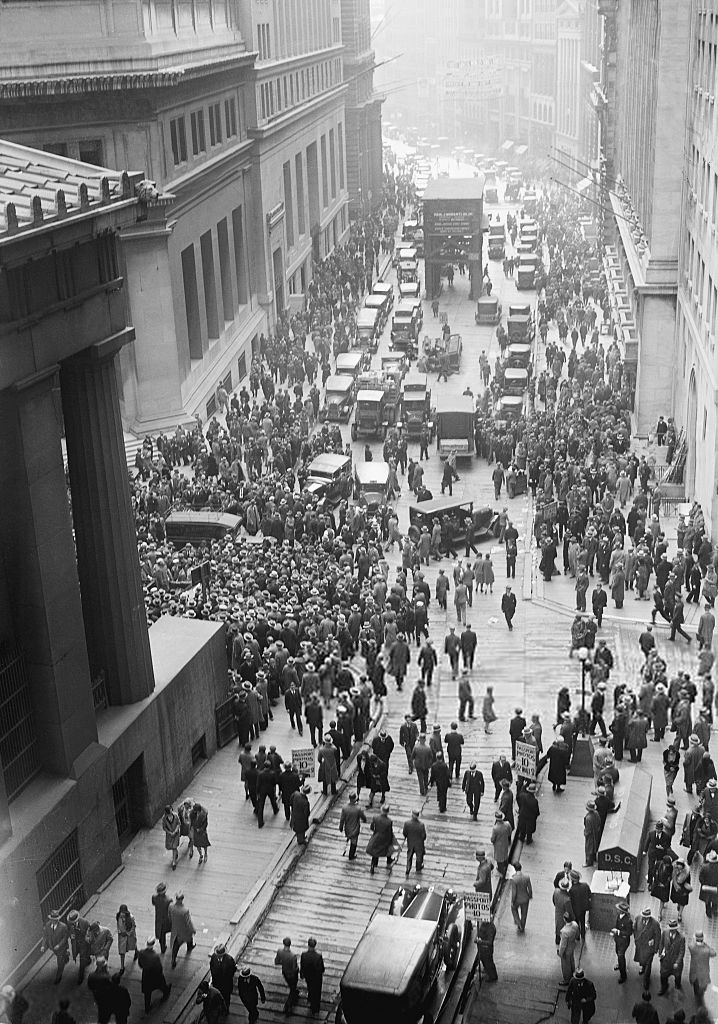
October 24–29: The Wall Street Crash of 1929, the beginning of the Great Depression.

- October 3 – The country officially known as the Kingdom of Serbs, Croats and Slovenes changes its name to the Kingdom of Yugoslavia.
- October 6 – Serie A, the top-class professional football league of Italy, replaces the Divisione Nazionale.
- October 8 – Cubana de Aviación is founded.
- October 12 – 1929 Australian federal election: The Labor Party, led by James Scullin, defeats the Nationalist/Country Coalition Government, led by Prime Minister Stanley Bruce. Scullin will be sworn in on October 22. Notably, this is the first occasion in Australian political history where a sitting prime minister loses his own seat (the second being John Howard in 2007).
- October 13 – Afghan Civil War ends.
- October 18 – On appeal from the Supreme Court of Canada on behalf of "The Famous Five" Canadian women in the landmark case of Edwards v. Canada (Attorney General), the Judicial Committee of the Privy Council in the United Kingdom announces that women are "persons" under the British North America Acts, and thus eligible for appointment to the Senate of Canada.
- October 22 – The government of Aristide Briand falls in France.
- October 24–29 – Wall Street Crash of 1929: Three multi-digit percentage drops wipe out more than $30 billion from the New York Stock Exchange (10 times greater than the annual budget of the federal government).
- October 25 – Former U.S. Interior Secretary Albert B. Fall is convicted of bribery for his role in the Teapot Dome scandal, becoming the first Presidential cabinet member to go to prison for actions in office.

=== November ===
- November – Vladimir Zworykin takes out the first patent for color television.
- November 1
  - An annular solar eclipse is seen over the Atlantic Ocean and Africa.
  - Conscription in Australia ends.
- November 7 – In New York City, the Museum of Modern Art (MoMA) opens to the public. The first exhibition Cézanne, Gauguin, van Gogh and Seurat (November 7 – December 7) is seen by 47.000 visitors; the curator is Alfred H. Barr.
- November 15 – Atlantic, a film drama about the sinking of the RMS Titanic, is released in the U.K. The simultaneously shot German-language version is the first sound film feature to be released in Germany.
- November 18 – The 1929 Grand Banks earthquake occurs.
- November 29 – Bernt Balchen, U.S. Admiral Richard E. Byrd, Captain Ashley McKinley and Harold June become the first to fly over the South Pole.

=== December ===
- December – New York toy salesman Edwin S. Lowe popularizes Bingo after coming across the game of "Beano" in Atlanta, Georgia. After someone accidentally yells "bingo" instead of "beano" with a group of friends in Brooklyn, New York, he begins production of the game, going on to develop more than 6,000 card combinations under the E. S. Lowe company, as the popularity of the game grows to become a national pastime.
- December 27 – Soviet General Secretary Joseph Stalin orders the "liquidation of the kulaks as a class".
- December 28 – "Black Saturday" in Samoa: New Zealand colonial police kill 11 unarmed demonstrators, an event which leads the Mau movement to demand independence for Samoa.
- December 29 – The All India Congress in Lahore demands Indian independence.

=== Date unknown ===
- Slavery in Jordan is abolished.

== Births ==
=== January ===
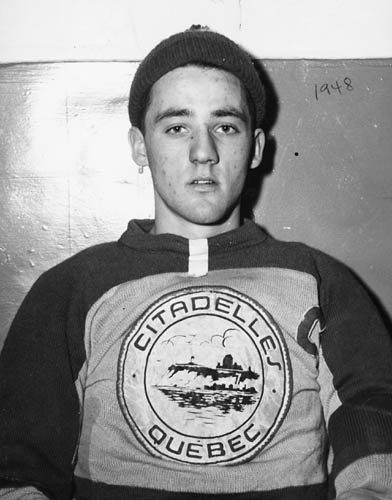
Jacques Plante

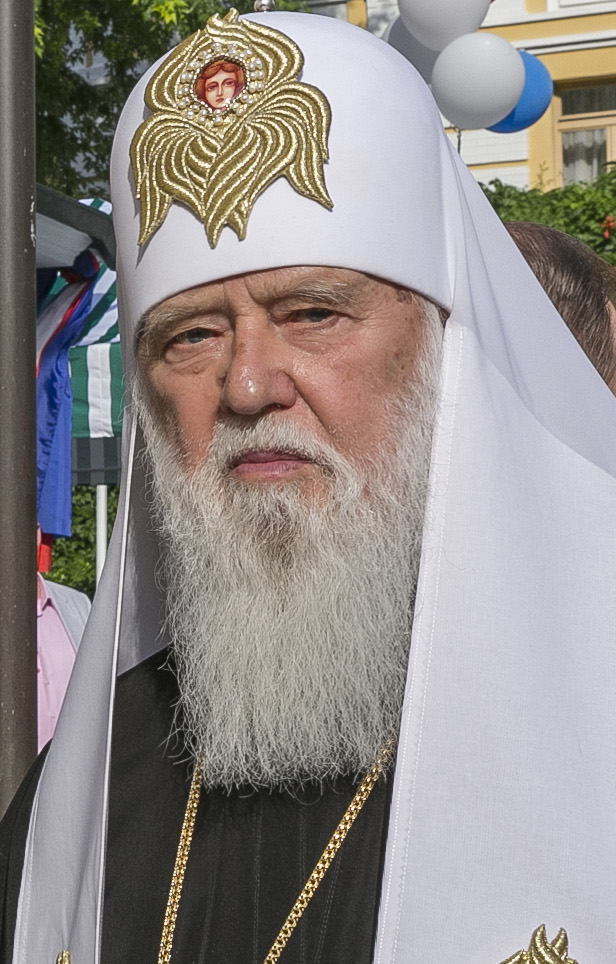
Patriarch Filaret

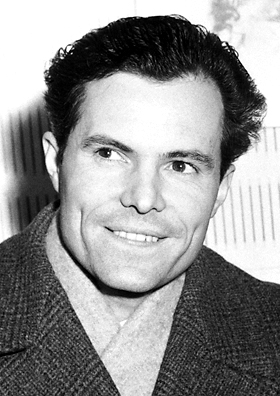
Rudolf Mössbauer

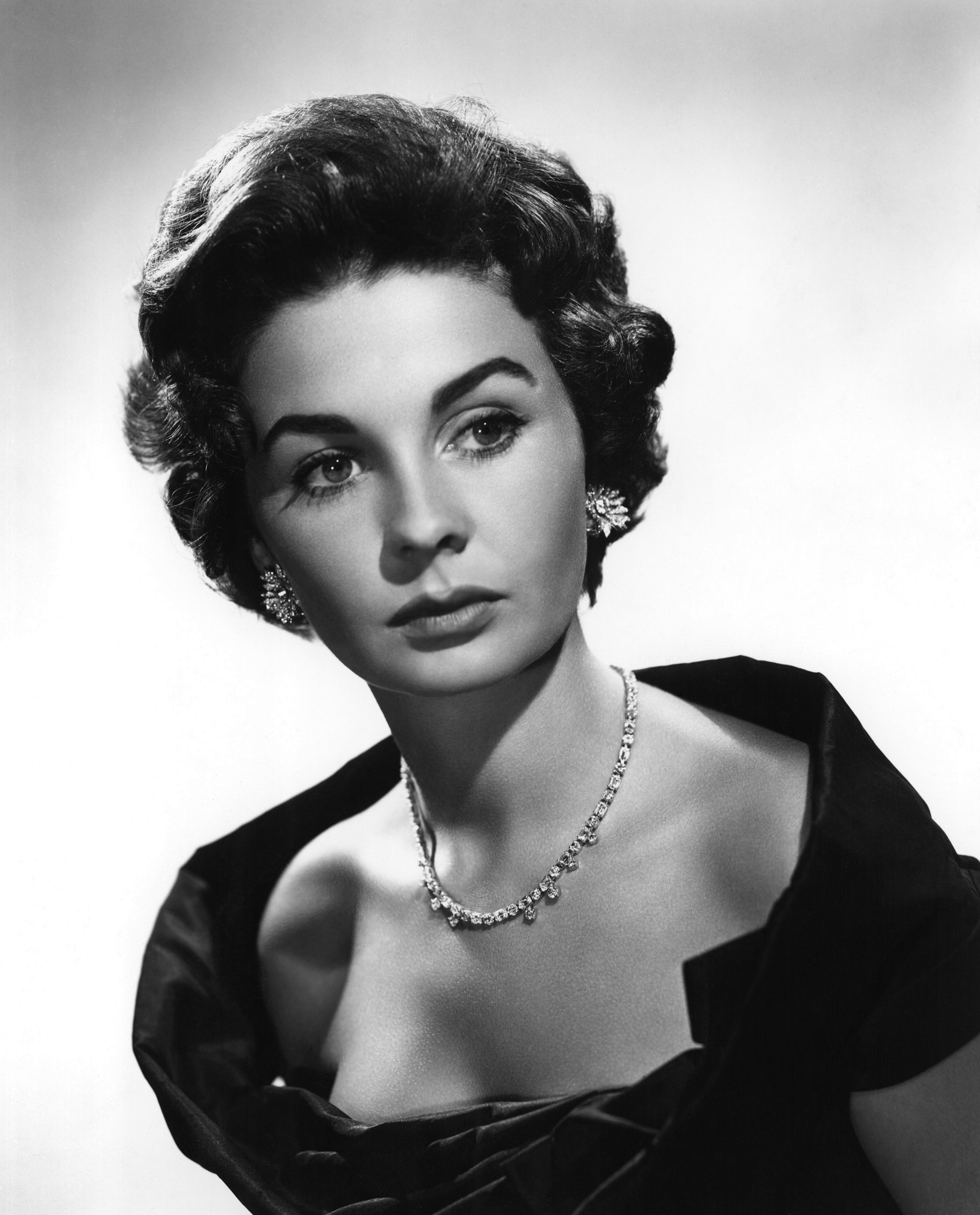
Jean Simmons

- January 1
  - Haruo Nakajima, Japanese actor (d. 2017)
  - Latif-ur-Rehman, Indian field hockey player (d. 1987)
- January 2 – Tellervo Koivisto, Finnish politician and former First Lady of Finland
- January 3
  - Sergio Leone, Italian director (d. 1989)
  - Gordon Moore, American computing entrepreneur (d. 2023)
- January 4 – Günter Schabowski, official of the Socialist Unity Party of Germany (d. 2015)
- January 5 – Alexandre Jany, French swimmer and water polo player (d. 2001)
- January 7 – Terry Moore, American actress
- January 8 – Saeed Jaffrey, Indian-born actor (d. 2015)
- January 9 – Brian Friel, Irish dramatist (d. 2015)
- January 11
  - Nureddin al-Atassi, Syrian philatelist, 54th Prime Minister of Syria and 17th President of Syria (d. 1992)
  - Wanda Wiłkomirska, Polish violinist and teacher (d. 2018)
- January 12
  - Jaakko Hintikka, Finnish philosopher and logician (d. 2015)
  - Irena Homola-Skąpska, Polish historian (d. 2017)
  - Alasdair MacIntyre, British-American philosopher (d. 2025)
- January 15 – Martin Luther King Jr., African-American civil rights leader and Nobel laureate (d. 1968)
- January 17
  - Tan Boon Teik, Attorney-General of Singapore (d. 2012)
  - Jacques Plante, Canadian hockey player (d. 1986)
- January 19
  - Edmundo Abaya, Filipino Catholic archbishop (d. 2018)
  - Carl-Ebbe Andersen, Danish rower (d. 2009)
- January 20
  - Jimmy Cobb, American jazz drummer (d. 2020)
  - Masaharu Kawakatsu, Japanese zoologist
- January 23
  - Patriarch Filaret, former Patriarch of the Ukrainian Orthodox Church – Kyiv Patriarchate (d. 2026)
  - John Charles Polanyi, Canadian chemist and Nobel laureate
- January 25 – Benny Golson, American jazz musician (d. 2024)
- January 26
  - Jules Feiffer, American cartoonist and author (d. 2025)
  - Sumiteru Taniguchi, Japanese anti-nuclear weapons activist (d. 2017)
- January 27
  - Mohamed Al-Fayed, Egyptian business magnate (d. 2023)
  - Hans Berliner, American chess player, writer and professor (d. 2017)
  - Barbara York Main, Australian arachnologist and adjunct professor (d. 2019)
  - Richard Ottinger, American politician (d. 2026)
- January 28
  - Acker Bilk, English jazz clarinetist (d. 2014)
  - Edith M. Flanigen, American chemist (d. 2026)
  - Ali Mirzaei, Iranian weightlifter (d. 2020)
  - Claes Oldenburg, Swedish-born American sculptor (Clothespin) (d. 2022)
- January 30
  - Isamu Akasaki, Japanese physicist and Nobel laureate (d. 2021)
  - Jacqueline van Maarsen, Dutch writer (d. 2025)
- January 31
  - Rudolf Mössbauer, German physicist and Nobel laureate (d. 2011)
  - Jean Simmons, English-American actress (d. 2010)

=== February ===
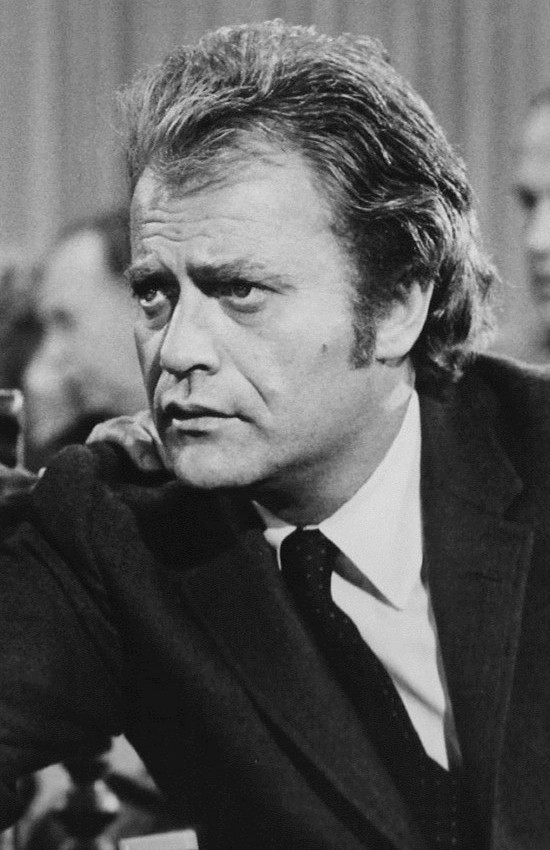
Vic Morrow

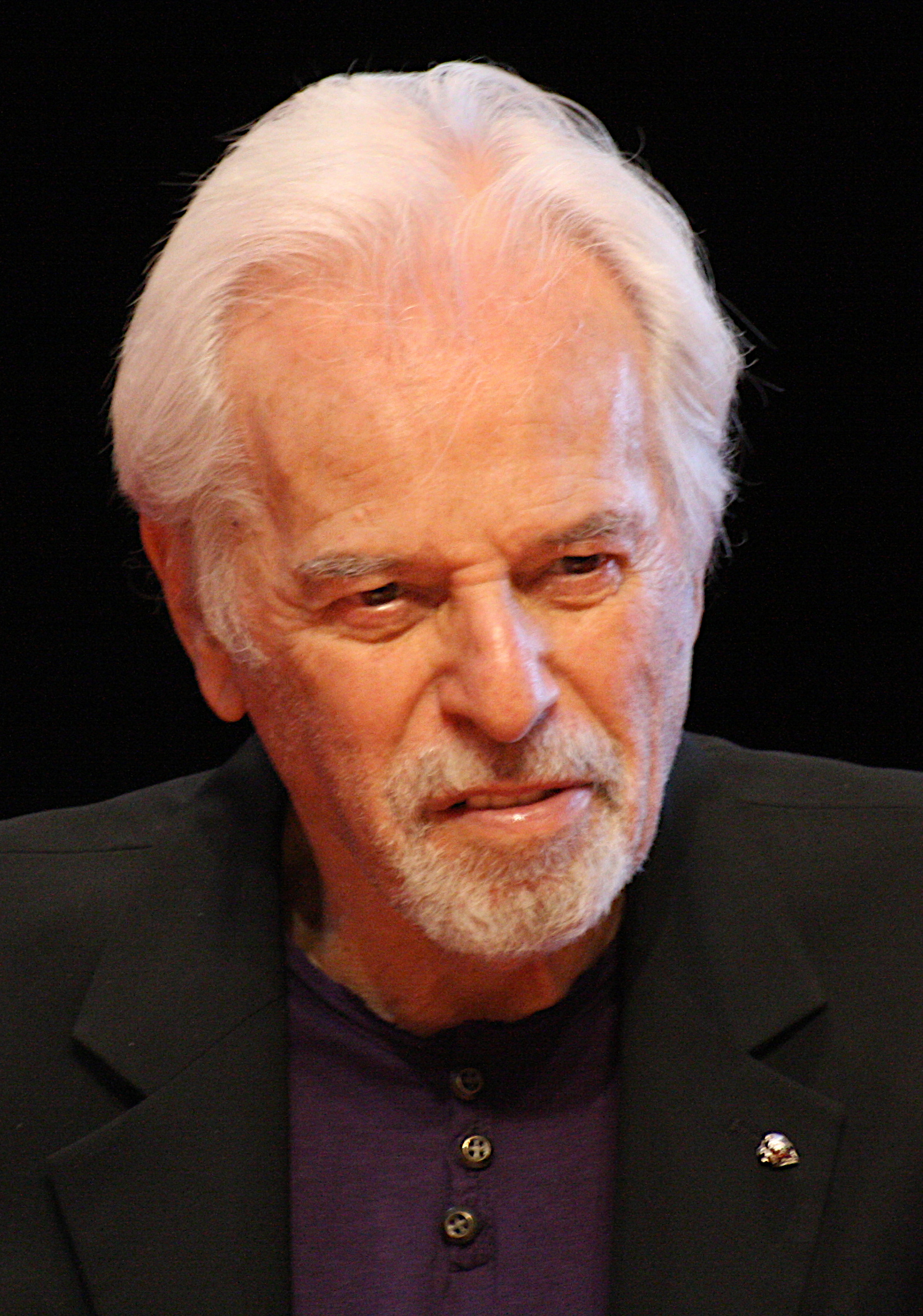
Alejandro Jodorowsky

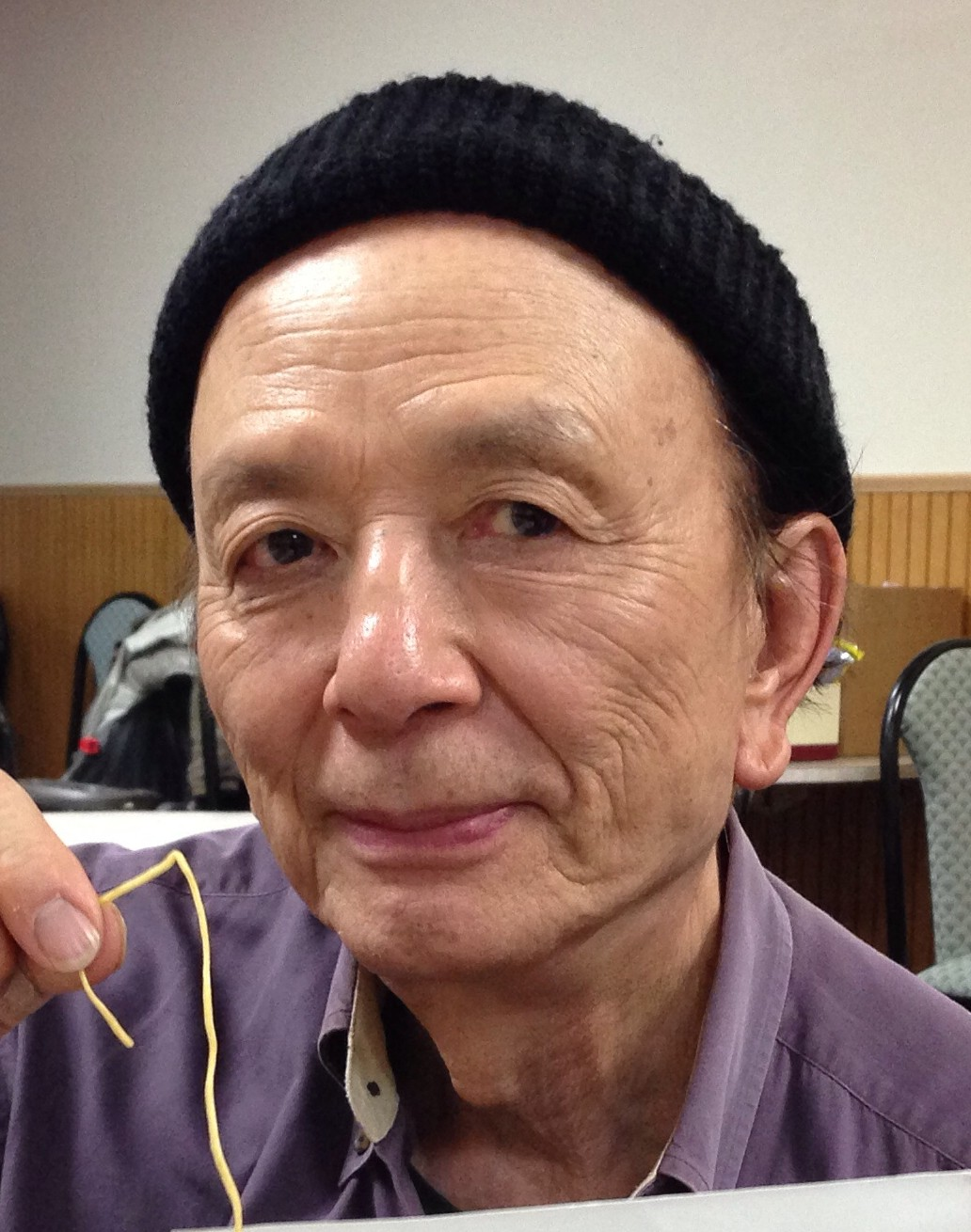
James Hong

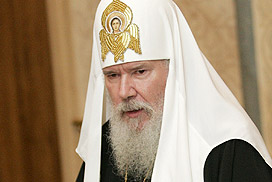
Alexy II

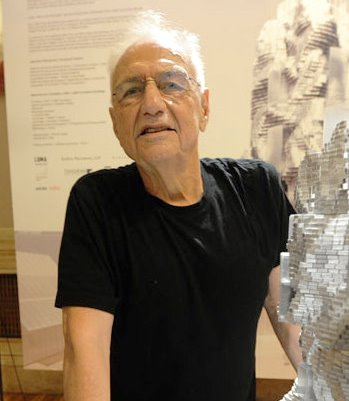
Frank Gehry

- February 1 – Basilio Lami Dozo, Argentine dictator (d. 2017)
- February 2 – Věra Chytilová, Czech director (d. 2014)
- February 5
  - Hal Blaine, American drummer and session musician (d. 2019)
  - Luc Ferrari, French composer (d. 2005)
  - Fred Sinowatz, 18th Chancellor of Austria (d. 2008)
- February 6 – Sixten Jernberg, Swedish Olympic cross-country skier (d. 2012)
- February 10
  - Hallgeir Brenden, Norwegian Olympic cross-country skier (d. 2007)
  - Jerry Goldsmith, American composer and conductor (d. 2004)
- February 11 – Gunvor Pontén, Swedish actress (d. 2023)
- February 14 – Vic Morrow, American actor and director (d. 1982)
- February 15
  - Graham Hill, English racing driver (d. 1975)
  - Kauko Armas Nieminen, Finnish physicist (d. 2010)
  - Ibrahim Abu-Lughod, Palestinian academic (d. 2001)
  - James Schlesinger, American politician (d. 2014)
- February 16 – Kazimierz Kutz, Polish film director and politician (d. 2018)
- February 17
  - Paul Meger, Canadian ice hockey player (d. 2019)
  - Alejandro Jodorowsky, Chilean-French director and screenwriter
  - Patricia Routledge, English actress and singer (d. 2025)
- February 18 – Len Deighton, British author (d. 2026)
- February 21 – Chespirito (Roberto Gómez Bolaños), Mexican actor and comedian (d. 2014)
- February 22
  - James Hong, Chinese American actor and director
  - Miloš Radulović, President of Yugoslavia (d. 2017)
  - Rebecca Schull, American actress
- February 23 – Patriarch Alexy II of Russia (d. 2008)
- February 24
  - Zdzisław Beksiński, Polish surrealist painter (d. 2005)
  - Modesta Lavana, Mexican healer and activist for indigenous rights in Hueyapan (d. 2010)
- February 28
  - Frank Gehry, Canadian-born American architect (d. 2025)
  - Rangaswamy Srinivasan, Indian-American physical chemist and inventor

=== March ===
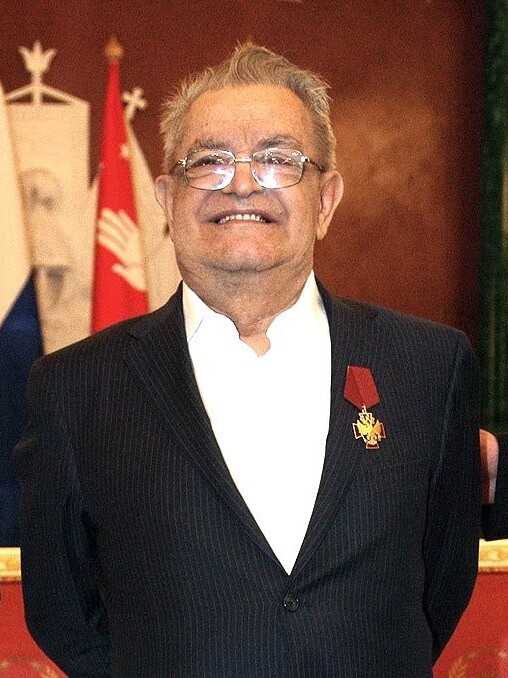
Fazil Iskander

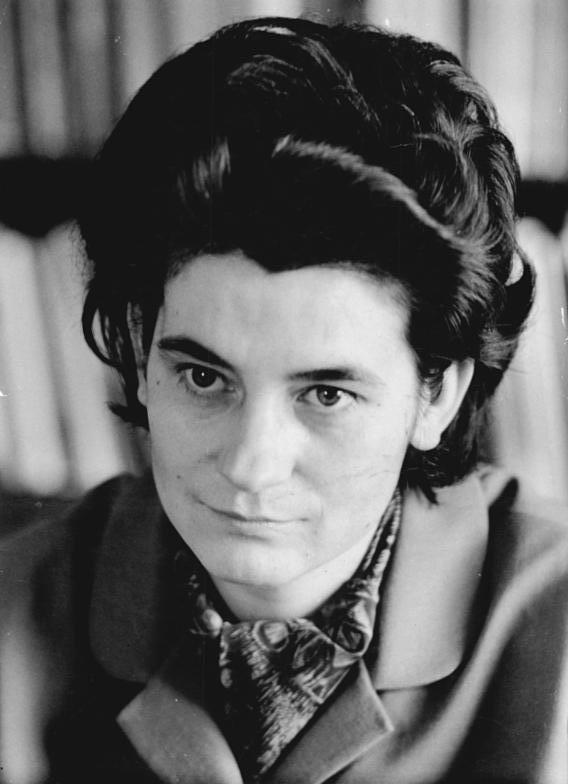
Christa Wolf

- March 1 – Georgi Markov, Bulgarian dissident (d. 1978)
- March 4
  - Columba Domínguez, Mexican actress (d. 2014)
  - Cyril Robinson, English footballer (d. 2019)
  - Bernard Haitink, Dutch conductor (d. 2021)
- March 6
  - Fazil Iskander, Abkhaz writer (d. 2016)
  - Ho Dam, North Korean politician (d. 1991)
  - Günter Kunert, German writer (d. 2019)
- March 8 – Hebe Camargo, Brazilian television presenter, actress and singer (d. 2012)
- March 9
  - Desmond Hoyte, 3rd Prime Minister of Guyana, 4th President of Guyana (d. 2002)
  - Zillur Rahman, President of Bangladesh (d. 2013)
- March 10 – Lolita Rodrigues, Brazilian actress and presenter (d. 2023)
- March 13 – Paek Nam-sun, North Korean Minister of Foreign Affairs (d. 2007)
- March 15 – Cecil Taylor, African-American jazz pianist, composer, and poet (d. 2018)
- March 16
  - Gennady Bukharin, Soviet Olympic canoeist (d. 2020)
  - Nadja Tiller, Austrian actress (d. 2023)
- March 18 – Christa Wolf, German literary critic, novelist, and essayist (d. 2011)
- March 22
  - Yayoi Kusama, Japanese contemporary artist (d. 2026)
  - P. Ramlee, Malaysian film actor, director, singer, songwriter, composer, and producer (d. 1973)
- March 23 – Sir Roger Bannister, British athlete (d. 2018)
- March 29
  - Richard Lewontin, American biologist, geneticist and academic (d. 2021)
  - Lennart Meri, President of Estonia (d. 2006)
  - Olga Tass, Hungarian Olympic gymnast (d. 2020)

=== April ===
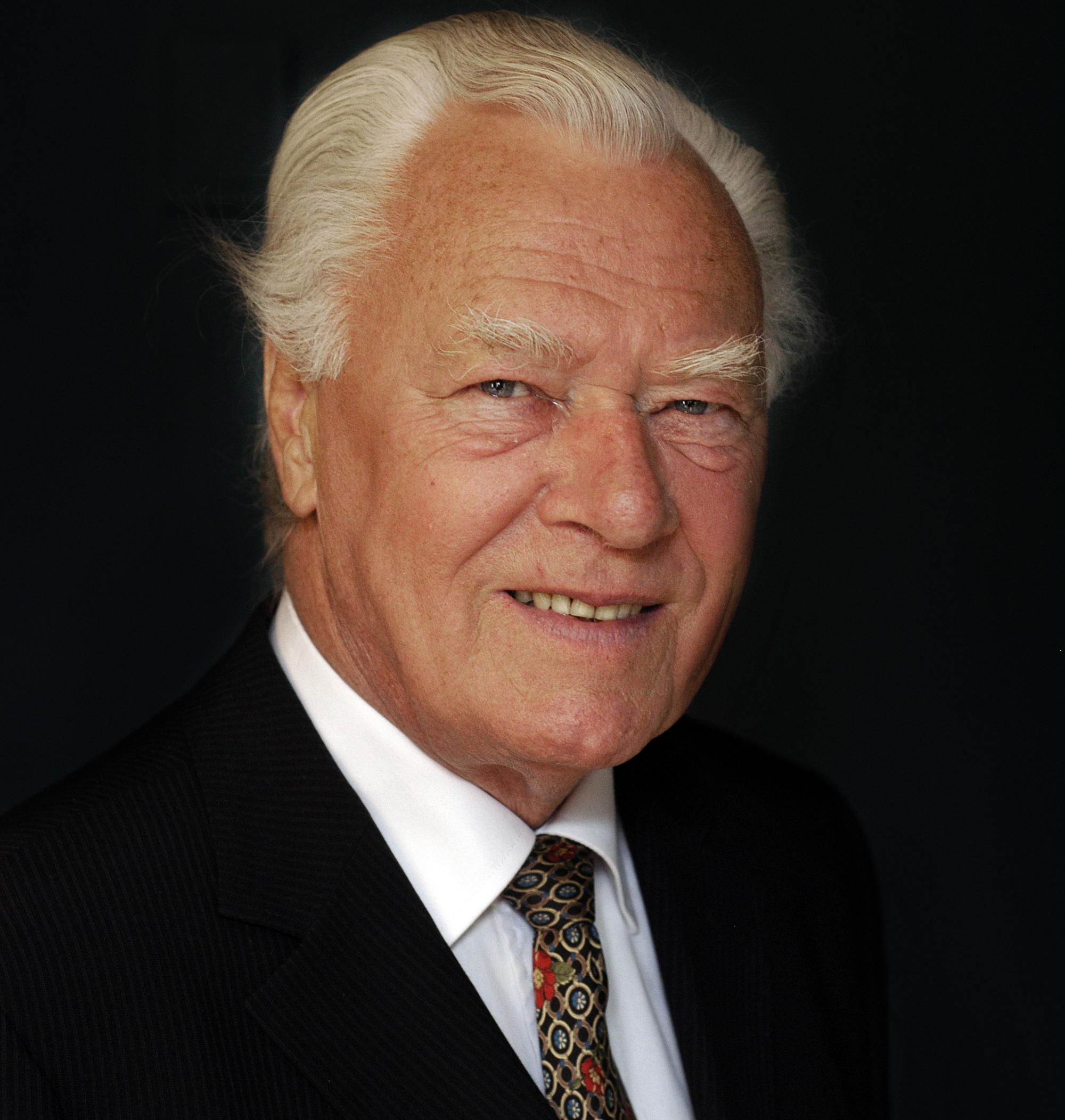
Poul Schlüter

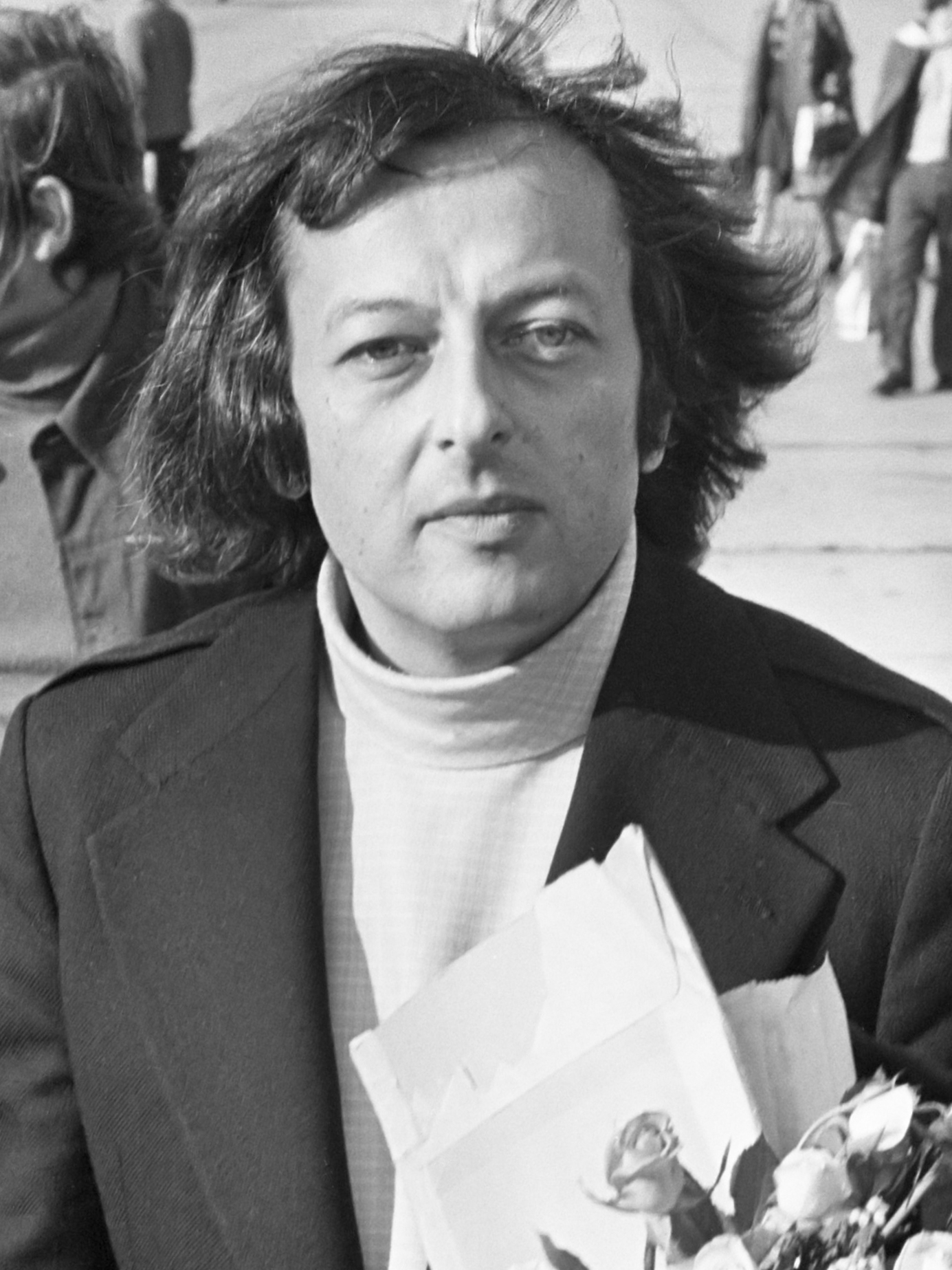
André Previn

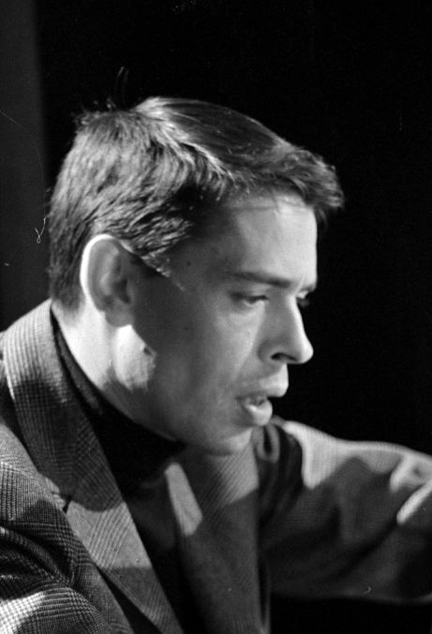
Jacques Brel

- April 1 – Milan Kundera, Czech writer (d. 2023)
- April 3 – Poul Schlüter, Danish politician (d. 2021)
- April 5
  - Lucina da Costa Gomez-Matheeuws, Dutch Antillean politician (d. 2017)
  - Ivar Giaever, Norwegian physicist and Nobel Prize laureate (d. 2025)
  - Nigel Hawthorne, English actor (d. 2001)
  - Joe Meek, English record producer, sound engineer, and songwriter (d. 1967)
- April 6
  - André Previn, German-American pianist, conductor and composer (d. 2019)
  - Christos Sartzetakis, Greek politician (d. 2022)
- April 7 – Madavoor Vasudevan Nair, Indian Kathakali dancer (d. 2018)
- April 8 – Jacques Brel, Belgian singer (d. 1978)
- April 9 – Fred Hollows, New Zealand-Australian ophthalmologist (d. 1993)
- April 10
  - Duje Bonačić, Croatian rower (d. 2020)
  - Mike Hawthorn, British racing driver (d. 1959)
  - Max von Sydow, Swedish actor (d. 2020)
- April 13 – Yvonne Clark, American engineer (d. 2019)
- April 14
  - Gerry Anderson, English television, film producer, director and writer, (Thunderbirds) (d. 2012)
  - Paavo Berglund, Finnish conductor, violinist (d. 2012)
  - Chadli Bendjedid, 3rd President of Algeria (d. 2012)
- April 16 – Roy Hamilton, American singer (d. 1969)
- April 17 – James Last, German composer and bandleader (d. 2015)
- April 21
  - Estrella Zeledón Lizano, Costa Rican politician, First Lady (d. 2019)
  - Bevin Hough, New Zealand sportsman (d. 2019)
- April 22
  - Michael Atiyah, British-Lebanese mathematician (d. 2019)
  - John Nicks, English figure skater and skating coach (d. 2026)
- April 24
  - Shammi, Indian actress (d. 2018)
  - Rajkumar, Indian actor and singer (d. 2006)
- April 25 – Abderrahmane Mahjoub, French and Moroccan international football (soccer) midfielder (d. 2011)
- April 26 – Alexandre Lamfalussy, Hungarian-Belgian economist and central banker (d. 2015)
- April 28 – Evangelina Elizondo, Mexican actress (d. 2017)
- April 30 – Klausjürgen Wussow, German actor (d. 2007)

=== May ===
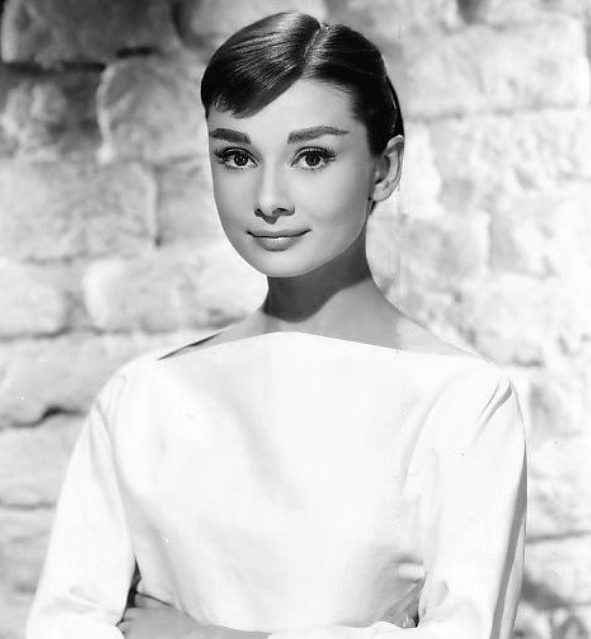
Audrey Hepburn

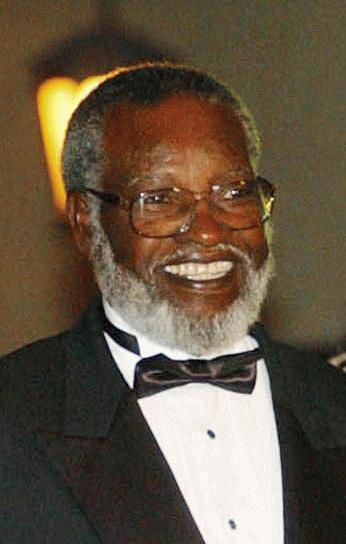
Sam Nujoma

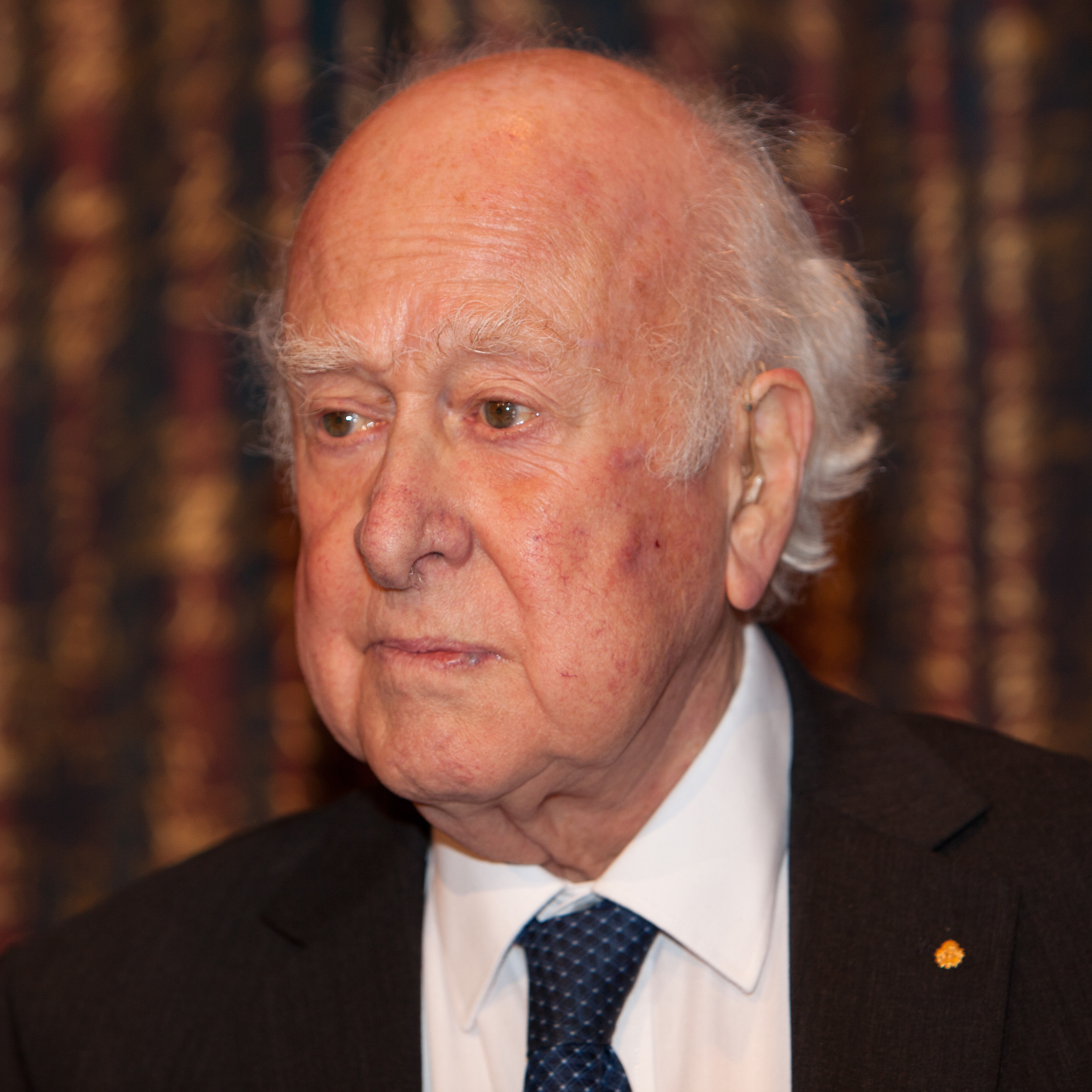
Peter Higgs

- May 1 – Ralf Dahrendorf, Anglo-German sociologist (d. 2009)
- May 2
  - Eddie Garcia, Filipino actor and director (d. 2019)
  - Link Wray, American rock and roll musician (d. 2005)
  - Édouard Balladur, 91st Prime Minister of France (d. 2026)
- May 3 – Per-Ingvar Brånemark, Swedish physician, "father of modern dental implantology" (d. 2014)
- May 4
  - Ronald Golias, Brazilian comedian and actor (d. 2005)
  - Audrey Hepburn, Belgian-born British actress and activist (d. 1993)
- May 5 – Ilene Woods, American singer, actress (d. 2010)
- May 6 – Paul Lauterbur, American chemist and Nobel laureate (d. 2007)
- May 8
  - Girija Devi, Indian classical singer (d. 2017)
  - Miyoshi Umeki, Japanese singer, actress (d. 2007)
- May 12
  - Ágnes Heller, Hungarian philosopher (d. 2019)
  - Sam Nujoma, 1st President of Namibia (d. 2025)
- May 13 – Ângela Maria, Brazilian singer and actress (d. 2018)
- May 15 – Otar Patsatsia, Georgian politician (d. 2021)
- May 16
  - Betty Carter, African-American jazz singer (d. 1998)
  - Adrienne Rich, American poet and essayist (d. 2012)
- May 25 – Beverly Sills, American operatic soprano, director of the New York City Opera (d. 2007)
- May 29 – Peter Higgs, British theoretical physicist and Nobel Prize laureate (d. 2024)
- May 30 – Doina Cornea, Romanian human rights activist, professor (d. 2018)
- May 31
  - Joseph Bernardo, French Olympic swimmer (d. 2023)
  - Menahem Golan, Israeli director and producer (d. 2014)

=== June ===
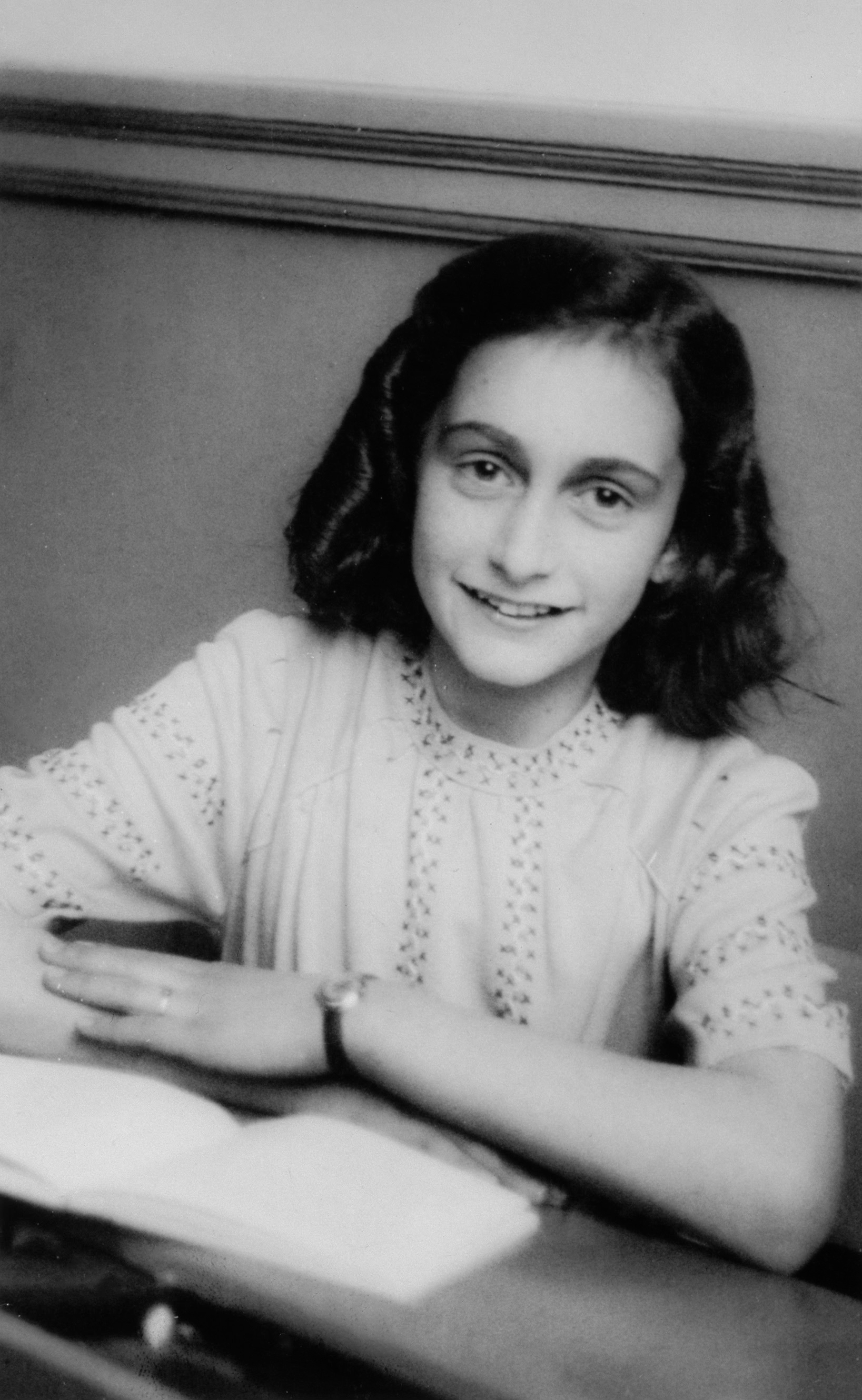
Anne Frank

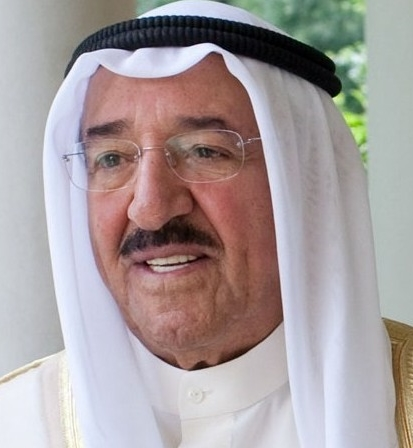
Sabah Al-Ahmad Al-Jaber Al-Sabah

- June 3 – Werner Arber, Swiss microbiologist and Nobel laureate
- June 4
  - Rolf Leeser, Dutch footballer and fashion designer (d. 2018)
  - Karolos Papoulias, President of Greece (d. 2021)
- June 6
  - Sunil Dutt, Hindi film actor (d. 2005)
  - Albert Kalonji, Congolese politician (d. 2015)
- June 7 – John Turner, 17th Prime Minister of Canada (d. 2020)
- June 8 – Gastone Moschin, Italian actor (d. 2017)
- June 10
  - Ian Sinclair, Australian politician
  - E. O. Wilson, American biologist (d. 2021)
  - James McDivitt, American astronaut (d. 2022)
- June 12 – Anne Frank, German-born diarist, Holocaust victim (d. 1945)
- June 13 – Kurt Equiluz, Austrian opera singer (d. 2022)
- June 16 – Sabah Al-Ahmad Al-Jaber Al-Sabah, Emir of Kuwait (d. 2020)
- June 18 – Jürgen Habermas, German sociologist and philosopher (d. 2026)
- June 21 – Ramón Luis Rivera, Puerto Rican politician (d. 2026)
- June 23
  - June Carter Cash, American singer (d. 2003)
  - Mario Ghella, Italian racing cyclist (d. 2020)
  - Claude Goretta, Swiss television producer, film director (d. 2019)
- June 24
  - Carolyn S. Shoemaker, American astronomer (d. 2021)
  - Yaakov Agmon, Israeli theatre producer, manager, and director (d. 2020)
- June 25
  - Eric Carle, American designer, illustrator, and writer (d. 2021)
  - Benny Schmidt, Danish modern pentathlete (d. 2025)
- June 26 – Milton Glaser, American graphic designer, illustrator and teacher (d. 2020)
- June 27
  - H. Ian Macdonald, Canadian economist and civil servant
  - Gennady Osipov, Russian scientist, sociologist and philosopher
- June 28 – Alfred Miodowicz, Polish politician (d. 2021)
- June 29
  - Pat Crawford Brown, American actress (d. 2019)
  - Pete George, American weightlifter (d. 2021)
  - Lalla Fatima Zohra, Moroccan aristocrat (d. 2014)

=== July ===
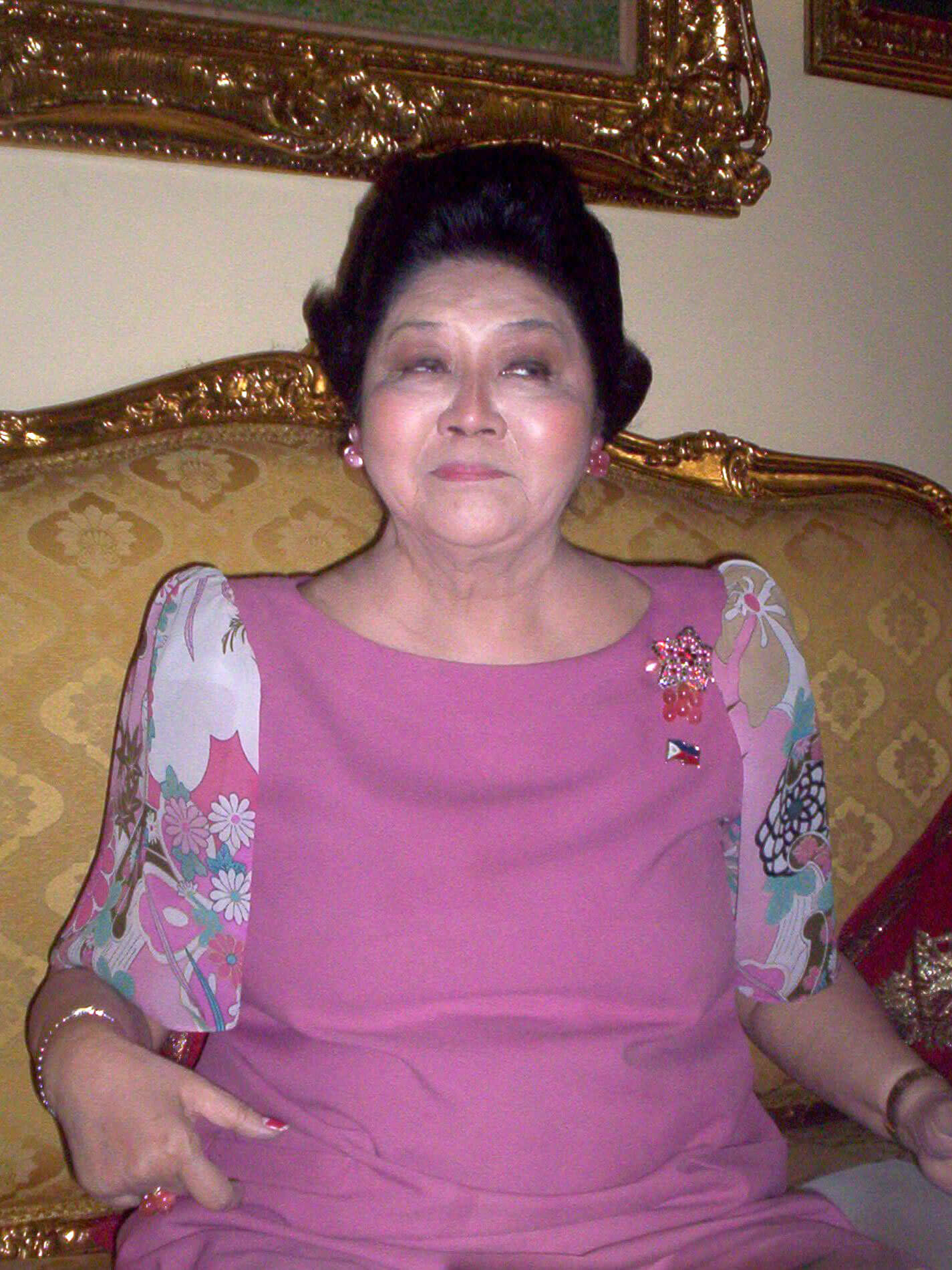
Imelda Marcos

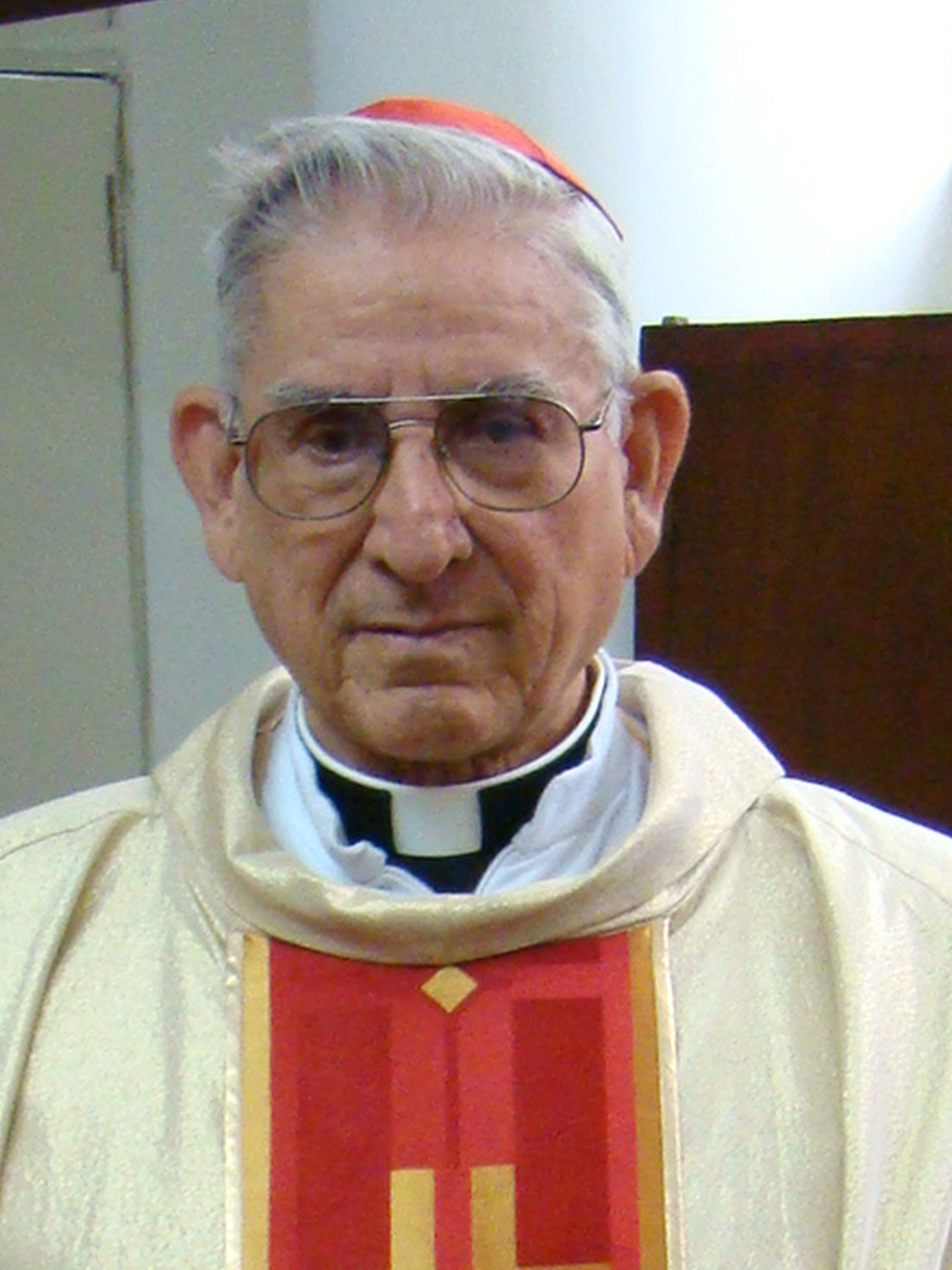
Darío Castrillón Hoyos

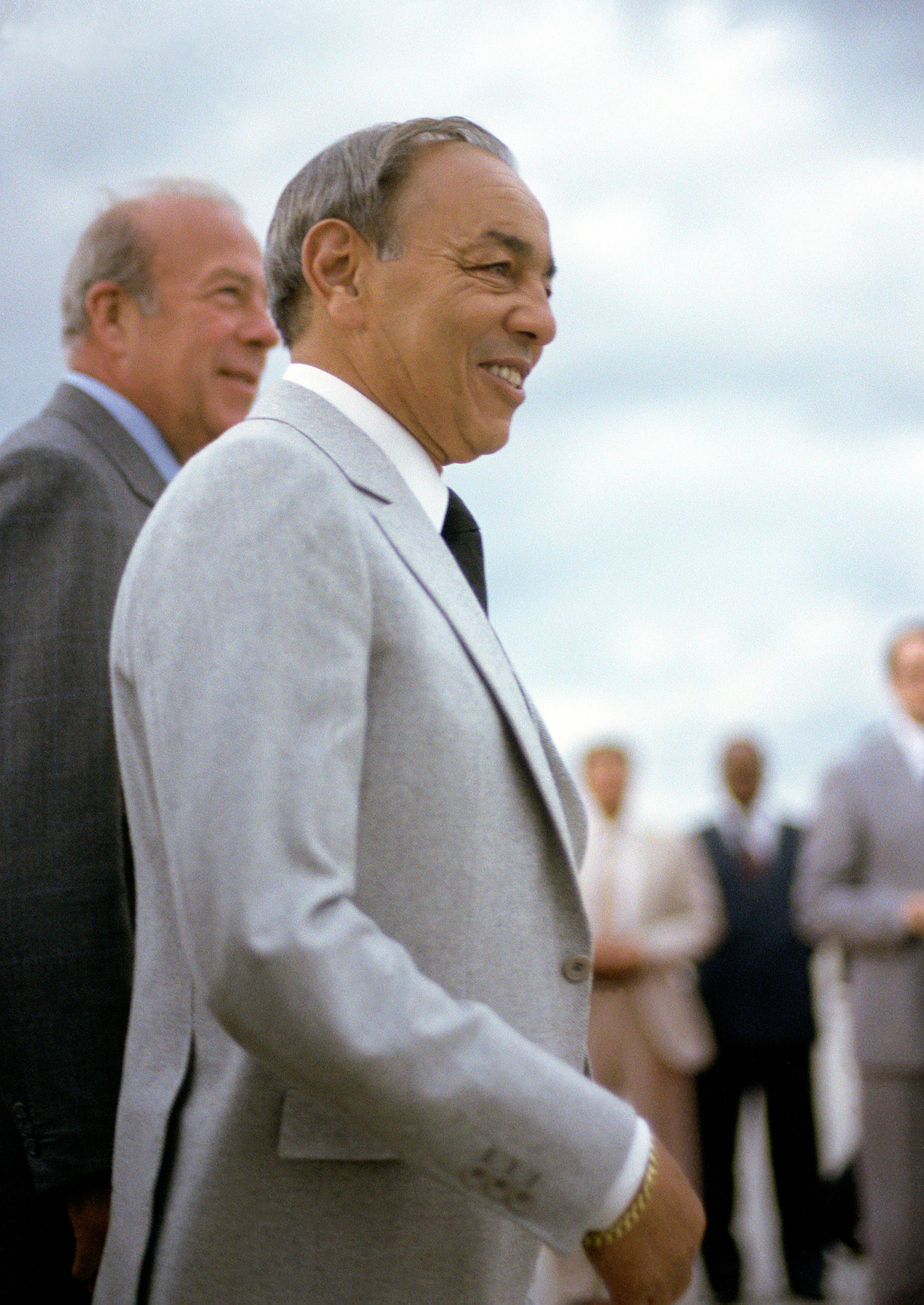
Hassan II of Morocco

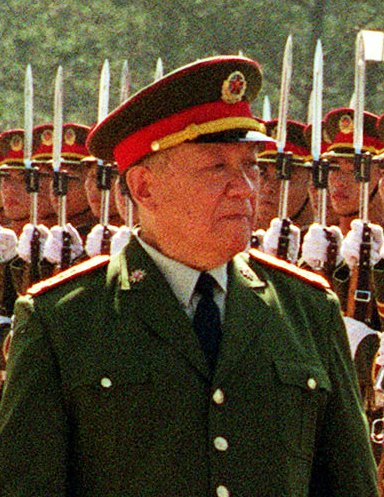
Chi Haotian

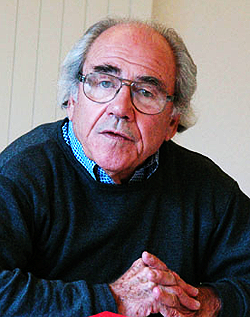
Jean Baudrillard

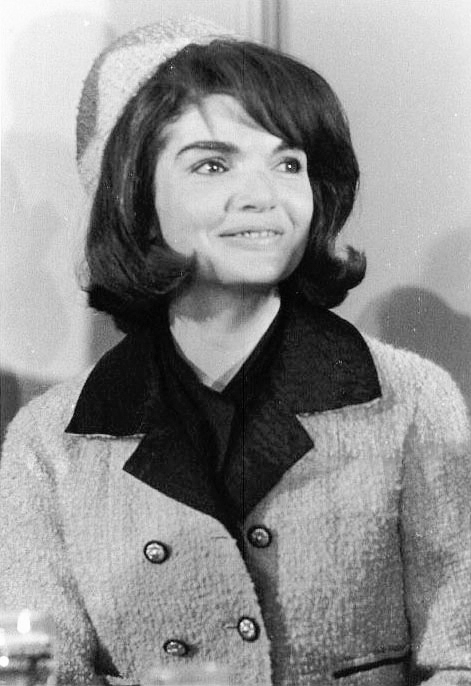
Jacqueline Kennedy Onassis

- July 1
  - Gerald Edelman, American biologist and Nobel laureate (d. 2014)
  - Jack Storey, Australian rules footballer
- July 2
  - Daphne Hasenjäger, South African athlete
  - Imelda Marcos, former First Lady of the Philippines
- July 5
  - Chikao Ōtsuka, Japanese actor, voice actor and father of Akio Ōtsuka (d. 2015)
  - Katherine Helmond, American actress (d. 2019)
  - Thérèse Quentin, French actress (d. 2015)
- July 6 – Hélène Carrère d'Encausse, secretary of the Académie française, historian specializing in Russian history (d. 2023)
- July 7 – Sergio Romano, Italian writer, journalist, and historian
- July 9
  - Elon Lages Lima, Brazilian mathematician (d. 2017)
  - King Hassan II of Morocco (d. 1999)
  - Chi Haotian, Chinese general
  - Patricia Kenner, American politician and registered nurse (d. 2013
- July 13 – Sofia Muratova, Soviet artistic gymnast (d. 2006)
- July 14
  - Sonja Kastl, Croatian film and stage actress, teacher, dancer and choreographer
  - Kailash Chandra Joshi, Indian politician (d. 2019)
- July 17
  - Sergei K. Godunov, Russian mathematician, academic (d. 2023)
  - Arthur Frommer, American writer, publisher and consumer advocate (d. 2024)
  - Vasco Modena, Italian racing cyclist (d. 2016)
- July 18 – Dick Button, American figure skater (d. 2025)
- July 19
  - Emmanuel Le Roy Ladurie, French historian (d. 2023)
  - Ronald Melzack, Canadian physiologist and professor (d. 2019)
  - Orville Turnquest, Bahamian politician
- July 21
  - Birger Asplund, Swedish hammer thrower (d. 2023)
  - Idrissa Dione, French boxer
  - Albert Kwesi Ocran, Ghanaian soldier, politician (d. 2019)
- July 22 – Midhat J. Gazalé, French international telecommunications, space consultant (d. 2009)
- July 24
  - Peter Yates, English film director and producer (d. 2011)
  - Paolo Paoloni, Italian actor (d. 2019)
- July 25
  - Vasily Shukshin, Russian actor, writer, screenwriter and film director (d. 1974)
  - Somnath Chatterjee, Indian politician (d. 2018)
- July 27
  - Jean Baudrillard, French sociologist, philosopher, cultural theorist and political commentator (d. 2007)
  - Jack Higgins, British novelist (d. 2022)
- July 28 – Jacqueline Kennedy Onassis, First Lady of the United States (d. 1994)
- July 31
  - Don Murray, American actor (d. 2024)
  - Lynne Reid Banks, British author of books for adults and children (d. 2024)

=== August ===
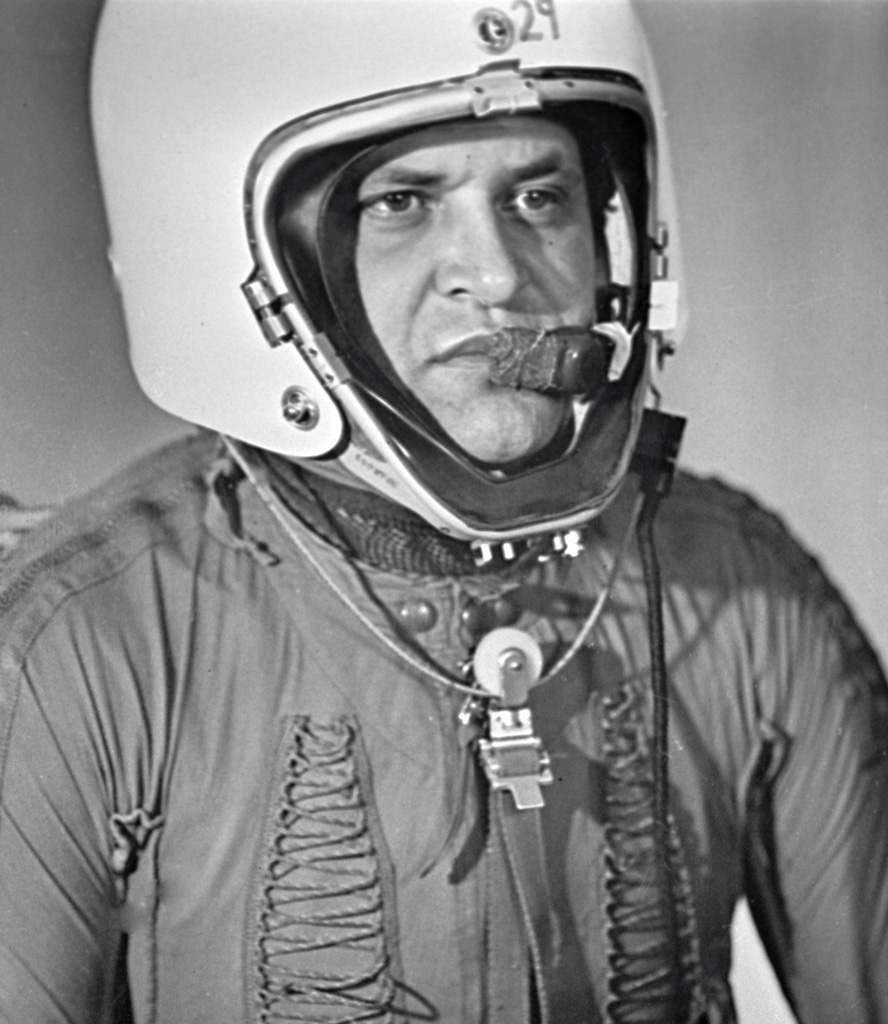
Francis Gary Powers

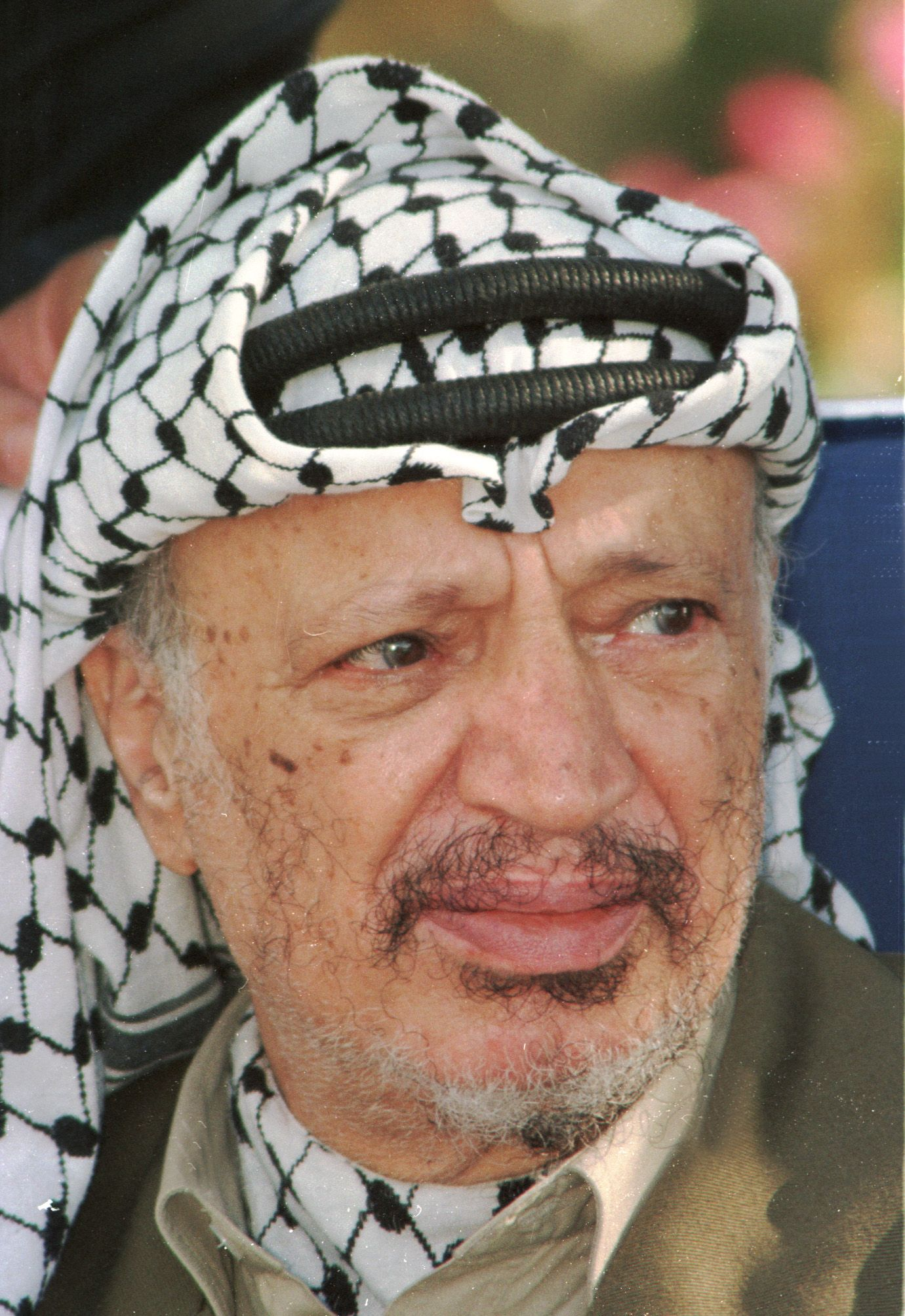
Yasser Arafat

- August 1
  - Flerida Ruth Pineda-Romero, Filipino judge (d. 2017)
  - Hafizullah Amin, Afghan politician and statesman (d. 1979)
- August 2 – José Afonso, Portuguese singer-songwriter, teacher and activist (d. 1987)
- August 5
  - Ottó Boros, Hungarian water polo player (d. 1988)
  - Nathalia Timberg, Brazilian actress
- August 8
  - Ronnie Biggs, British criminal (d. 2013)
  - Luis García Meza, 57th president of Bolivia (d. 2018)
  - Sabri Godo, Albanian writer and politician (d. 2011)
- August 15
  - Carlo Ripa di Meana, Italian politician (d. 2018)
  - Evelyn Y. Davis, American activist shareholder (d. 2018)
- August 17 – Francis Gary Powers, American U-2 spy plane pilot (d. 1977)
- August 21 – Ahmed Kathrada, South African politician, political prisoner and anti-apartheid activist (d. 2017)
- August 23
  - Zoltán Czibor, Hungarian footballer (d. 1997)
  - Peter Thomson, Australian golfer (d. 2018)
- August 24 – Yasser Arafat, Palestinian leader, Nobel laureate (d. 2004)
- August 29 – Alice Recoque, French computer scientist, computer engineer and computer architecture specialist (d. 2021)

=== September ===
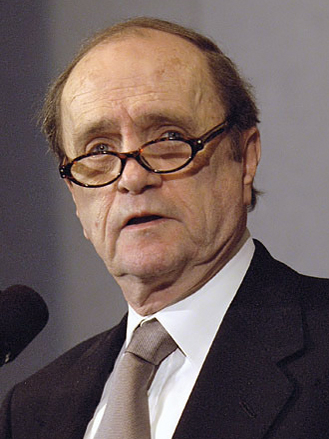
Bob Newhart

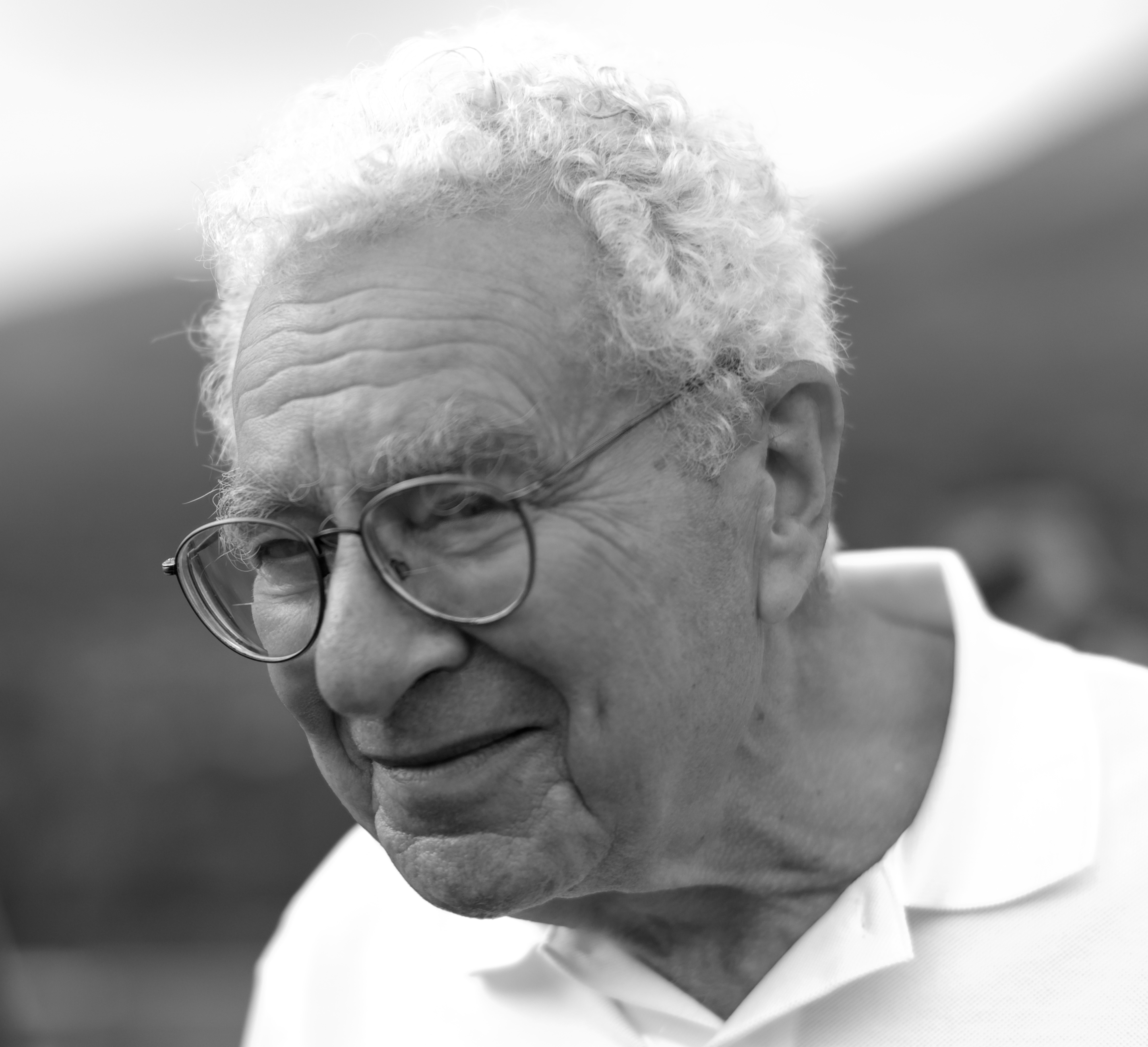
Murray Gell-Mann

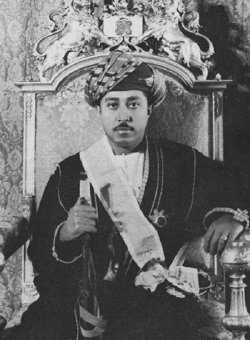
Jamshid bin Abdullah

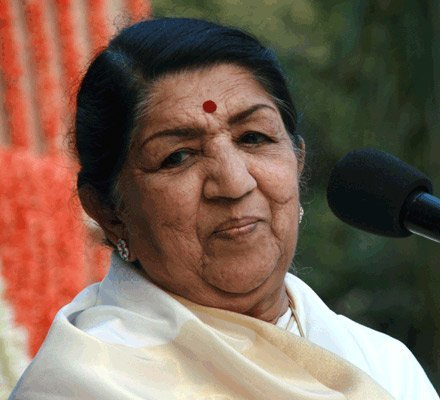
Lata Mangeshkar

- September 1
  - "Mad Dog" Vachon, Canadian professional wrestler (d. 2013)
  - Květa Fialová, Czech actress (d. 2017)
- September 3
  - Whitey Bulger, American mob boss (d. 2018)
  - Armand Vaillancourt, Québécois Canadian sculptor, painter and performance artist
  - Irene Papas, Greek actress and singer (d. 2022)
- September 5 – Bob Newhart, American comedian and actor (d. 2024)
- September 10 – Arnold Palmer, American golfer (d. 2016)
- September 15
  - John Julius Norwich, British historian, travel writer and television personality (d. 2018)
  - Murray Gell-Mann, American physicist and Nobel laureate (d. 2019)
- September 16
  - Margarita Carrera, Guatemalan philosopher, professor and writer (d. 2018)
  - Jamshid bin Abdullah, last Sultan of Zanzibar (d. 2024)
- September 17 – Stirling Moss, British Formula One racing driver (d. 2020)
- September 18 – Armando, Dutch artist (d. 2018)
- September 19 – Luigi Taveri, Swiss motorcycle road racer (d. 2018)
- September 20 – Anne Meara, American actress and comedian (d. 2015)
- September 21
  - Sándor Kocsis, Hungarian football player (d. 1979)
  - Bernard Williams, English philosopher (d. 2003)
- September 22
  - Hédi Váradi, Hungarian actress (d. 1987)
  - Carlo Ubbiali, Italian motorcycle road racer (d. 2020)
- September 24 – Tunku Abdul Malik, Raja Muda of Kedah (d. 2015)
- September 25
  - Barbara Walters, American journalist (d. 2022)
  - Ronnie Barker, English actor, comedian and writer (d. 2005)
- September 28
  - Lata Mangeshkar, Indian singer (d. 2022)
  - Nikolai Ryzhkov, Soviet and Russian politician (d. 2024)
- September 29 – Giorgio Bàrberi Squarotti, Italian academic, poet (d. 2017)
- September 30 – Mir Hazar Khan Khoso, Prime Minister of Pakistan (d. 2021)

=== October ===
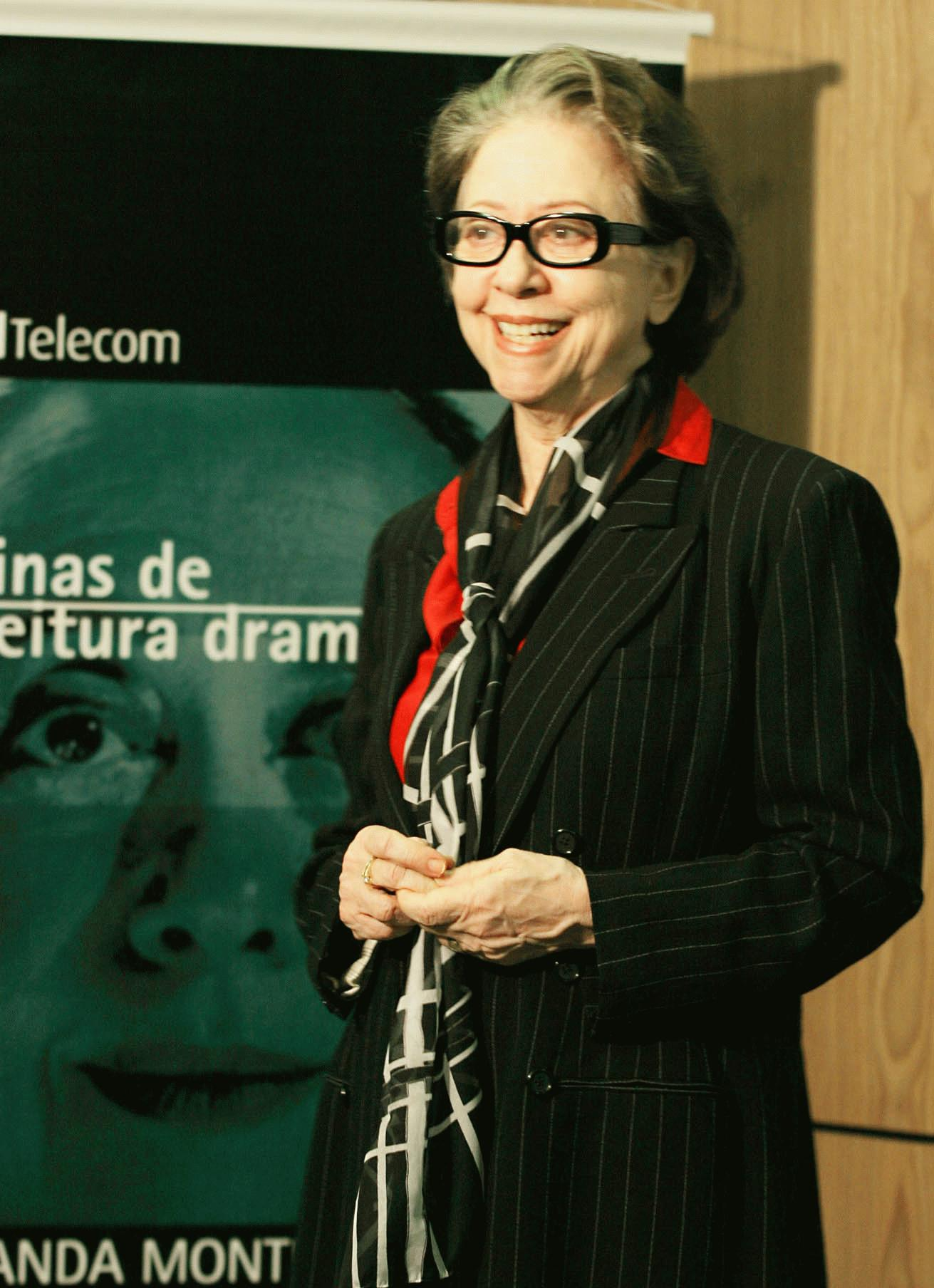
Fernanda Montenegro

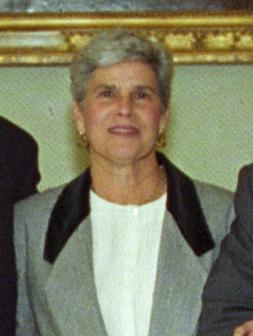
Violeta Chamorro

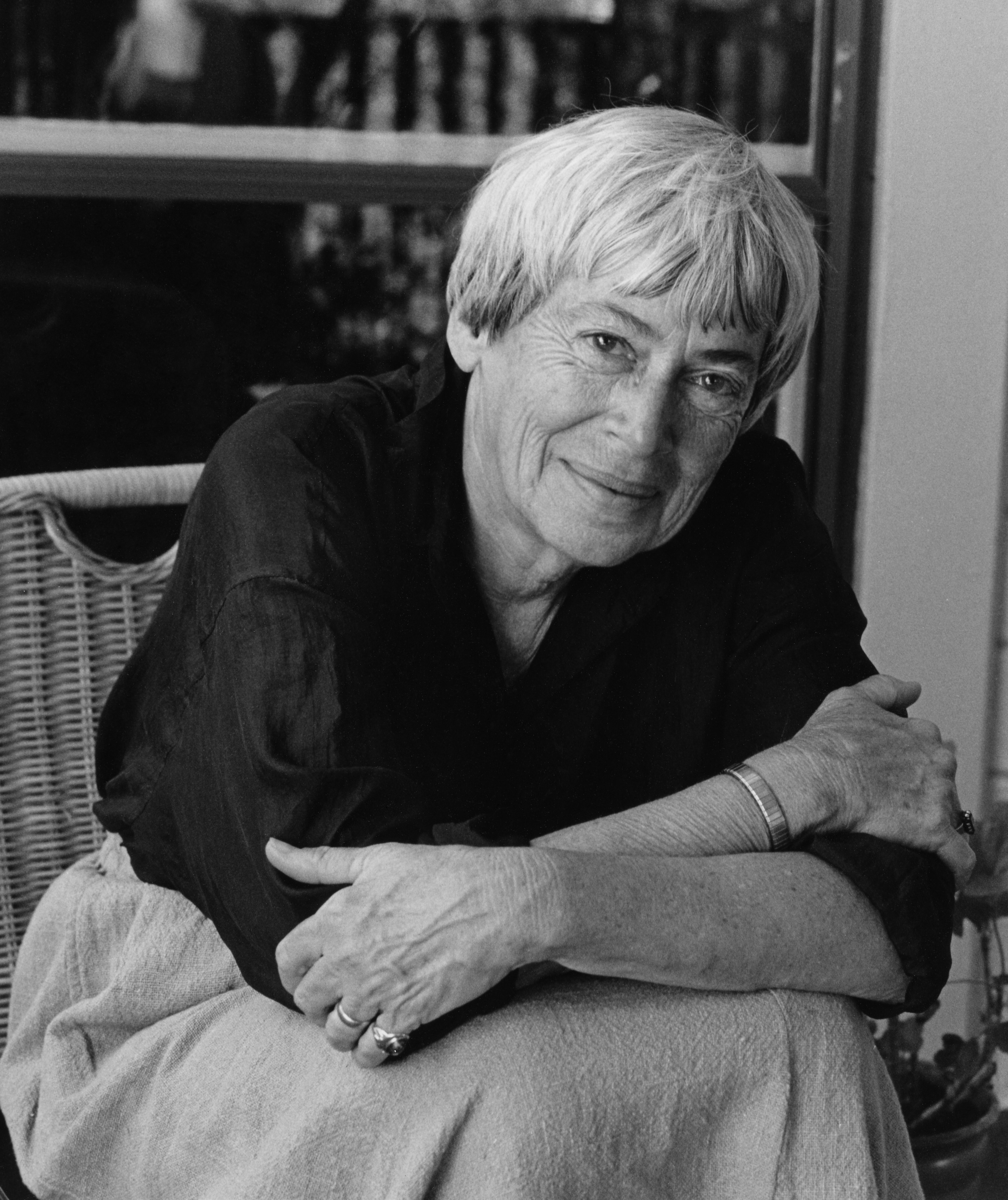
Ursula K. Le Guin

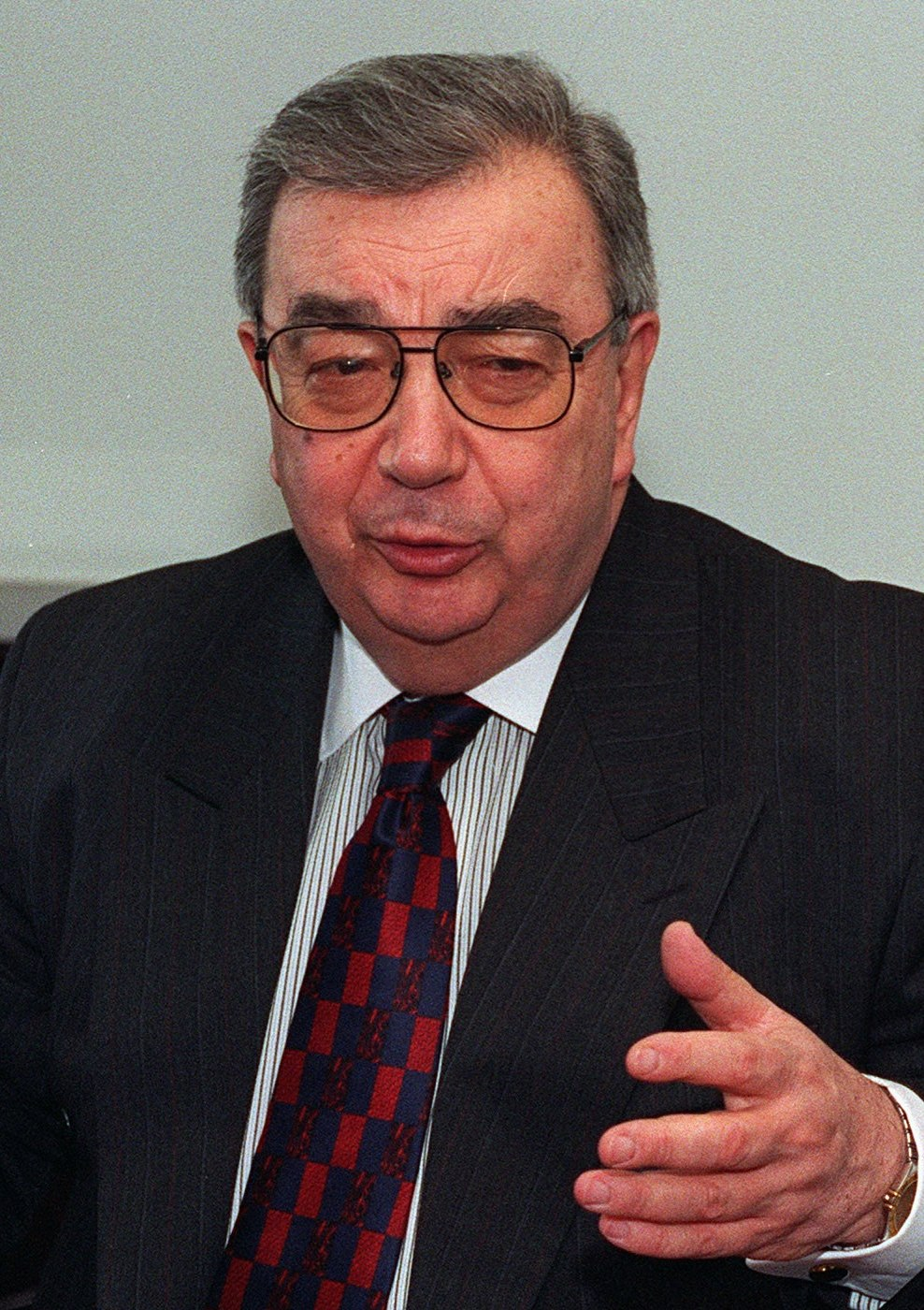
Yevgeny Primakov

- October 2 – Hong Song-nam, 8th Premier of North Korea (d. 2009)
- October 5
  - Yuri Artsutanov, Russian engineer (d. 2019)
  - Richard F. Gordon Jr., American astronaut (d. 2017)
- October 9 – Ana Luisa Peluffo, Mexican actress (d. 2026)
- October 15
  - Hubert Dreyfus, American philosopher (d. 2017)
  - Antonino Zichichi, Italian physicist (d. 2026)
- October 16
  - Michael Jay Williams, Trinidadian politician and Acting President
  - Fernanda Montenegro, Brazilian actress
- October 18 – Violeta Chamorro, President of Nicaragua (d. 2025)
- October 21 – Ursula K. Le Guin, American science-fiction, fantasy author (d. 2018)
- October 22 – Lev Yashin, Russian footballer (d. 1990)
- October 24 – George Crumb, American composer (d. 2022)
- October 25 – Claude Rouer, French Olympic road cyclist (d. 2021)
- October 26 – Yvonne Marie Louise Odette Renée Ménard, French burlesque dancer (d. 2013)
- October 28 – Joan Plowright, English actress (d. 2025)
- October 29 – Yevgeny Primakov, Russian politician, diplomat (d. 2015)
- October 31
  - Bud Spencer, Italian actor (d. 2016)
  - Muktha Srinivasan, Indian film director, producer (d. 2018)

=== November ===
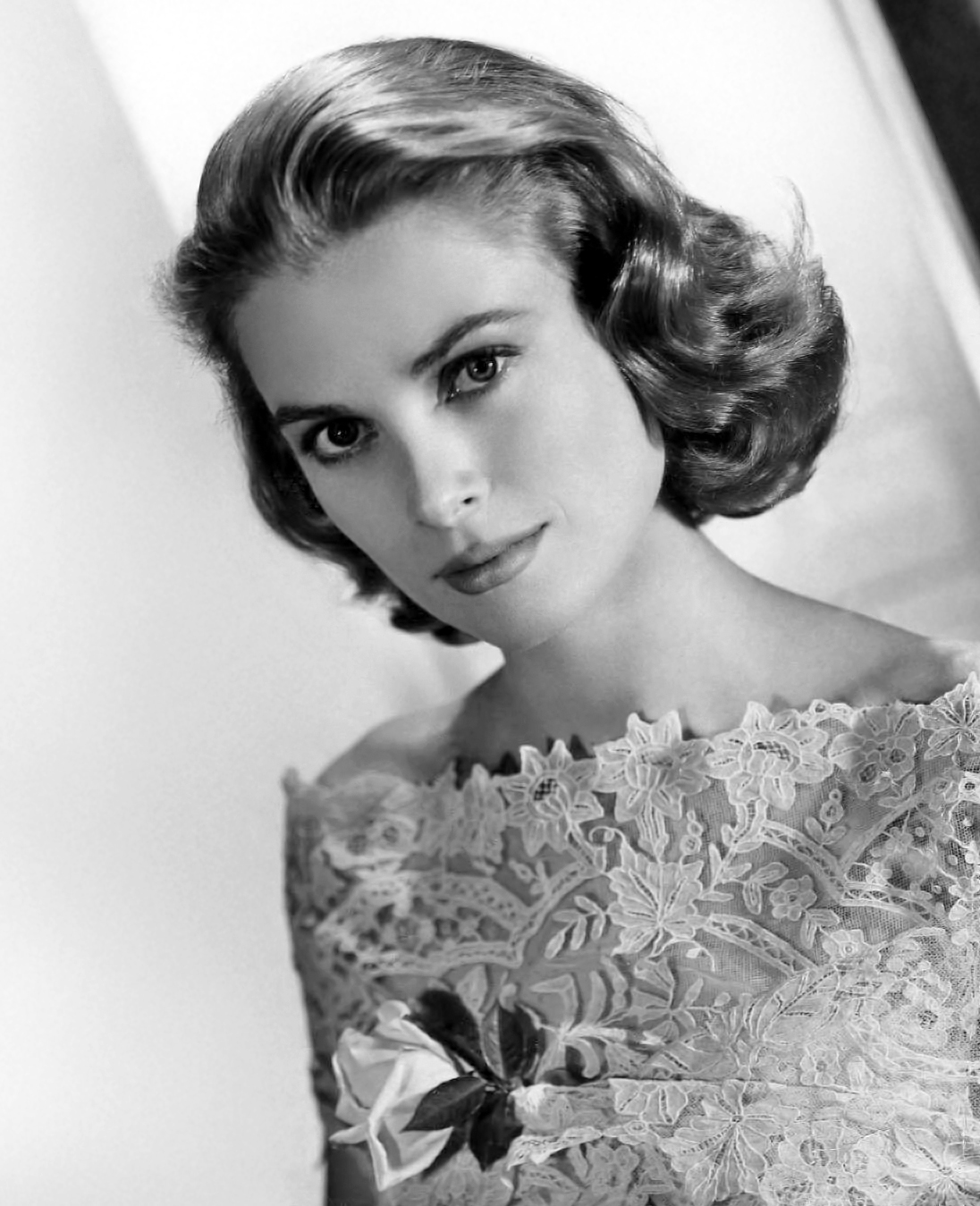
Grace Kelly

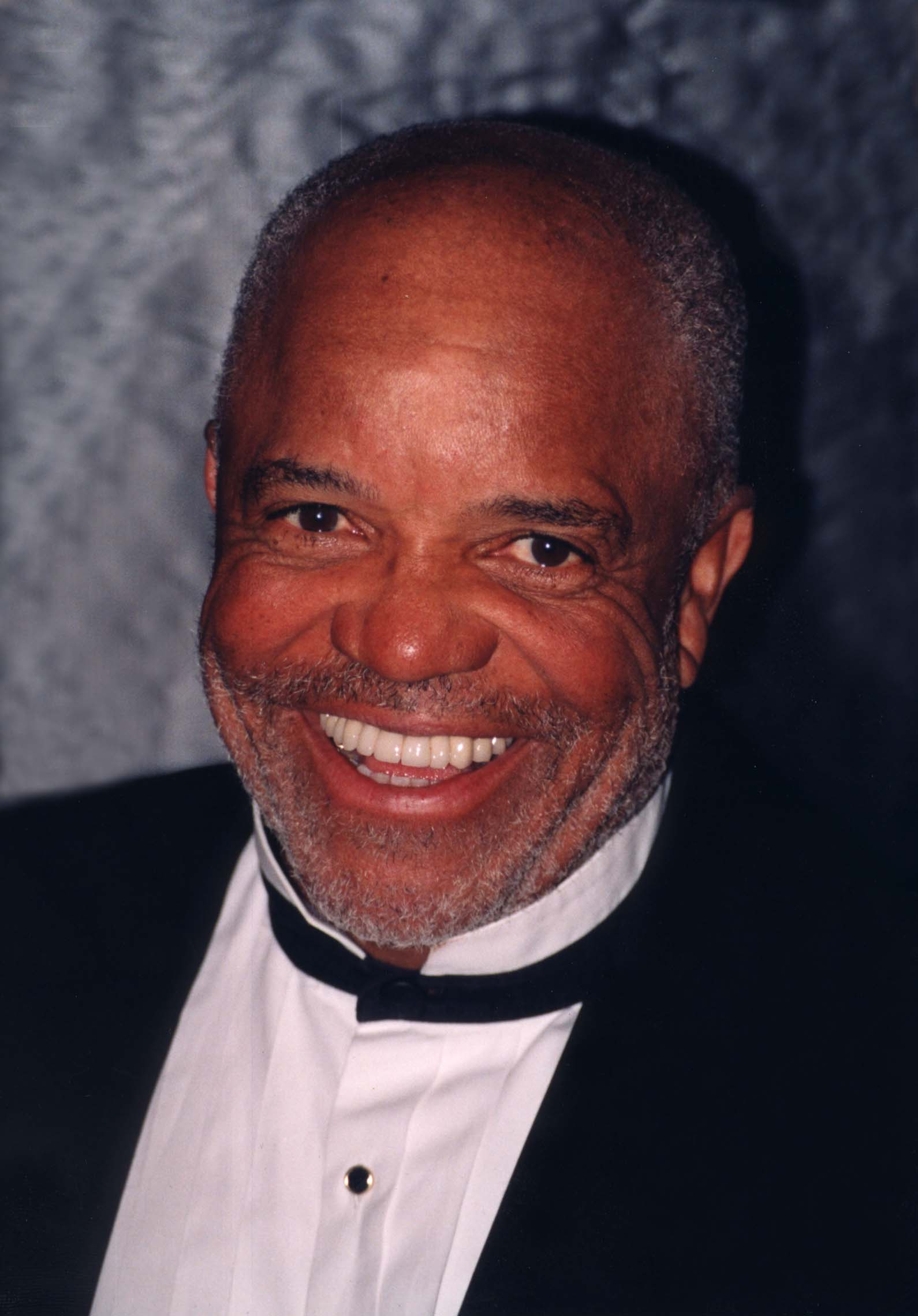
Berry Gordy

- November 2
  - Muhammad Rafiq Tarar, 9th president of Pakistan (d. 2022)
  - Richard E. Taylor, Canadian-born physicist and Nobel laureate (d. 2018)
- November 4 – Anastasios of Albania, Greek-Albanian archbishop (d. 2025)
- November 5 – Lennart Johansson, Swedish sports official and 5th president of UEFA (d. 2019)
- November 6 – June Squibb, American actress
- November 7 – Eric R. Kandel, Austrian-born neuroscientist, Nobel laureate
- November 8 – Jona Senilagakali, Prime Minister of Fiji (d. 2011)
- November 9 – Imre Kertész, Hungarian writer, Nobel laureate (d. 2016)
- November 10 – Ninón Sevilla, Cuban-born Mexican film actress, dancer (d. 2015)
- November 12
  - Grace Kelly, American actress, later Princess of Monaco (d. 1982)
  - Michael Ende, German fantasy writer (d. 1995)
  - Hind Rostom, Egyptian actress (d. 2011)
- November 13 – Fred Phelps, American pastor, activist (Westboro Baptist Church) (d. 2014)
- November 15
  - Ed Asner, American actor (d. 2021)
  - Gombojavyn Ochirbat, Mongolian politician
- November 17 – Gorō Naya, Japanese actor, voice actor, narrator and theatre director, older brother of Rokurō Naya (d. 2013)
- November 18 – Francisco Savín, Mexican conductor, composer (d. 2018)
- November 20 – Raymond Lefèvre, French conductor, arranger, composer (d. 2008)
- November 23 – Karl Svoboda, Austrian politician (d. 2022)
- November 24 – Franciszek Kokot, Polish nephrologist (d. 2021)
- November 28
  - Berry Gordy, African-American record producer, songwriter
  - Thomas Remengesau Sr., 4th president of Palau (d. 2019)
- November 30 – Dick Clark, American television entertainer (d. 2012)

=== December ===
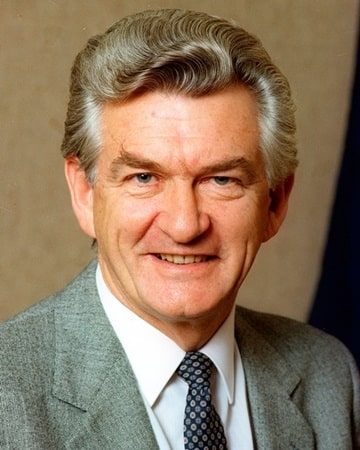
Bob Hawke

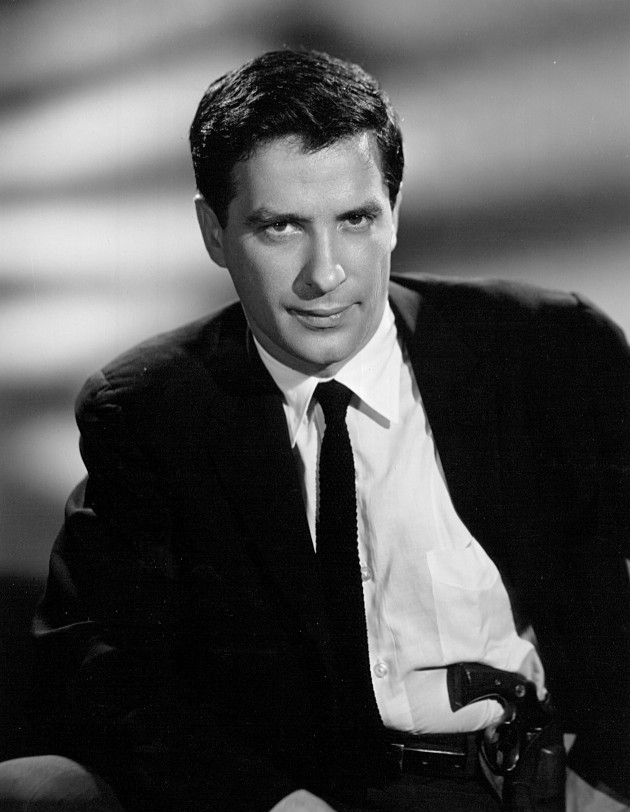
John Cassavetes

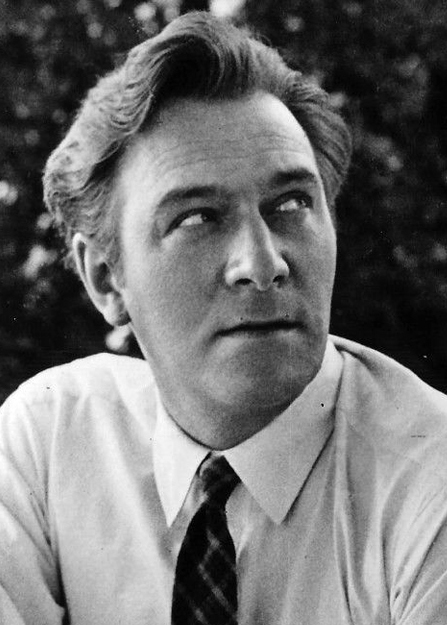
Christopher Plummer

- December 1 – Alfred Moisiu, 7th president of Albania
- December 6
  - Philippe Bouvard, French television and radio presenter (d. 2026)
  - Nikolaus Harnoncourt, Austrian conductor (d. 2016)
  - Alain Tanner, Swiss film director (d. 2022)
- December 8 – Arnulf Rainer, Austrian painter (d. 2025)
- December 9
  - Bob Hawke, 23rd Prime Minister of Australia (d. 2019)
  - John Cassavetes, American actor and director (d. 1989)
- December 12 – Toshiko Akiyoshi, Japanese pianist and composer
- December 13 – Christopher Plummer, Canadian actor (d. 2021)
- December 15 – Dina bint Abdul-Hamid, queen consort of Jordan 1955–7 (d. 2019)
- December 16
  - Nicholas Courtney, British actor (d. 2011)
  - Arthur Fitzsimons, Irish football player, manager (d. 2018)
- December 17 – William Safire, American author, columnist, journalist and presidential speechwriter (d. 2009)
- December 19 – David Douglas, 12th Marquess of Queensberry, Scottish potter and aristocrat (d. 2026)
- December 20
  - Salim Al-Huss, 3-time prime minister of Lebanon (d. 2024)
  - Lee Hyun-jae, South Korean politician, Prime Minister
  - Milan Panić, Serbian politician, Prime Minister of Serbia and Montenegro (d. 2026)
- December 22 – Wazir Mohammad Pakistani cricketer (d. 2025)
- December 23
  - Chet Baker, American jazz musician (d. 1988)
  - Monique Watteau, Belgian writer and artist
- December 24 – David H. DePatie, American film and television producer (d. 2021)
- December 26
  - Kathleen Crowley, American actress (d. 2017)
  - Taarak Mehta, Indian playwright and humorist (d. 2017)
  - Régine, Belgian-French discothèque pioneer and singer (d. 2022)
  - Leon Knabit, Polish Benedictine monk
- December 27 – Tommy Rall, American actor and dancer (d. 2020)
- December 28 – Efraín Goldenberg, Peruvian politician, finance minister and foreign relations minister (d. 2025)
- December 29
  - Susie Garrett, American actress (d. 2002)
  - Matt "Guitar" Murphy, American blues musician (d. 2018)
- December 31 – Doug Anthony, 2nd Deputy Prime Minister of Australia (d. 2020)

=== Date unknown ===
- Bernard Zoniaba, Congolese politician and writer (d. 2001)

== Deaths ==
=== January ===
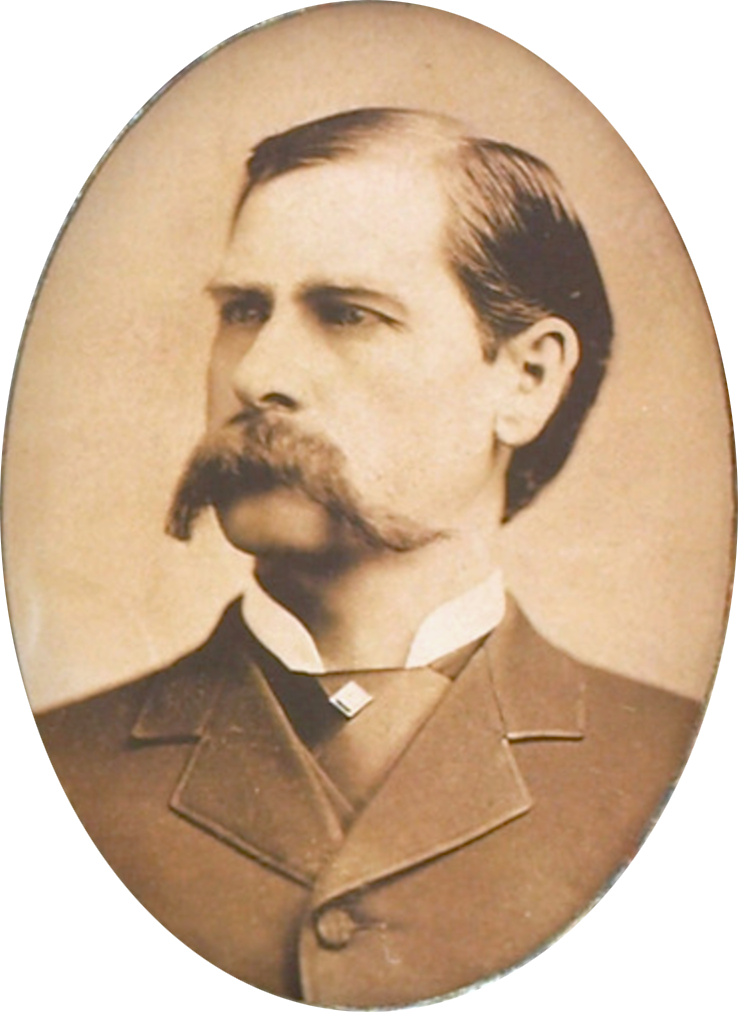
Wyatt Earp

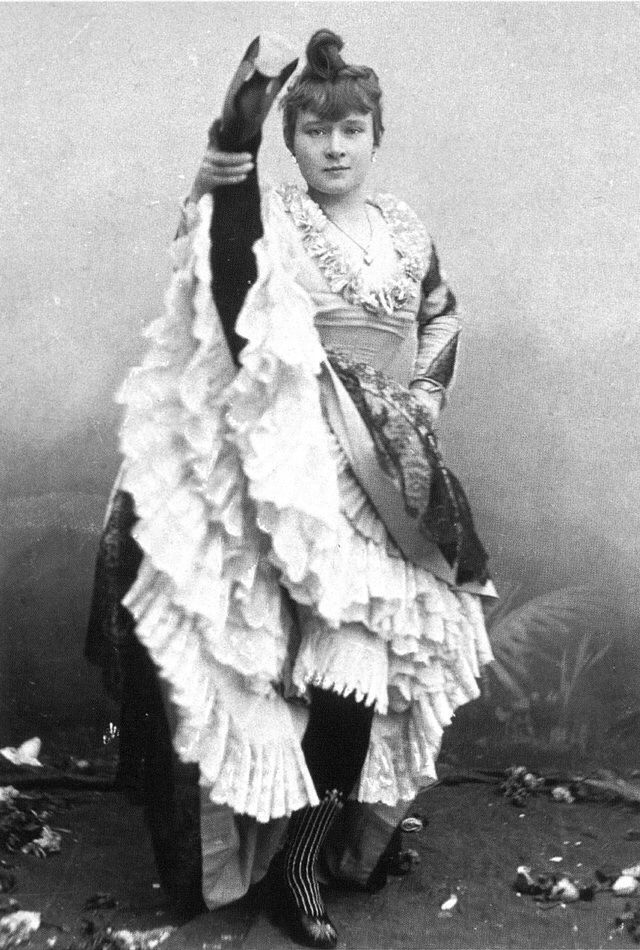
La Goulue

- January 5
  - Marc McDermott, Australian-born American actor (b. 1881)
  - Grand Duke Nicholas Nikolaevich of Russia (b. 1856)
- January 10 – Katherine Delmar Burke, American educator (b. 1867)
- January 13 – Wyatt Earp, American gunfighter and sheriff (b. 1848)
- January 15 – Sir William Dawkins, British geologist and archaeologist (b. 1837)
- January 24 – Wilfred Baddeley, English tennis player (b. 1872)
- January 29 – Paul Gerson Unna, German dermatologist (b. 1850)
- January 30
  - Franklin J. Drake, American admiral (b. 1846)
  - La Goulue, French dancer (b. 1866)

=== February ===
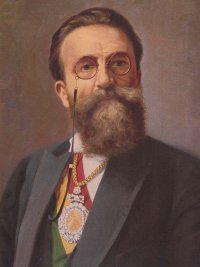
Jose Gutierrez Guerra

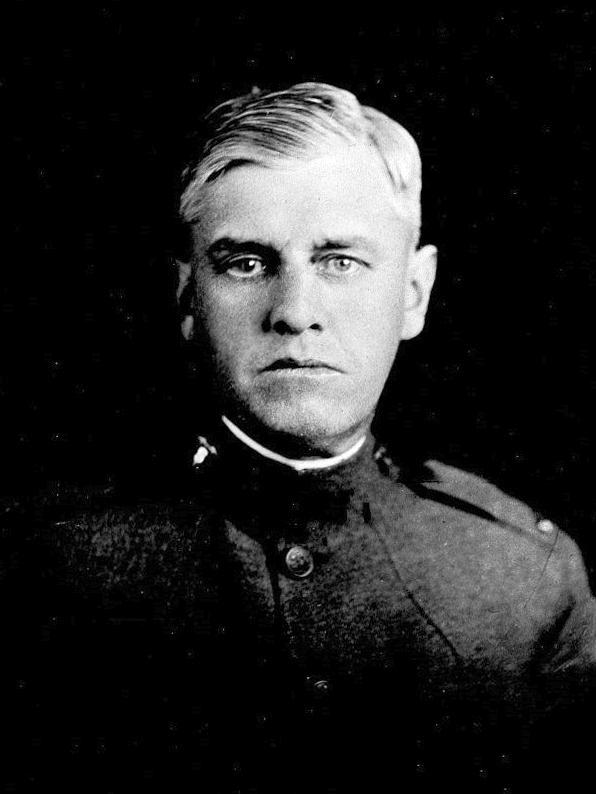
Thomas Burke

- February 3 – José Gutiérrez Guerra, Bolivian economist and statesman, 28th President of Bolivia (b. 1869)
- February 6 – Maria Christina of Austria, Queen Regent of Spain (b. 1858)
- February 7 – Édouard Hugon, French philosopher, theologian (b. 1867)
- February 9 – José de León Toral, Mecican assassin of president Álvaro Obregón (b. 1900)
- February 11 – Johann II, Prince of Liechtenstein (b. 1840)
- February 12 – Lillie Langtry, British singer, actress (b. 1853)
- February 14 – Thomas Burke, American Olympic athlete (b. 1875)
- February 18 – William Russell, American actor (b. 1884)
- February 24 – Frank Keenan, American actor (b. 1858)
- February 27 – Briton Hadden, American co-founder of Time Magazine (b. 1898)

=== March ===
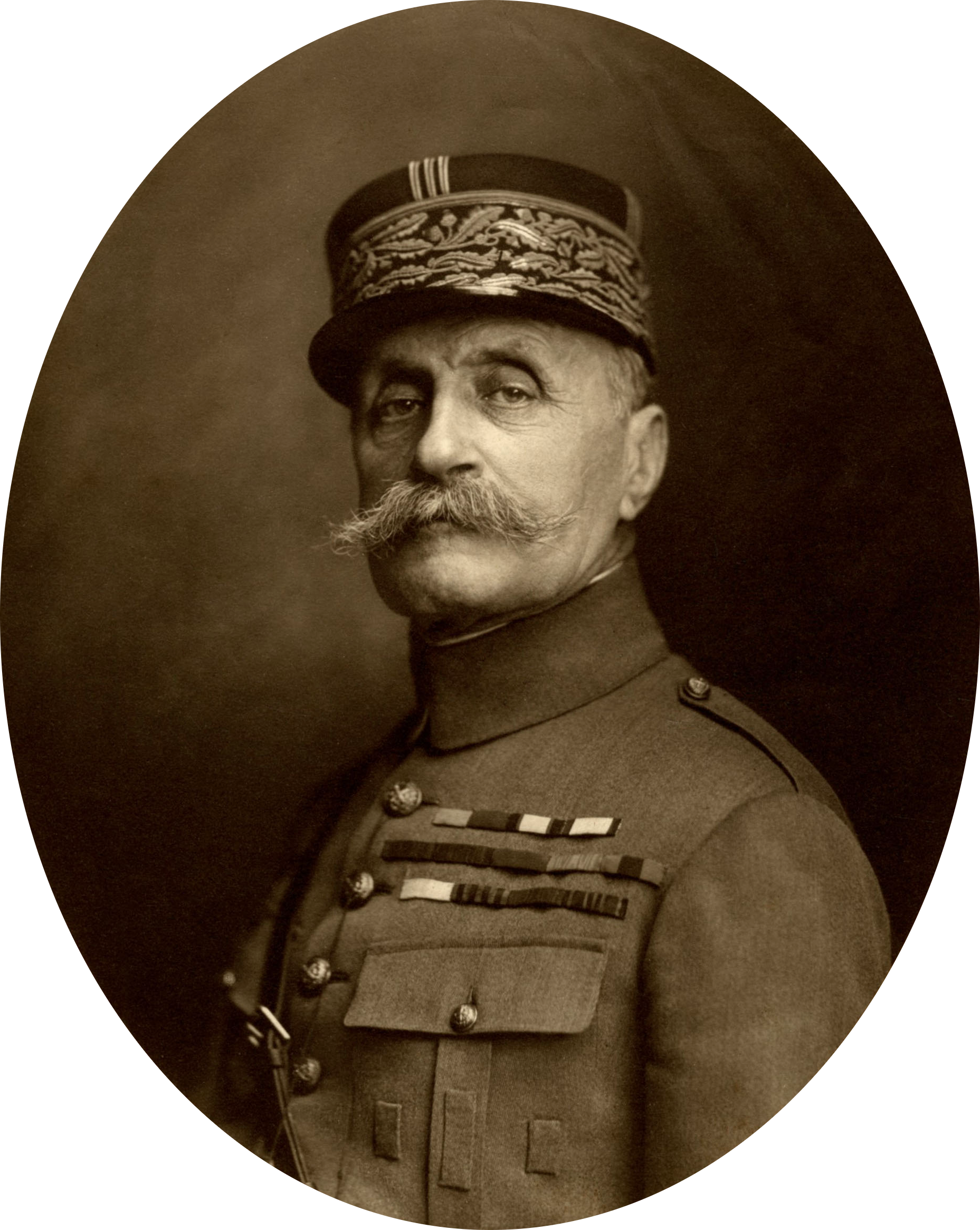
Ferdinand Foch

- March 2 – Sir Edward Seymour, British admiral (b. 1840)
- March 5 – David Dunbar Buick, Scottish-American inventor (b. 1854)
- March 12 – Asa Griggs Candler, American businessman, politician (b. 1851)
- March 15 – Pinetop Smith, African-American blues pianist (b. 1904)
- March 18 – William P. Cronan, American Naval Governor of Guam (b. 1879)
- March 20 – Ferdinand Foch, French commander of Allied forces in World War I (b. 1851)
- March 22 – Inoue Yoshika, Japanese admiral (b. 1845)
- March 23 – Maurice Sarrail, French general (b. 1856)
- March 25 – Robert Ridgway, American ornithologist (b. 1850)
- March 29 – Sir Hugh John Macdonald, 8th premier of Manitoba (b. 1850)

=== April ===
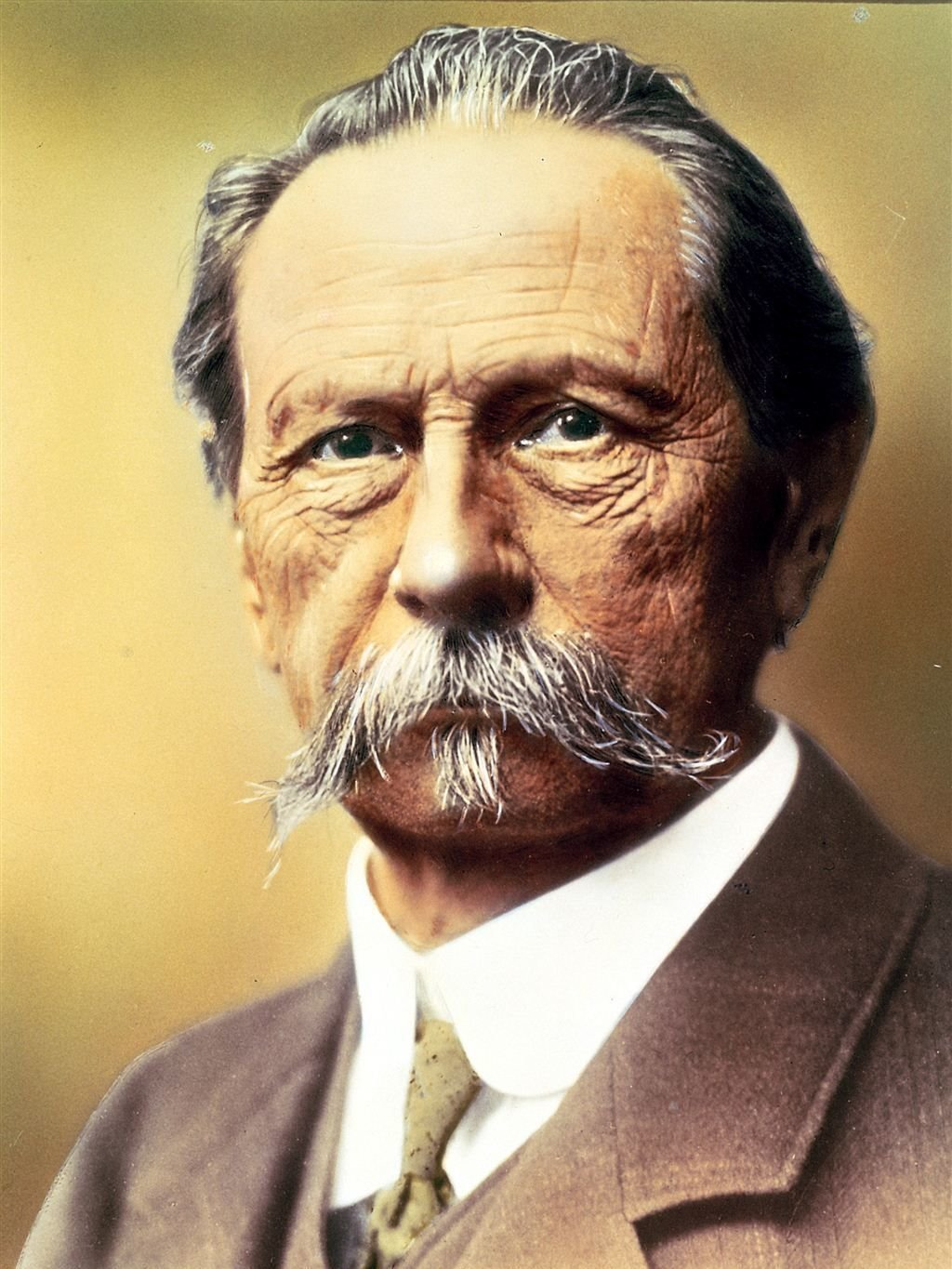
Karl Benz

- April 4
  - Karl Benz, German automotive pioneer (b. 1844)
  - William Michael Crose, United States Navy Commander, 7th Naval Governor of American Samoa (b. 1867)
- April 12 – Enrico Ferri, Italian criminologist (b. 1856)
- April 22 – Henry Lerolle, French painter (b. 1848)
- April 24 – Caroline Rémy de Guebhard, French feminist (b. 1855)

=== May ===
- May 2
  - Segundo de Chomón, Spanish film director (b. 1871)
  - Charalambos Tseroulis, Greek general (b. 1879)
- May 12 – Charles Swickard, German-American film director (b. 1861)
- May 13 – Arthur Scherbius, German electrical engineer, mathematician, cryptanalyst and inventor (b. 1878)
- May 21 – Archibald Primrose, 5th Earl of Rosebery, former Prime Minister of the United Kingdom (b. 1847)
- May 23 – John G. Jacobson, American businessman and politician (b. 1869)
- May 25 – Ernest Monis, 56th Prime Minister of France (b. 1846)

=== June ===
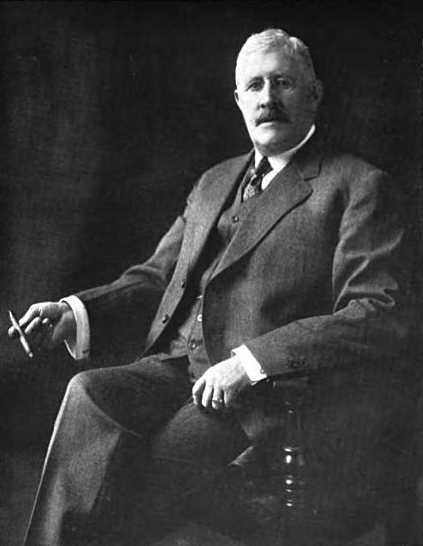
William D. Boyce

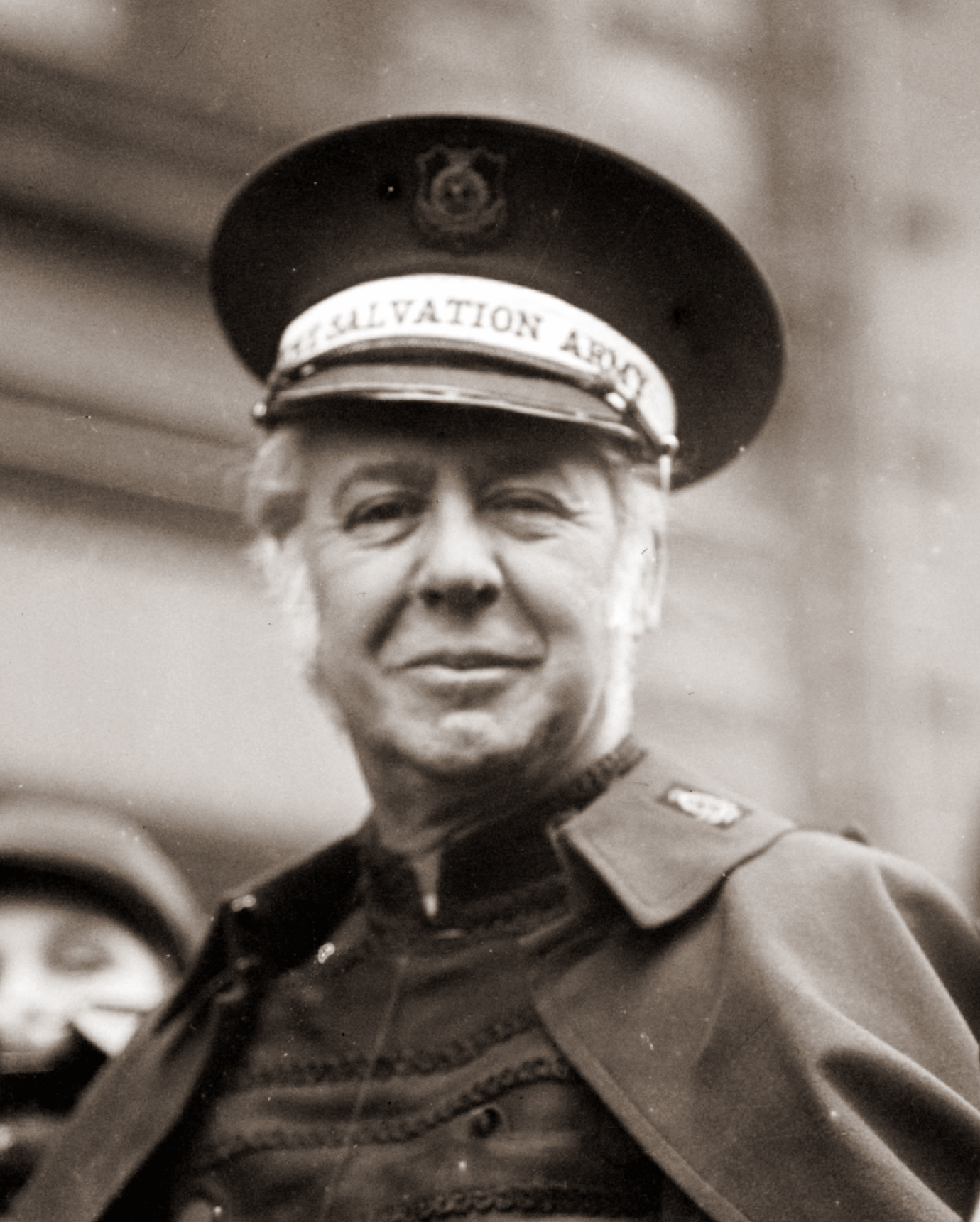
Bramwell Booth

- June 5
  - Adolph Coors, German-American brewer (b. 1847)
  - Sir Cecil Burney, British admiral of the fleet (b. 1858)
- June 9 – Alice Gossage, American journalist (b. 1861)
- June 8 – Bliss Carman, Canadian poet (b. 1861)
- June 11 – William D. Boyce, American entrepreneur, founder of the Boy Scouts of America (b. 1858)
- June 16 – Bramwell Booth, General of The Salvation Army (b. 1856)
- June 21 – Leonard Hobhouse, British political theorist, sociologist (b. 1864)
- June 24 – Queenie Newall, British Olympic archer (b. 1854)
- June 26 – Amandus Adamson, Estonian sculptor (b. 1855)
- June 28 – Edward Carpenter, English poet (b. 1844)

=== July ===
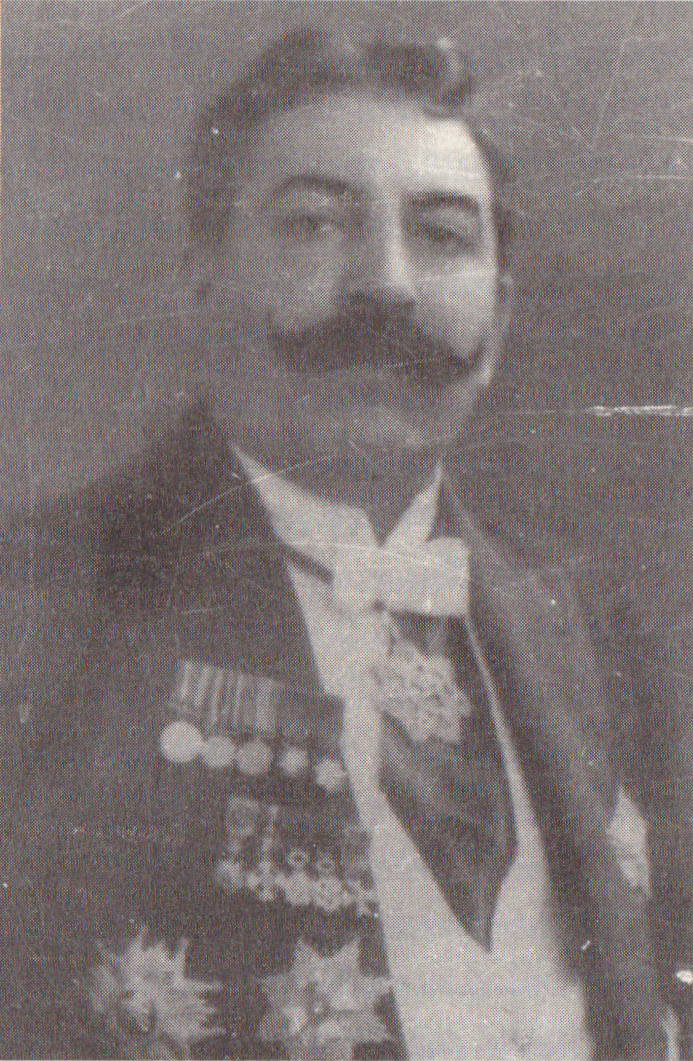
Ali Ahmad Khan

- July 2 – Gladys Brockwell, American actress (b. 1893)
- July 3 – Dustin Farnum, American actor (b. 1874)
- July 11 – Ali Ahmad Khan, Afghan politician, emir (b. 1883)
- July 12 – Robert Henri, American painter (b. 1865)
- July 15 – Hugo von Hofmannsthal, Austrian writer (b. 1874)

=== August ===
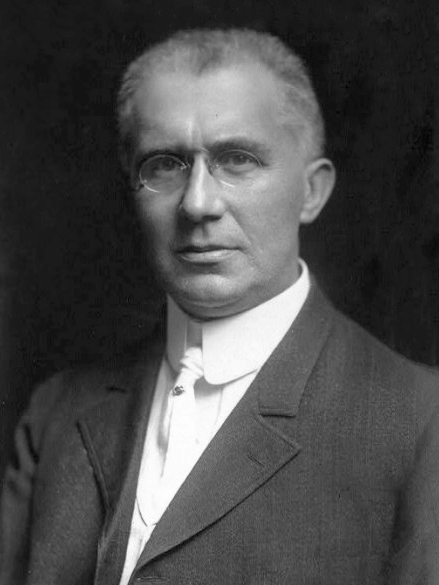
Emile Berliner

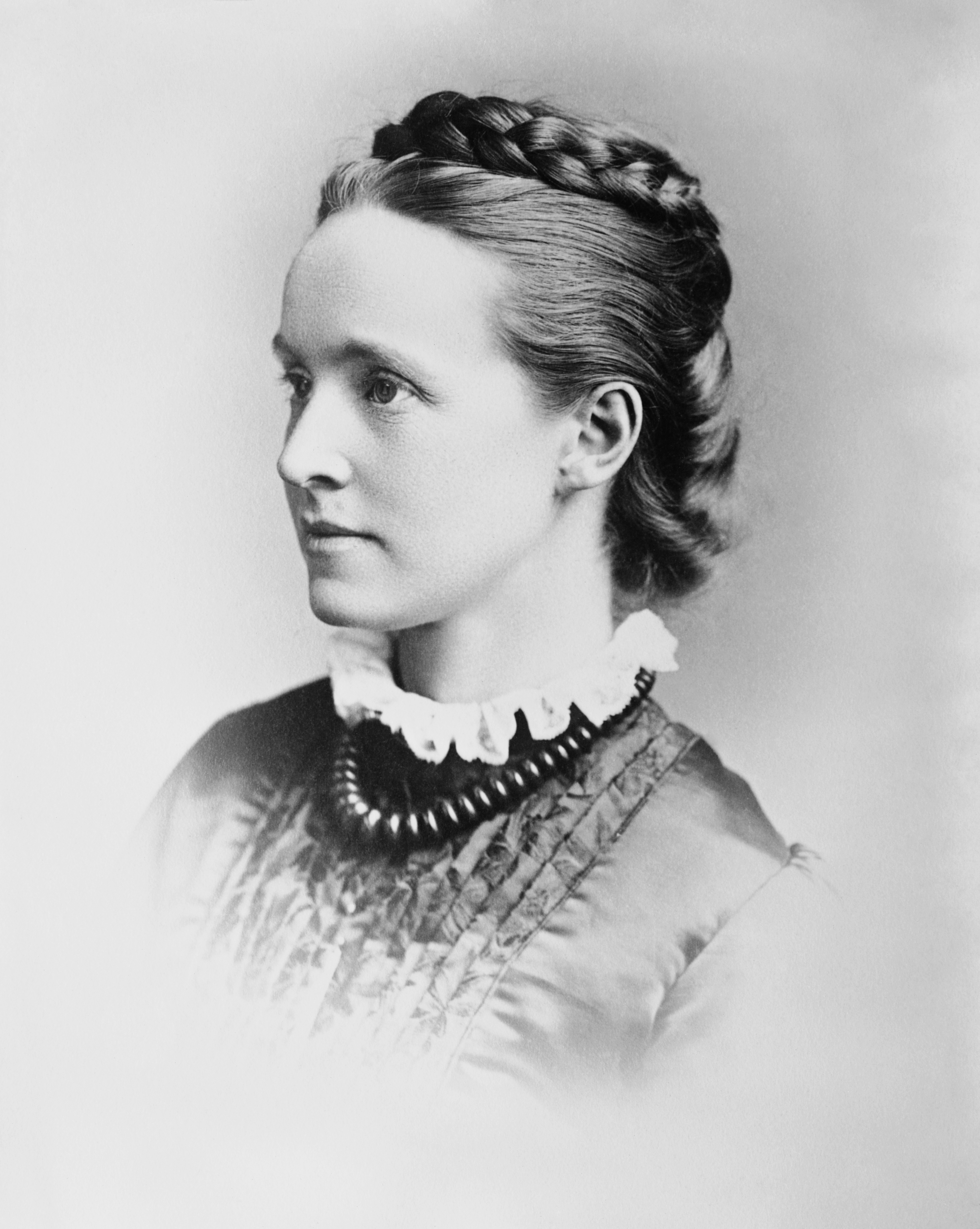
Millicent Fawcett

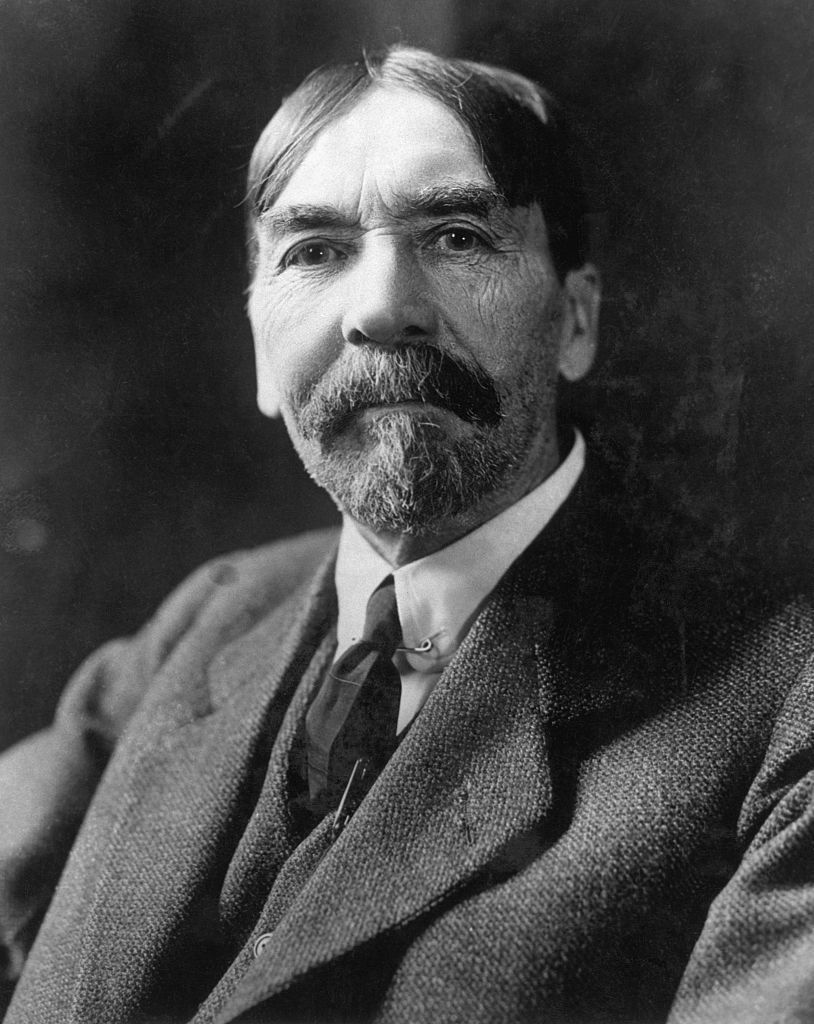
Thorstein Veblen

- August – Mary MacLane, Canadian feminist writer (b. 1881)
- August 3
  - Emile Berliner, German-born inventor (b. 1851)
  - Thorstein Veblen, Norwegian-American economist (b. 1857)
- August 4 – Carl Auer von Welsbach, Austrian chemist and inventor (b. 1858)
- August 5 – Dame Millicent Fawcett, British suffragist, feminist (b. 1847)
- August 9 – Pierre Fatou, French mathematician (b. 1878)
- August 10 – Aletta Jacobs, Dutch physician and women's suffrage activist (b. 1854)
- August 13 – Sir Ray Lankester, British zoologist (b. 1847)
- August 14 – Henry Horne, 1st Baron Horne, British general (b. 1861)
- August 19 – Sergei Diaghilev, Russian ballet impresario (b. 1872)
- August 20 – Albert Parker Niblack, American admiral (b. 1859)
- August 22 – Otto Liman von Sanders, German general (b. 1855)
- August 26 – Sir Ernest Satow, British diplomat, scholar (b. 1843)
- August 27 – Herman Potočnik, Slovenian rocket engineer (b. 1892)

=== September ===
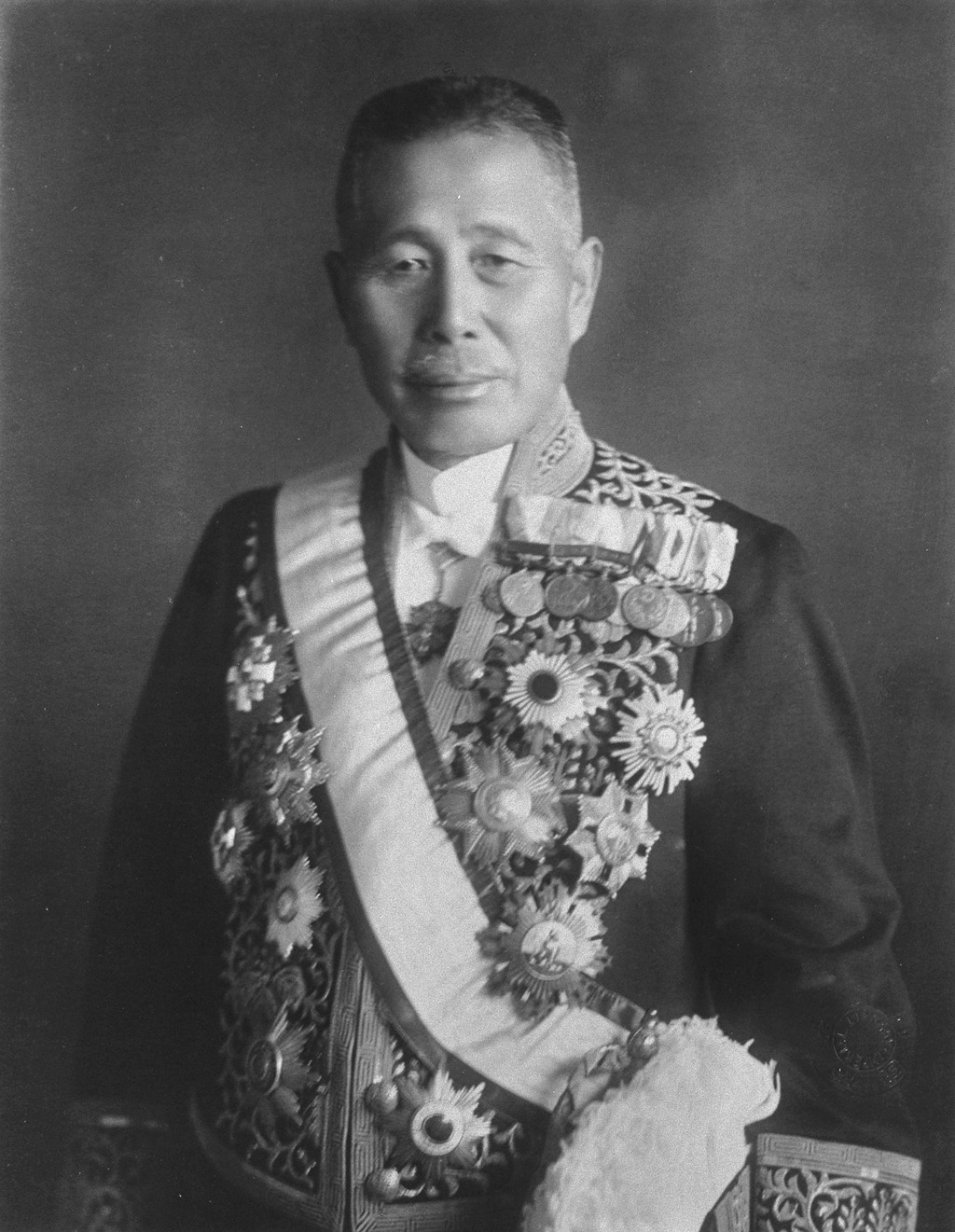
Tanaka Giichi

- September 2 – Paul Leni, German filmmaker (b. 1885)
- September 12 – Rainis, Latvian poet, playwright (b. 1865)
- September 23 – Richard Adolf Zsigmondy, Austrian-born chemist, Nobel Prize laureate (b. 1865)
- September 24 – Mahidol Adulyadej, Thai doctor, father of King Rama IX (b. 1892)
- September 25 – Miller Huggins, American baseball manager, MLB Hall of Famer (b. 1879)
- September 27 – Johnny Hill, British, European, and World flyweight boxing champion (b. 1905)
- September 29 – Tanaka Giichi, 26th Prime Minister of Japan (b. 1864)

=== October ===
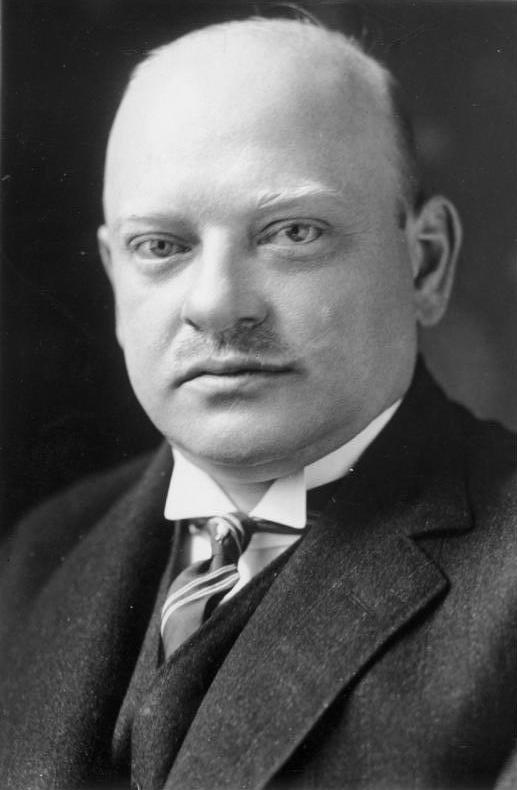
Gustav Stresemann

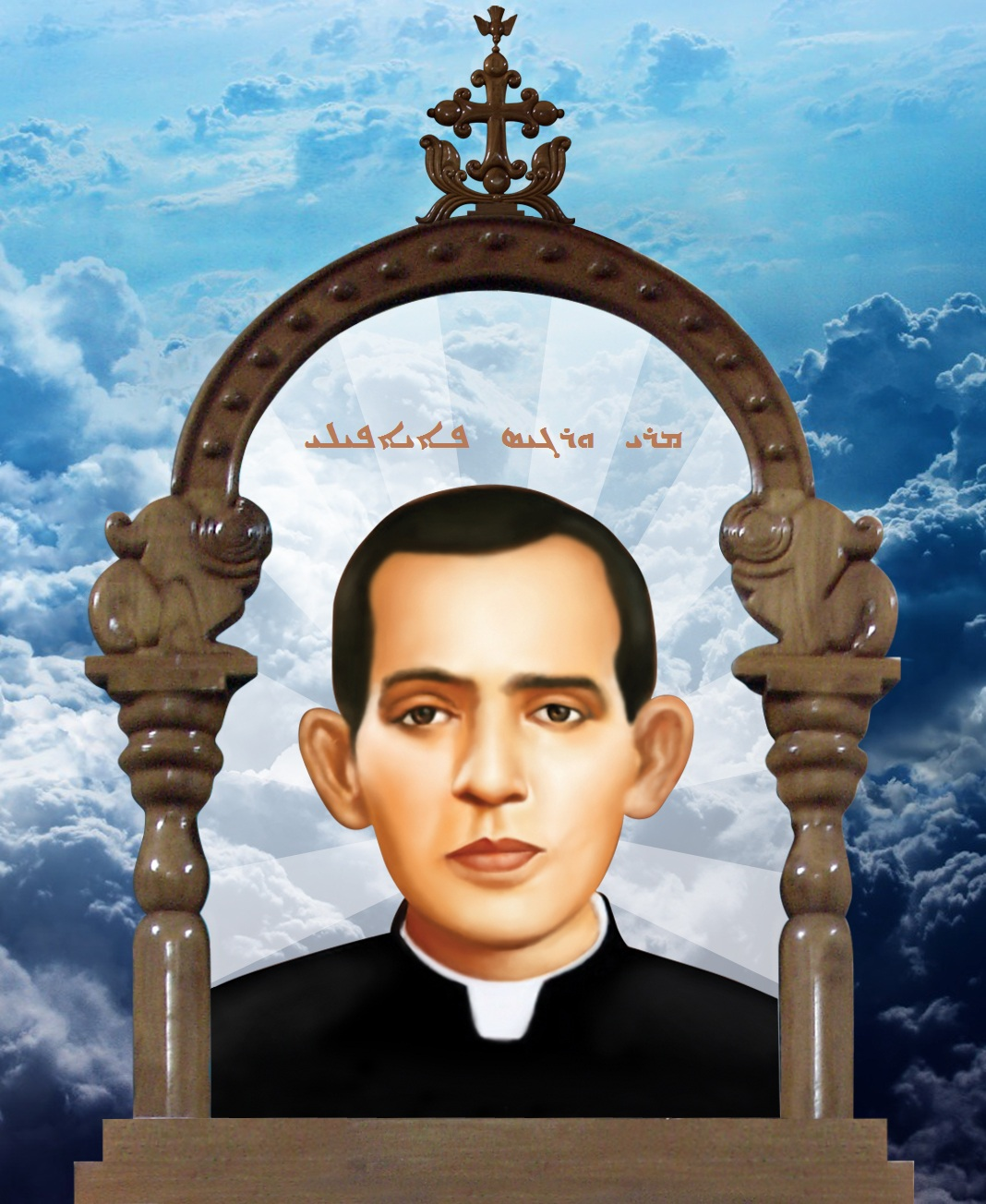
Venerable Varghese Payyappilly Palakkappilly

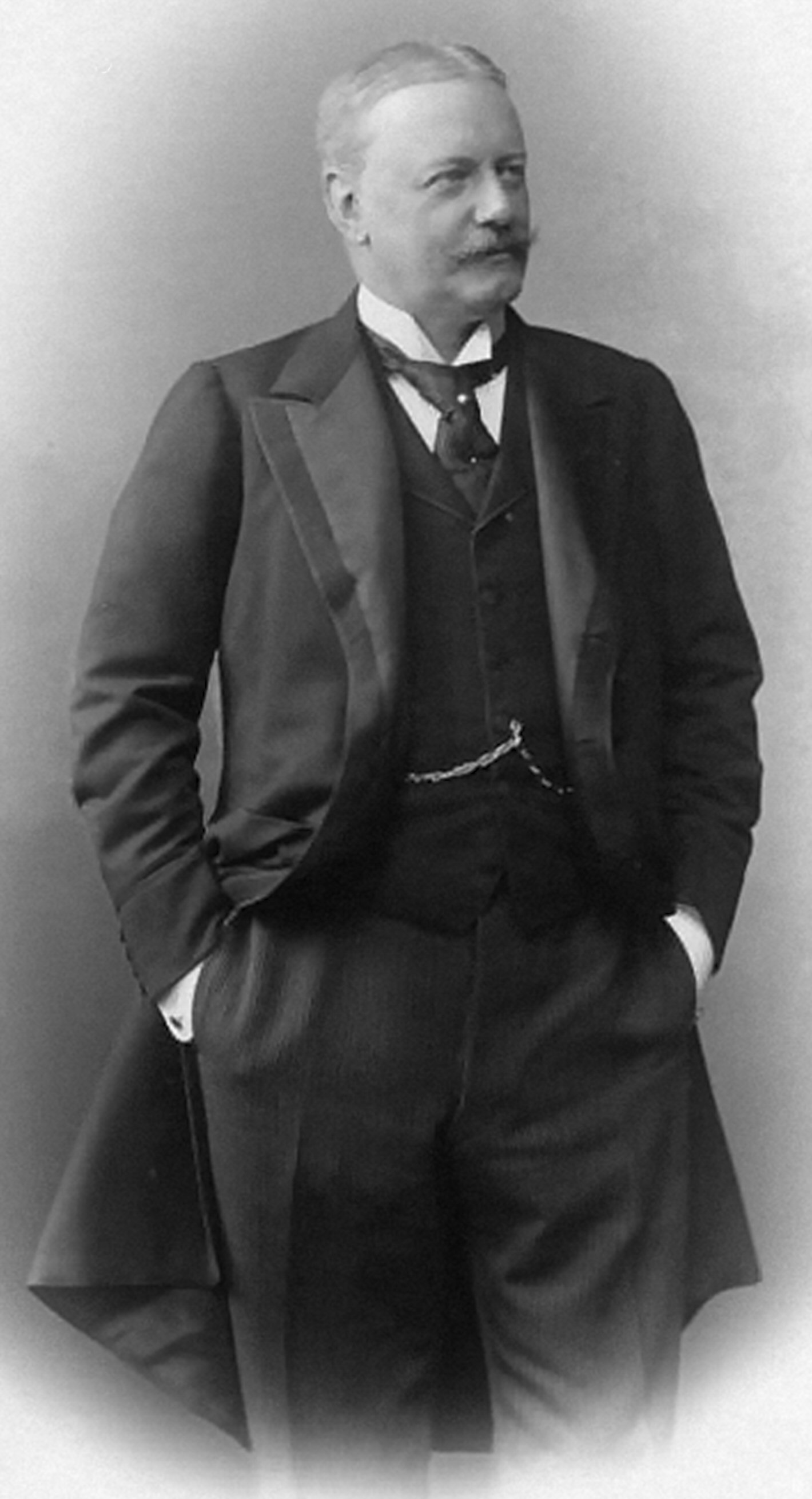
Bernhard von Bülow

- October 1 – Antoine Bourdelle, French sculptor (b. 1861)
- October 3
  - Jeanne Eagels, American actress (b. 1890)
  - Gustav Stresemann, German statesman, 16th Chancellor of Germany, recipient of the Nobel Peace Prize (b. 1878)
- October 5 – Varghese Payyappilly Palakkappilly, Indian Syro-Malabar Catholic priest and venerable (b. 1876)
- October 20 – José Batlle y Ordóñez, 3-time President of Uruguay (b. 1856)
- October 21 – Vasil Radoslavov, 7th Prime Minister of Bulgaria (b. 1854)
- October 26 – Aby Warburg, German historian, cultural theorist (b. 1866)
- October 27
  - Théodore Tuffier, French surgeon (b. 1857)
  - Georg von der Marwitz, German general (b. 1856)
- October 28 – Bernhard von Bülow, German count and statesman, 8th Chancellor of Germany (b. 1849)
- October 29 – Emily Robin, English Madame (b. 1874)
- October 31 – António José de Almeida, Portuguese political figure, 64th Prime Minister of Portugal and 6th President of Portugal (b. 1866)

=== November ===
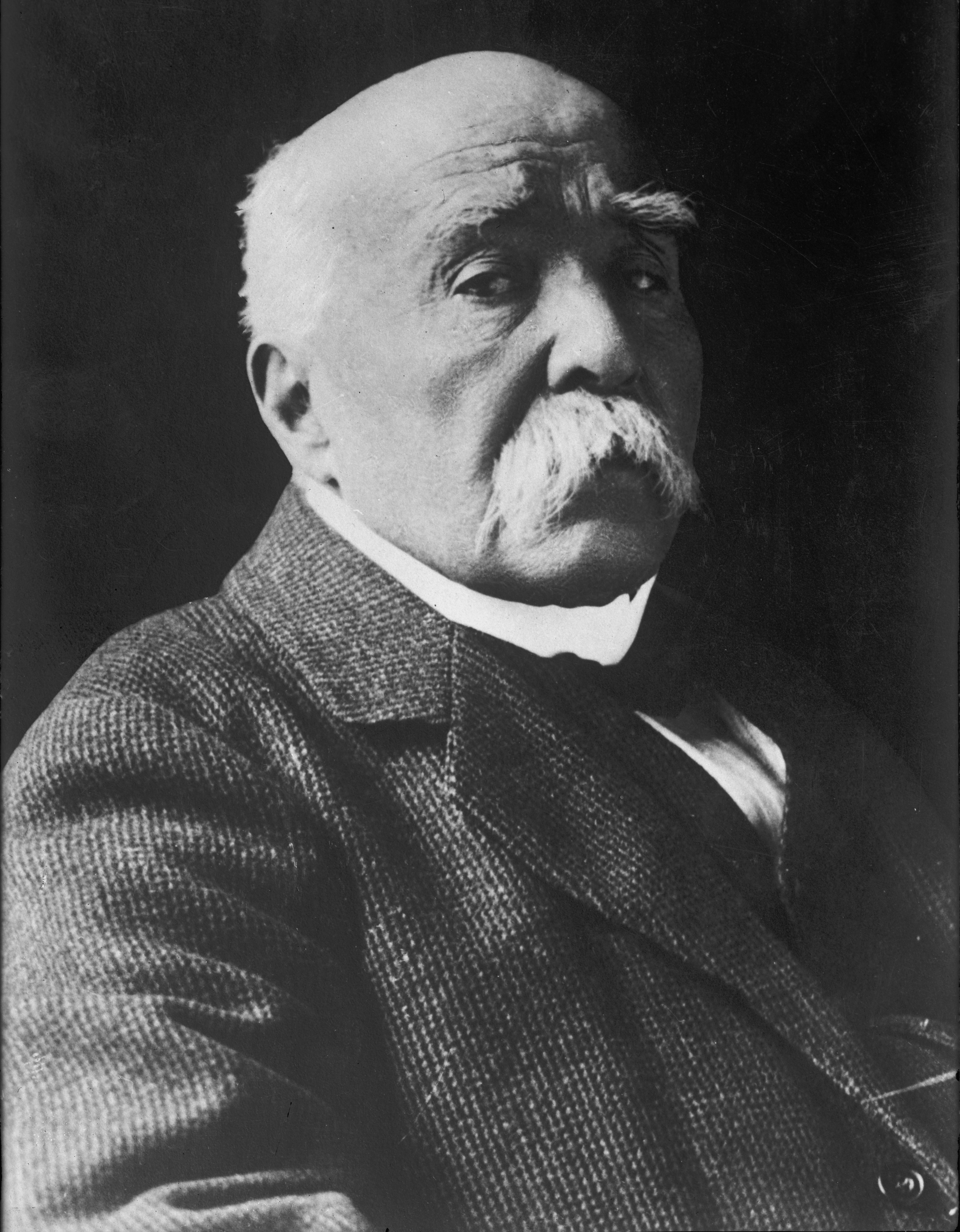
Georges Clemenceau

- November 1 – Habibullāh Kalakāni, deposed Emir of Afghanistan (b. 1891)
- November 6 – Prince Maximilian of Baden, Chancellor of Germany (b. 1867)
- November 14 – Joe McGinnity, American baseball player, MLB Hall of Famer (b. 1871)
- November 15 – Léon Delacroix, former Prime Minister of Belgium (b. 1867)
- November 17 – Herman Hollerith, American businessman, inventor (b. 1860)
- November 24
  - Georges Clemenceau, Prime Minister of France, leader during World War I (b. 1841)
  - Raymond Hitchcock, American actor (b. 1865)
- November 26 – Chandra Shumsher Jang Bahadur Rana, 13th Prime Minister of Nepal (b. 1863)

=== December ===
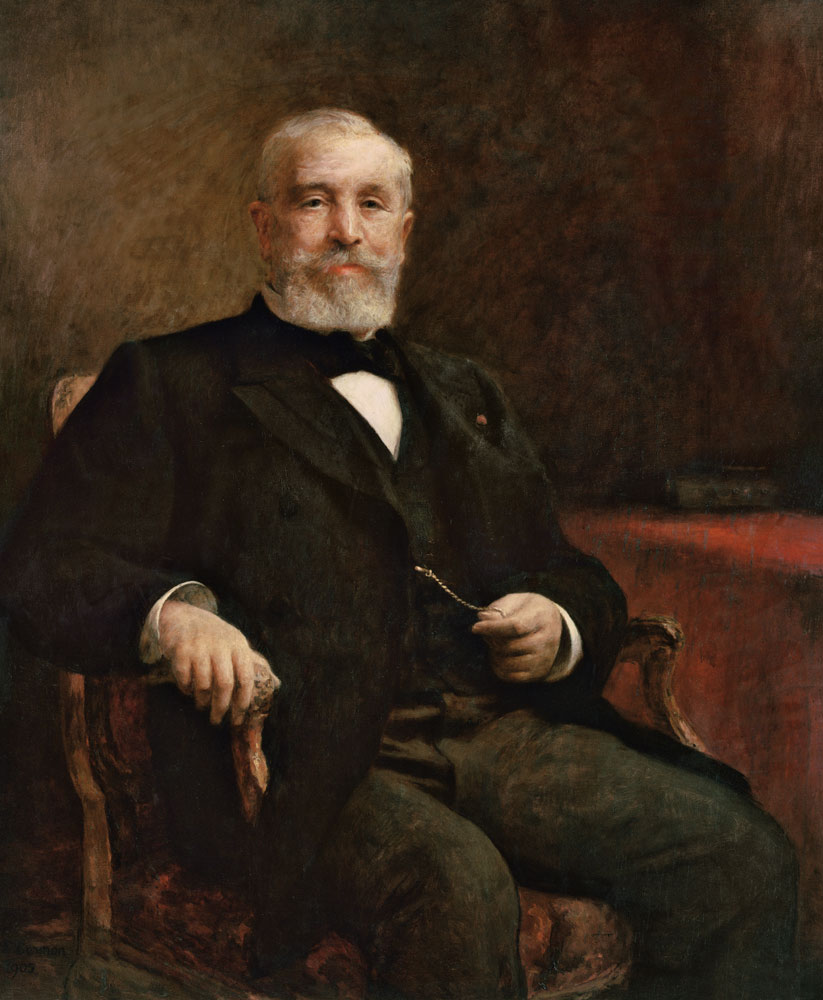
Émile Loubet

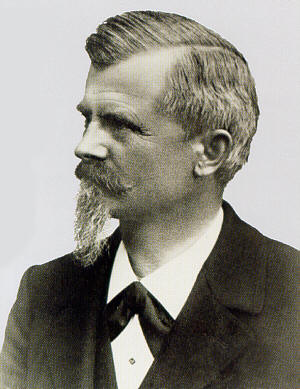
Wilhelm Maybach

- December 10
  - Frederick Abberline, Chief Inspector of the London Metropolitan Police, investigator in the Jack the Ripper murders (b. 1843)
  - Harry Crosby, American publisher, poet (b. 1898)
- December 14 – Henry B. Jackson, British admiral (b. 1855)
- December 17
  - Manuel Gomes da Costa, Portuguese general, politician and 10th President of Portugal (b. 1863)
  - Arthur G. Jones-Williams, British aviator (b. 1898)
- December 20 – Émile Loubet, French politician, 8th President of France (b. 1838)
- December 21 – I. L. Patterson, American politician, 18th Governor of Oregon (b. 1859)
- December 29 – Wilhelm Maybach, German automobile designer (b. 1846)

== Nobel Prizes ==

- Physics – Louis de Broglie
- Chemistry – Arthur Harden, Hans Karl August Simon von Euler-Chelpin
- Physiology or Medicine – Christiaan Eijkman, Sir Frederick Gowland Hopkins
- Literature – Thomas Mann
- Peace – Frank Billings Kellogg

== Sources ==
- The 1930s Timeline: 1929 – from American Studies Programs at The University of Virginia
