= Bernard Zoniaba =

Congolese politician and writer (1929 - 2001)

Bernard Zoniaba (1929 – 2001) was a Congolese politician and writer. Zoniaba worked as primary school superintendent, later becoming the Congolese representative to Unesco. In 1965 Zoniaba was appointed Minister of Information and Civic and Popular Education.

== Bibliography ==
- Les Rescapés de Mbirou, published in Romania, 1966
- Hier et maintant, published by Nouvelles du Sud, Paris, 1993
