= Qataghan Province =

Province of Afghanistan, 1945–1964

Province of Qataghan (c. 1945–1964) ولایت قطغن Welāyat-e Qataghan
- Province of Afghanistan
- c. 1945–30 April 1964
- Demonym: Qataghani
- Government
  - Type: Province
- History
  - Established: c. 1945
  - Disestablished: 30 April 1964
Preceded by
c. 1945: Province of Qataghan and Badakhshan (Large Governorate of Qataghan)
Succeeded by
1964: Province of Baghlan
1964: Province of Kunduz
1964: Province of Takhar
- Today part of: Afghanistan

The Province of Qataghan (Persian: قطغن) was a province of Afghanistan, existing from around 1945 until 1964, when it was divided into the present-day provinces of Baghlan, Kunduz, and Takhar. Its territory corresponded broadly to the lowland and foothill districts of northeastern Afghanistan drained by the Kunduz River and its tributaries south of the Amu Darya.

Until 1890, Qataghan had formed part of the province of Turkestan, before being merged with neighbouring Badakhshan into a unified district under the Northern Bureau in Kabul. After a period of resubordination to Turkestan between 1905 and 1921, the region was reconstituted as the province of Qataghan and Badakhshan under King Amanullah Khan, which persisted until its dissolution by 1945, when Qataghan became a separate province for the first time.

== Etymology ==
The name Qataghan derives from the Katagans, an Uzbek tribal confederation that formed the dominant political and military force in the region during the early modern period. The Khanate of Kunduz, which ruled the area in the early nineteenth century, was led by Katagan Uzbeks, whose tribal confederation formed the core of the ruling elite, military leadership, and administrative structure of the khanate.

Historian William Maley argued that the removal of the term Qataghan from the administrative map upon the province's dissolution in 1964 was not merely a technical reorganisation, but part of a deliberate state policy of removing ethnic identities from administrative place names, drawing a comparison with the simultaneous division and renaming of Hazarajat, the homeland of the Hazaras.

== History ==
The broader region of Qataghan had long been a distinct geographic and political unit within northern Afghanistan, centred on the fertile plains of the Kunduz River valley. The Khanate of Kunduz, established in the early nineteenth century under Mir Muhammad Murad Beg, extended its control across the northeastern lowlands and into parts of Badakhshan, incorporating settlements along the Kunduz valley into a network secured by fortified outposts and tributary systems. The khanate reached the peak of its power under Murad Beg and was eventually conquered by Afghanistan in 1859, before being formally abolished by Abdur Rahman Khan in 1888. Following its incorporation into the Afghan state, the Qataghan region was administered as part of Afghan Turkestan, one of the country's large provincial units. In 1890, Qataghan was separated from Afghan Turkestan and merged with neighbouring Badakhshan into a unified district under the administration of the Northern Bureau in Kabul. By 1905, this arrangement had been reversed and the district resubordinated to Turkestan, though it continued to function as a distinct administrative unit under its own governor.

The separation from Turkestan became permanent only under King Amanullah Khan. The regulation on the territorial divisions of afghanistan (Dari: نظامنامه تقسیمات ملکیه افغانستان, romanized: niẓāmnāmah-i taqsīmāt-i mulkīyah-i Afghānistān), issued in 1300 Solar Hijri (1921/22 Gregorian), reconstituted Qataghan and Badakhshan as the province of Qataghan and Badakhshan, a single distinct province in which Qataghan formed one of two large governorates, further subdivided into governorates, sub-districts, and villages. Prior to 1946, this unified province was dissolved and Qataghan became a separate province for the first time.

The Afghan Constitution of 1964 introduced a principle of balanced regional development and called for a rationalisation of provincial boundaries. As part of the broader reorganisation of 1964, in which Afghanistan expanded from fewer than 20 to 29 provinces, Qataghan's territory was allocated to the three new provinces of Baghlan, Kunduz, and Takhar. The new boundaries roughly followed the main river valleys and district lines, with Baghlan centred on the upper Kunduz basin, Kunduz on the northern plains toward the Amu Darya, and Takhar on the eastern districts around Taloqan.

== Administration ==
As an independent province, Qataghan with its capital Baghlan corresponded broadly to the territory of the former Khanate of Kunduz, which had dominated the northeastern lowlands of Afghanistan in the early nineteenth century. The districts of the former khanate lying west of the Kunduz River, including Tashkurgan and Aybak, had by the time of the 1921 reorganisation been incorporated into Turkestan rather than Qataghan.

Subdivisions of Qataghan
Governorate	Sub-Districts
–	–
–	Nahrin and Eshkamesh (1st)
–	Qunduz (1st)
–	Bar Kar and Tamiz (?) (2nd)
Khost Ferenk (2nd)	–
Taloqan (2nd)	–
Andarab (1st)	–
Andarab (1st)	Khenjan (2nd)
Ghori (1st)	–
Ghori (1st)	Talah and Barfak (2nd)
Ghori (1st)	Kil Ki (?) (2nd)
Ghori (1st)	Baghlan (2nd)
Ghori (1st)	Doshi (2nd)

== Demographics ==
The province was ethnically diverse, with the Uzbek population forming a historically dominant group in the region, alongside significant Tajik communities concentrated in sedentary agricultural roles along the river valleys. From the late nineteenth century onward, the ethnic composition of the lowlands shifted substantially as a result of state-directed Pashtun settlement. Under the Musahiban dynasty, Pashtun migration into the Kunduz region was actively encouraged as part of a broader policy of ethnic resettlement, with wetlands drained and new agricultural land opened to incoming settlers.

== Economy ==
The Qataghan region was among the most agriculturally productive parts of Afghanistan. The Kunduz River valley, which dominates the landscape, provided irrigation to an extensive system of cultivated fields. The river and its tributaries and derivative canals were the foundation of the provincial economy. Economic development accelerated significantly in the interwar period under governors such as Sher Khan Nashir, who drained marshlands for irrigation, promoted cotton cultivation, and established the Spinzar Cotton Company, transforming the Kunduz basin into Afghanistan's leading cotton-producing area and one of the wealthiest regions in the country by mid-century. Beyond cotton, the region produced wheat, rice, and sesame, and supported substantial livestock herding.

== Culture ==
The Qataghan region gave rise to a distinct musical style known as Qataghani, characterised by its own melodic conventions and performance traditions. Qataghani music remains a recognised genre within Afghan folk music and continues to be associated with the communities of the former province's territory.

== See also ==
- Badakhshan District
- Qataghan and Badakhshan Province
- Baghlan Province
- Kunduz Province
- Takhar Province
- Administrative divisions of Afghanistan
