= Afghan Conquest of Kunduz =

Part of Dost Mohammad's campaigns (1859)

- Part of Campaigns of Dost Mohammad Khan
Date	May – June 1859
Location	Kunduz
Result	Afghan victory
Territorial changes	Subjugation of the Kunduz Khanate and Badakhshan into the Emirate of Afghanistan

Belligerents
Emirate of Afghanistan	Kunduz Khanate; Badakhshan; Kulob; Rostaq; Emirate of Bukhara

Commanders and leaders
Dost Mohammad Khan; Mohammad Azam Khan; Mohammad Afzal Khan; Abdur Rahman Khan; Mohammad Sharif Khan; Shams al-Din Khan; Mohammad Zaman Khan	Mir Ataliq (surrendered); Mir Suhrab Beg; Mir Shah; Mir Yusuf Ali (Emirate of Bukhara) Nasrullah Khan

Strength
20,000; 40 guns	40,000 (1859); 50,000 Bukharans (1859); 22,000 (1860)

The Afghan Conquest of Kunduz took place from May to June 1859. The conflict was between the Kunduz Khanate and the Emirate of Afghanistan. The conflict began after Mir Ataliq, the ruler of Kunduz, though nominally under Afghan rule, wished to remain under a degree of high autonomy. Mir Ataliq rejected many of the Afghan demands to re-enter their suzerainty, leading to Afghan forces under Afzal Khan to began mobilizing. The Afghans assembled their forces along the border of Kunduz, with an envoy delivering an ultimatum, which the Mir Ataliq did not respond to. This led to the Afghans invading in May 1859.

The Afghans defeated the armies of Mir Ataliq in battle, forcing his abdication as the Afghans closed in on his capital, with his brother-in-law negotiating a peace settlement that saw the Afghans annex the Kunduz Khanate. Badakhshan was also subjugated under Afghan rule during this conflict.

== Background ==
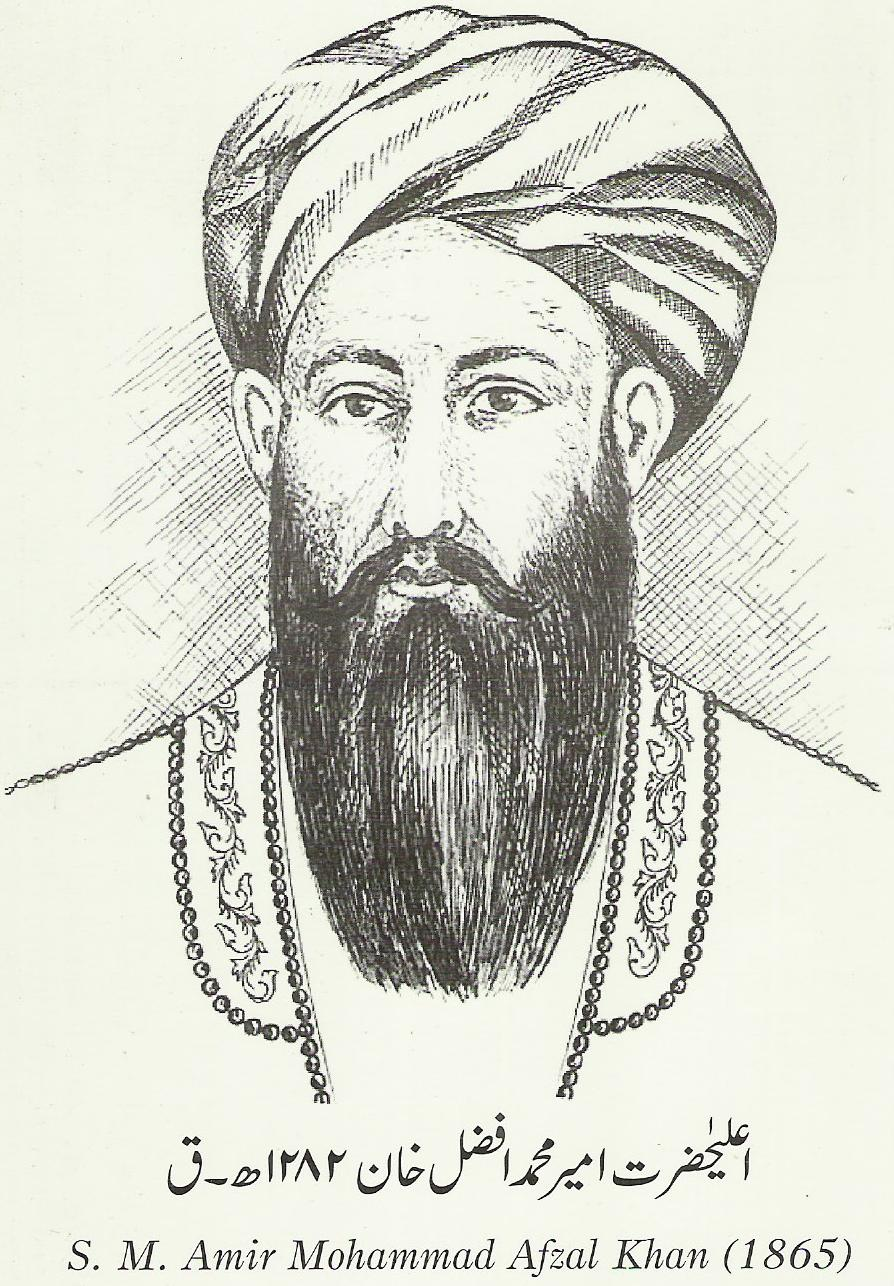
Sketch of Muhammad Afzal Khan

Afzal Khan, the governor of Afghan Turkestan, held conflicting relations with Mir Ataliq, the ruler of the Kunduz Khanate, and had been sending letters to the government centered in Kabul to allow a campaign into Kunduz. In the spring of 1858, Afzal Khan sent an envoy to Mir Ataliq, requesting he read the Khutbah in the name of Dost Mohammad Khan, as well as admitting officers into the country to assess revenues for taxation. Due to the demands effectively stripping the independence of Kunduz, Mir Ataliq rejected the offer and sent one of his brothers as an envoy to Takhtapul, rejecting the demands and also sending a message that was a disguised threat.

The envoy sent, a brother of Mir Ataliq, also supported the idea of Afghan sovereignty, which enraged Mir Ataliq. After providing a false pretense of allowing him to safely return, The Kunduz cavalry pursued him and caught him in the region of Dasht-i-Abdan, where he was executed. Another brother of Mir Ataliq was also imprisoned by the Mir Ataliq. Following this, Mir Ataliq sent letters to the governors of Aqcha, Maimana, Andkhui, and Sheberghan, asking that they revolt against the Afghan government. However, this was intercepted by Afzal Khan, and immediately wrote to Dost Mohammad Khan, requesting aid to be sent to tame Kunduz. Reinforcements were sent under Azam Khan, Sharif Khan, and Shams al-Din Khan.

On 11 August, another brother, or son of the Mir Ataliq was sent as an envoy to Kabul. The envoy persisted in showing Mir Ataliq's loyalty to the Afghan government, but also said that if they were to be attacked, they would see assistance from across the Amu Darya, such as with Bukhara. Dost Mohammad utilized his sharp diplomacy to convince the envoy that the Afghan government had no plans to attack Kunduz, giving the campaign more time to prepare.

The Afghans and Mir Ataliq continued to build up for the inevitable military conflict, spending the winter in key preparation, while Bukhara funded Hukumat Khan, the ruler of Maimana, attempting to provoke a revolt in Afghan Turkestan. In early February 1859, Afghan mobilization and movements near the border made Mir Ataliq go in person to Bukhara, requesting their complete aid. Bukhara however, believing that diplomatic negotiation with the Afghans could still be pursued, refused joining the war. Mir Ataliq's travel to Bukhara now made it appear that he was declaring rebellion against the Afghan government, and he returned disappointed to Kunduz.

Afzal Khan, now aware of what happened, demanded that Mir Ataliq cede the territories of Dahan-I-Ghuri, Baghlan, and Ishkamish. This was the entirety of the southern realm of Kunduz, and the districts were the most fertile and populous of the state, which led to Mir Ataliq declining the offer.

Not long after his return Mir Ataliq's return to Kunduz, Hakim Khan, the deposed ruler of Sheberghan, amended ties with the Afghans and returned to Sheberghan, where he was reinstated as governor under Afghan paramountcy. Following this, Ghazanfar Khan, the ruler of Andkhui, also submitted to Afghan rule on 6 May 1859. Afzal Khan further strengthened his army with the submission of these states. As a result, Mir Ataliq sent an envoy to Afzal Khan, requesting a grace period to allow Mir Ataliq to consider the terms, which was granted, with a period of one month to consider the demands.

Mir Ataliq failed to reply as the grace period expired, which resulted in the Afghan army, led by Azam Khan, and supported by Abdur Rahman Khan, marching across the border with over 20,000 men, and 40 guns.

== Conquest ==
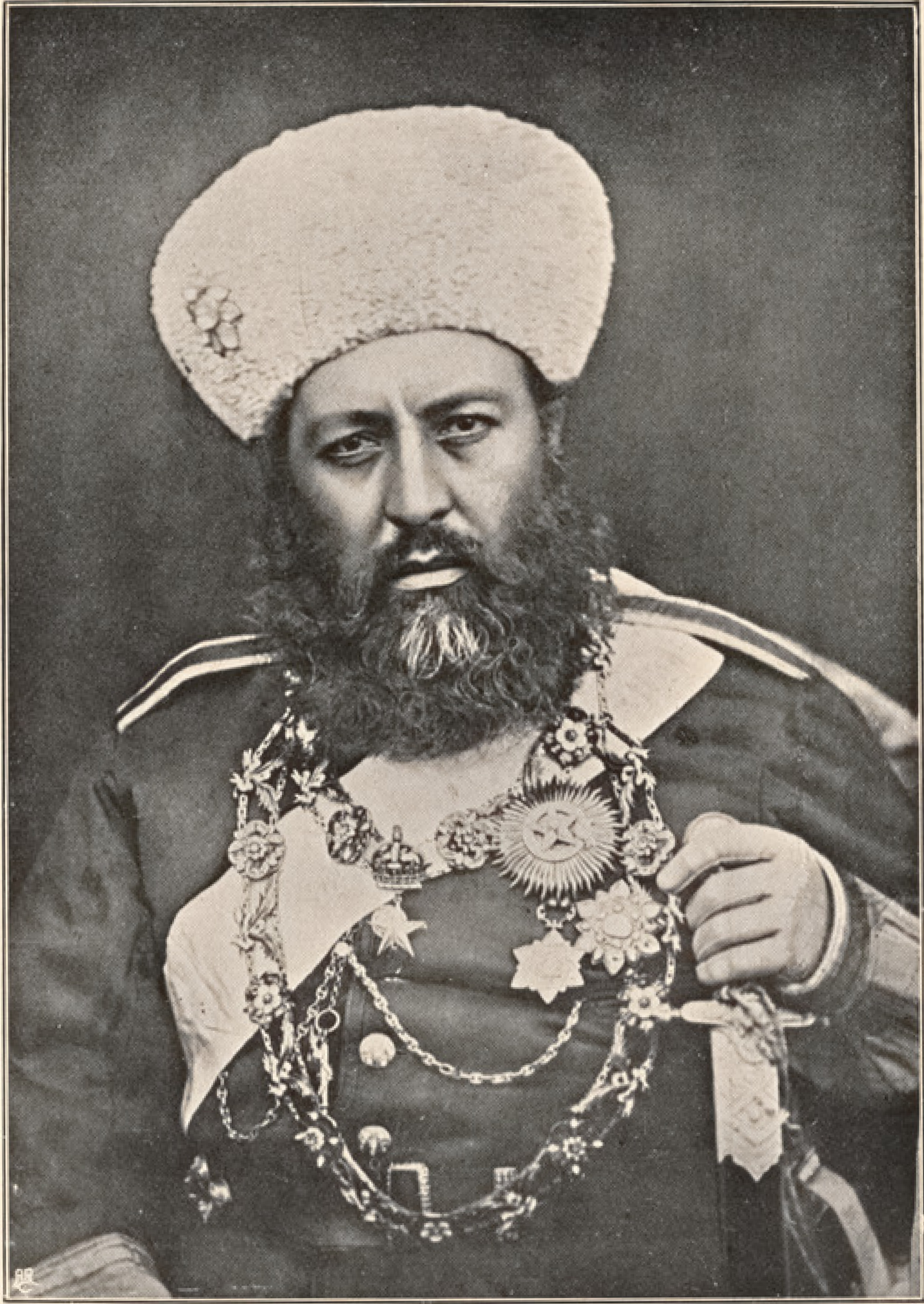
Abdur Rahman Khan, future ruler of Afghanistan

Instead of optimally marching on capital of the Kunduz Khanate, Afzal Khan rallied the forces at Tashqurghan, and advanced into southern Kunduz. With Azam Khan advancing, the Tajiks militias in the region, mistreated under the rule of Kunduz, did not oppose the Afghan advances, which led to the siege of Dahan-I-Ghuri. As news of the Afghan army's advance came to Mir Ataliq, he requested aid from Bukhara once again, proving successful on this occasion, with Bukhara now claiming Kunduz, and mobilizing a force 50,000 strong at Qarshi, planning to attack Aqcha.

With the Afghans besieging Dahan-I-Ghuri, Mir Ataliq advanced from Kunduz with 40,000 men, and marched to relieve the beleaguered garrison. Abdur Rahman Khan, predicting an attack, selected 2,000 men from his best cavalry, alongside four battalions of infantrymen, and established them on a secret route to flank the Mir's forces when they engaged the Afghans. The Kunduz forces, preparing to attack the main force of the Afghans, were caught off guard by the secret force sent by Abdur Rahman, as they opened fire and caused confusion in the ranks of his men. Unaware of the true size of the Afghan army, Mir Ataliq retreated, believing the relief of the fort to be a lost cause.

The following morning after the Mir Ataliq's defeat, Abdur Rahman patrolled the area with 2,000 men, and found a mobilizing force of 8,000 cavalry centered at Chashma-yi Shir. Abdur Rahman dispatched another force of 4,000 men, and confronted the Uzbeks, defeating them and either killing, wounding, or capturing 200. A dispatch force of 1,000 cavalry pursued the Uzbeks to the gates of Baghlan. With these defeats in battle, Mir Ataliq returned to Kunduz.

Following these victories, Abdur Rahman demanded the surrender of the garrison of Dahan-I-Ghuri, offering mercy if they surrendered. However no reply was received. The Afghans them began bombarding the fort with cannons, demoralizing and keeping them awake, making them exhausted and unprepared for a final assault. At dawn, the Afghans began assaulting the city, firstly shouting war cries from all sides outside the fort, demoralizing the enemy and making them believe that they were being assaulted from all sides. The Afghan forces, however, established a column and advanced through a breach made, which quickly forced the defenders of the city to shelter in the citadel. However, the garrison failed to destroy the bridge across the moat, which allowed the Afghans to utilize it. Cannons then barraged the citadel, and with it effectively being demolished, Abdur Rahman offered them to surrender once again, which the garrison accepted.

With the fall of Dahan-I-Ghuri, any resistance to the advancing Afghans broke down. The Afghan armies successfully defeated Mir Ataliq, and in the middle of June, occupied Baghlan, and Khanabad. One of the brothers of Mir Ataliq that was imprisoned escaped, and occupied Hazrat Imam, inviting the Afghans to seize it. Azam Khan assembled a force and began advancing, also intercepting the Jahangir, a Mughal-era great gun. Nasrullah Khan, the ruler of Bukhara, was also unable to provide assistance to Mir Ataliq, with his forces diverted to conflict with a rebellion that began in Hisar.

With Azam Khan advancing on his capital, Mir Ataliq saw the conflict a lost cause, and abdicated, giving power to his brother-in-law, while he fled for Rostaq, which was ruled by Mir Yusuf Ali.

Mir Ataliq's brother-in-law, now the ruler, sent an envoy asking for the Afghan terms of surrender, also assembling elders of Qataghan. The envoys attempted to negotiate lenient terms, requesting the withdrawal of Afghan forces for Kunduz re-entering the suzerainty of the Afghans, and retaining the degree of autonomy they had. However the Afghans, convinced they were in too powerful of a position, demanded that a new leader would be elected from the Qataghan clan, with the forts of Nahrin and Khanabad to be held by Afghan garrisons. The treaty was concluded at the end of June 1859, with all terms agreed to. A contingent of 600 Uzbeks in the Afghan army were sent to Kunduz, taking control of the city, with Afzal Khan arriving not long after.

== Aftermath ==
A dispatch force under Mohammad Zaman Khan was sent to Taloqan, securing the city. Not long after, however, a rebellion sparked in Khost and Andarab, which was suppressed following the arrival of reinforcements, with 8,000 men under Sharif Khan. Mir Ataliq attempted to regain his throne, aided by Mir Suhrab Beg, the ruler of Kulob. Mir Ataliq was also aided by the rulers of Badakhshan. This allowed Mir Ataliq to raise a force of 22,000 men, with Mir Ataliq continuing to resist Afghan rule in the region. In 1860, the forces of Mir Ataliq forced the Afghans to withdraw from Taloqan. Abdur Rahman, discontent with the situation, sent a reinforcement force. Mir Ataliq attempted an attack on Chal and Taloqan. However, his forces were defeated at both locations.

With the Mir's defeat, the rulers of Badakhshan believed the Afghans could not be challenged on the battlefield, and as a result, submitted to Afghan rule.

In 1864, Mir Ataliq returned to Kunduz, and regained control of the region of Qataghan. Mir Ataliq continued to rule the region under Afghan paramountcy, and upon his death in June 1865, the realm passed to his sons. Following Mir Ataliq's return to power, the rule of Qataghan only extended at Jar, which was above Baghlan. The Afghan governor of Badakhshan held direct control over Andarab, Khenjan, Doshi, Nahrin, Baghlan, and Dahan-I-Ghuri.
