= Dushi District =

Dushi دوشی
- District
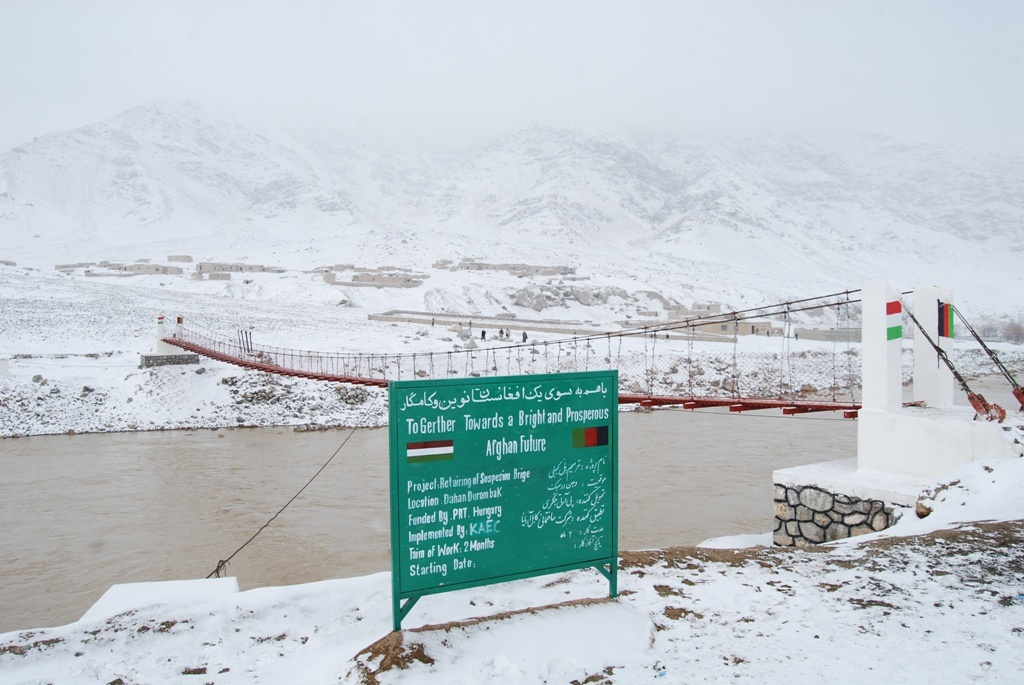
- A pedestrian bridge in the Dushi District of Baghlan province, Afghanistan

- Location within Afghanistan
- Coordinates: 35°37′12″N 68°40′12″E
- Country: Afghanistan
- Province: Baghlan
- Capital: Dushi

Area
  - Total: 1,942.5 km^{2} (750.0 sq mi)
- Elevation: 880 m (2,890 ft)

Population (2004)
  - Total: 57,160
  - Estimate (2019): 74,295

Dushi district (Dari: دوشي) is located in the central part of Baghlan Province, Afghanistan. It lies on the major Kabul-Kunduz highway. The population of the district was estimated to be around 57,160 in 2004. Hazaras are around 60% of the population and make up the majority in the district, followed by Tajiks (39%). The centre of the district is Dushi. Dushi was considered contested between the Afghan Government and the Taliban in late 2018.

== Geography ==
Dushi has an area of 1942.5 square kilometers, comparatively equivalent to the area of Manus Island. Both the Kunduz River and the Andarab River run through the district. They meet near the town of Dushi. The district is located along the Kabul-Kunduz Highway, one of the major roads on which the Taliban have been accused of extorting money from vehicles transporting goods, something the Afghanistan Chamber of Commerce and Investment calls "double payment" of customs duties.

Dushi is bordered by Puli Khumri District to the north, Nahrin District to the northeast, Andarab District and Khinjan District to the east, Tala wa Barfak District to the south, Ruyi Du Ab District to the west, and Dahana i Ghuri District to the north. Ruyi Du Ab is located in Samangan Province, with all other districts in Baghlan Province.

== Electricity transmission ==
Dushi is home to an overhead power line carrying imported electricity from Turkmenistan, Uzbekistan, and Uzbekistan. The 300 MegaWatt supply was the subject of a grant for expansion in 2013 from the Asian Development Bank. The line supplies several provinces and the capital, Kabul. On April 13, 2018, Taliban insurgents used explosives to destroy a pylon, disrupting power supplies to the region.

== See also ==
- Districts of Afghanistan
