= Baglan =

Baglan may refer to:

== Places ==
=== India ===
- Kingdom of Baglana, a small local principality that existed between (1308–1619), in west-central India
- Baglan Taluka, a tehsil in Nashik District, Maharashtra State

=== Turkey ===
- Bağlan, Lice

=== Wales ===
- Baglan, Neath Port Talbot, a village in Neath Port Talbot County Borough
- Baglan (electoral ward), local government electoral area in Neath Port Talbot County Borough
- Baglan Bay, part of Swansea Bay

== People ==
- Saint Baglan, a Welsh saint

== Book ==
- Book of Baglan, Welsh manuscript written by 1607

== See also ==
- Baghlan a city in Afghanistan
- Baghlan Province a province in north-central Afghanistan
- Baghlan District a district of Baghlan Province, Afghanistan
- Baghlani Jadid District a district of Baghlan Province, Afghanistan
- Baghlani Jadid city and capital of Baghlani Jadid District, Afghanistan
