= Aodan =

Aodan Aōdān
- Location in Afghanistan
- Coordinates: 36°45′N 69°21′E
- Country: Afghanistan

'For the similarly named reservoirs in Afghanistan, please see Aodan (reservoir).

Aodan is the name of a village in Afghanistan. It is in Andarab District of Baghlan Province, and located in the Shashan Tagao. Around the turn of the twentieth century, it contained 10 Tajik households.

== See also ==
- Baghlan Province
