= Khwaja Hijran District =

Khwaja Hijran Jalga (Jelga Nahrin)
- District
- Baghlan province in Afghanistan

- Location in Afghanistan
- Coordinates: 35.9713°N 69.2963°E
- Country: Afghanistan
- Province: Baghlan
- Capital: Khvajeh Jeyran

Population (2011)
  - Total: 22,800
- ISO 3166 code: AF-BL-KW
- Languages: Dari; Pashto

Khwaja Hijran is a district in the Baghlan Province of Afghanistan. The district was created in 2005 from part of Andarab District. The name of the district has already been changed and its new one is Jalga. It has a population of about 23,000 (52% male and 48% female), and its main village is Pansíri.
