= Ab-Kol =

Ab Gach Ābgach
- Location in Afghanistan
- Coordinates: 36°31′N 68°43′E
- Country: Afghanistan
- Province: Baghlan Province

Ab Kol is a village in Baghlan Province on the Kunduz River. Around the turn of the 20th century, it was said to contain about 80 houses, all of which were inhabited by Ghilzai. Recent maps no longer show the location however. The nearest approximation is Aq Qol, located at 36.22°N 68.50°E.

== See also ==
- Baghlan Province
