= Shah Kush =

Shahkush
- (Dari: شاه کش)
- Location within Afghanistan

Highest point
- Elevation: 1,796 m (5,892 ft)
- Parent peak: Hindu Kush
- Coordinates: 35°38′16.1″N 69°7′7.2″E

Geography
- Location: near Andarab District Baghlan
- Parent range: Afghanistan

Shahkush (Dari: شاه کش is a mountain in Baghlan in Afghanistan. It is located near the settlement Shah Kush. It is at the coordinates (35° 37' 20.4" N 69° 6' 44.8" E).
