= Dih Salah District =

Dih Salah ده‌صلاح
- District
- Location within Afghanistan
- Coordinates: 35°44′24″N 69°21′36″E
- Country: Afghanistan
- Province: Baghlan
- Elevation: 1,640 m (5,380 ft)

Dih Salah (also spelt Dehe Salah), (Dari: ده‌صلاح) is a district in Baghlan Province, Afghanistan. It was created in 2005 from part of Andarab District, and is situated northeast of the current Andarab District.

Health facilities include; Shah shan Clinic (Basic Health Center), Qasan SC (Sub Health Center) and Deh Salah Clinic (Comprehensive Health Center).

On 23 August 2021, the Taliban captured all three districts that fell to the resistance forces a week ago, including Dih Salah District. On 24 August, according to the Deccan Herald, resistance forces recaptured Dih Salah for the second time.. On 26 August, both sides agreed on a ceasefire and also agreed to solve all problems through dialogue. On the morning of the 25th of October, the National Resistance Front retook the district from the Taliban.
