= Ortospana (town) =

Ancient city of Bactria, probably corresponding to modern Kabul

Ortospana (Greek: Ὀρτόσπάνα) or Cabura (Greek: Κάβουρα) was an ancient city of Bactriana, which there is good reason for supposing is identical with the modern town of Kabul.

== History ==
The name is written variously in ancient authors Ortospana or Ortospanum; the latter is the form adopted by Pliny. Three principal roads leading through Bactriana met at this place; hence the notice in Strabo of the ἡ ἐκ Βάκτρον τρίοδος. The three roads may be, the pass by Bamian, that of the Hindu Kush, and that from Anderab to Khawar.

== See also ==
- Paropamisadae

== Sources ==
- Karttunen, Klaus (2006). "Cabura". In Salazar, Christine F. (ed.). Brill's New Pauly. Brill Publishers. Retrieved 15 May 2022.
- Vaux, W. S. W. (1857). "Ortospana". In Smith, William (ed.). Dictionary of Greek and Roman Geography. Vol. 2: Iabadius–Zymethus. London: Walton and Maberly. pp. 497–498.
