= Kharkush =

Mountain in Afghanistan

- (Dari: خرکش)
- Location within Afghanistan

Highest point
- Elevation: 3,121 m (10,240 ft)
- Parent peak: Hindu Kush
- Coordinates: 35°57′9.9″N 69°34′42.5″E

Geography
- Location: Baghlan province
- Parent range: Hindu Kush

Kharkush (Dari: خرکش) is a mountain of the Hindu Kush mountain range in Baghlan province in northeastern Afghanistan.
