= Dushi, Afghanistan =

Dushi
- Town
- Location in Afghanistan
- Coordinates: 35°36′31″N 68°41′9″E
- Country: Afghanistan
- Province: Baghlan Province
- District: Dushi District
- Time zone: + 4.30

Dushi (Dari: دوشی), also spelled Doshi or Dowshi, is a town in Dushi District, Baghlan Province, Afghanistan. It is the administrative center of Dushi District and is located on the major Kabul-Kunduz highway.

== Geography ==
The town is located in the lower valleys of the Hindu Kush mountain range and at the confluence of the Andarab and Kunduz rivers. The rivers give the area a fertile pocket for agriculture. The town sits on the Kabul-Kunduz highway making the town a regional trading hub.

== See also ==
- Dushi District
- Baghlan Province
