= Cheshmeh-ye Shir =

- Location in Afghanistan
- Coordinates: 36°4′3″N 68°35′21″E
- Country: Afghanistan
- Province: Baghlan Province
- Time zone: + 4.30

Cheshmeh-ye Shir is a village in Baghlan Province in north eastern Afghanistan.

== See also ==
- Baghlan Province
