= Baghlani Jadid =

- Location in Afghanistan
- Coordinates: 36°10′35″N 68°44′55″E
- Country: Afghanistan
- Province: Baghlan Province
- District: Baghlani Jadid District
- Time zone: + 4.30

Baghlani Jadid is the main city of the district of Baghlani Jadid, Baghlan Province, in north-central Afghanistan. It is located in the valley of the Kunduz River, just east of the main Kunduz-Kabul all-weather highway.

== See also ==
- Baghlan Province
