= Khvajeh Jeyran =

- Location in Afghanistan
- Coordinates: 36°2′24″N 69°15′4″E
- Country: Afghanistan
- Province: Baghlan Province
- Time zone: + 4.30

Khvajeh Jeyran is a village in Baghlan Province in north eastern Afghanistan.

== See also ==
- Baghlan Province
