= Dilawar Ahmadzay =

Afghan footballer

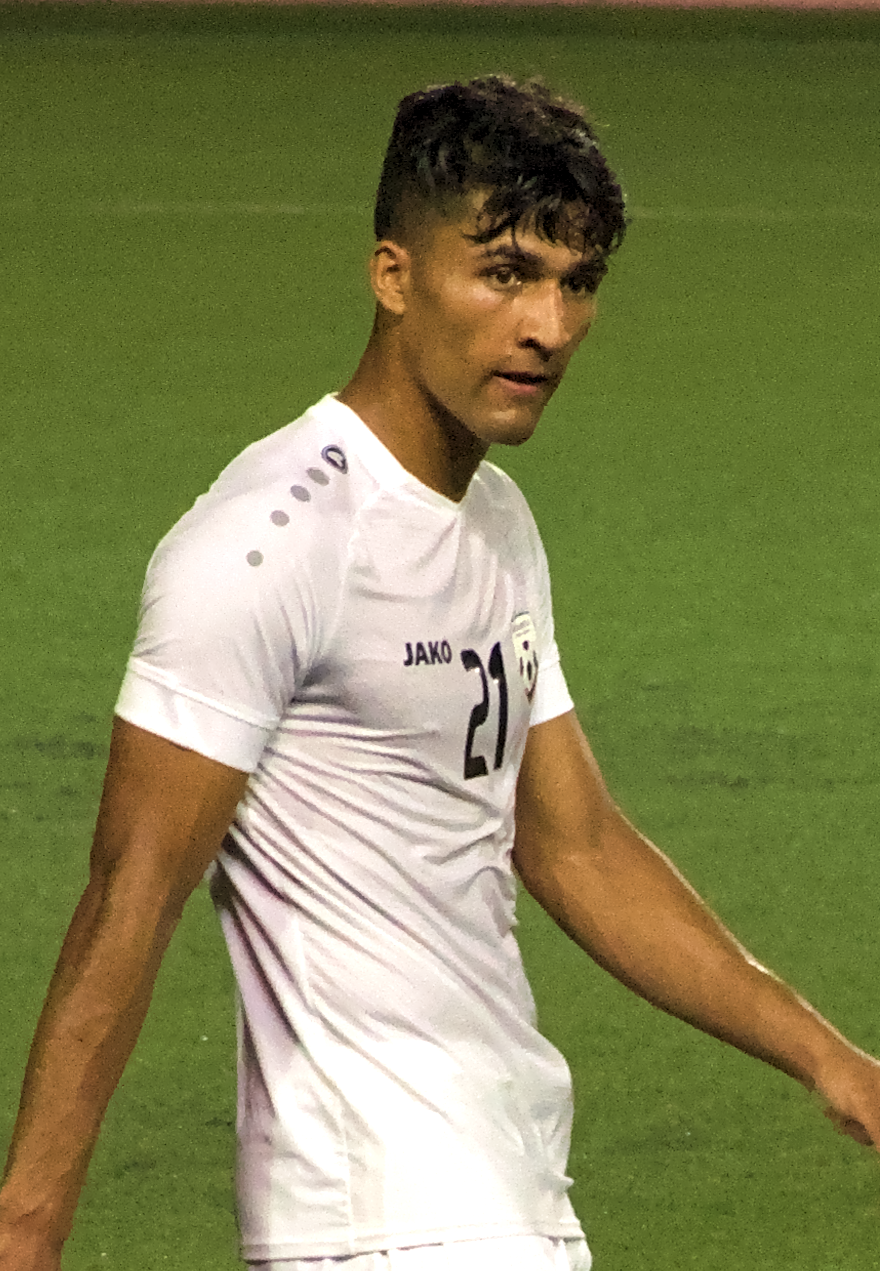
- Ahmadzay in 2023

Personal information
- Date of birth: 4 April 2004 (age 22)
- Place of birth: Baghlan, Afghanistan
- Height: 1.78 m (5 ft 10 in)
- Position: Forward

Team information
- Current team: Grorud IL
- Number: 14

Youth career
- –2018: Stoppen
- 2018–2021: Strømsgodset

Senior career*
Years	Team	Apps	(Gls)
2021–2023	Strømsgodset 2	50	(23)
2024–2025	Åskollen FK	20	(5)
2025	Åssiden IF	10	(8)
2025–	Grorud IL	2	(0)

International career^{‡}
2023–	Afghanistan	2	(0)
- * Club domestic league appearances and goals as of 3 November 2025 ‡ National team caps and goals as of 19 September 2023

Dilawar Ahmadzay (Persian: دلاور احمدزی; born 4 April 2004) is an Afghan footballer who currently plays for Norwegian 2. divisjon club Grorud IL and the Afghanistan national team.

== Club career ==
As a youth, Ahmadzay was a member of Stoppen SK before joining the academy of Eliteserien club Strømsgodset in 2018. At age 17, he made his competitive senior debut for the club on 25 July 2021 in a 2–0 victory over Hønefoss in the 2021–22 Norwegian Football Cup. He entered the match as a 72nd-minute substitute for Kristoffer Tokstad.

== International career ==
In July 2023 Ahmadzay was called up to the Afghanistan national team by head coach Abdullah Al Mutairi for a training camp to determine the nation's squad for the upcoming 2026 FIFA World Cup qualification and 2023 AFC Asian Cup qualification matches. He was then included in Afghanistan's squad for another training camp and a pair of friendlies against Bangladesh in September 2023. He made his debut on 3 September in the first of the two contests.

=== International career statistics ===
As of 13 June 2023

Afghanistan national team
Year	Apps	Goals
2023	2	0
Total	2	0
