= Baghlani Jadid District =

Baghlani Jadid بغلان جدید
- District
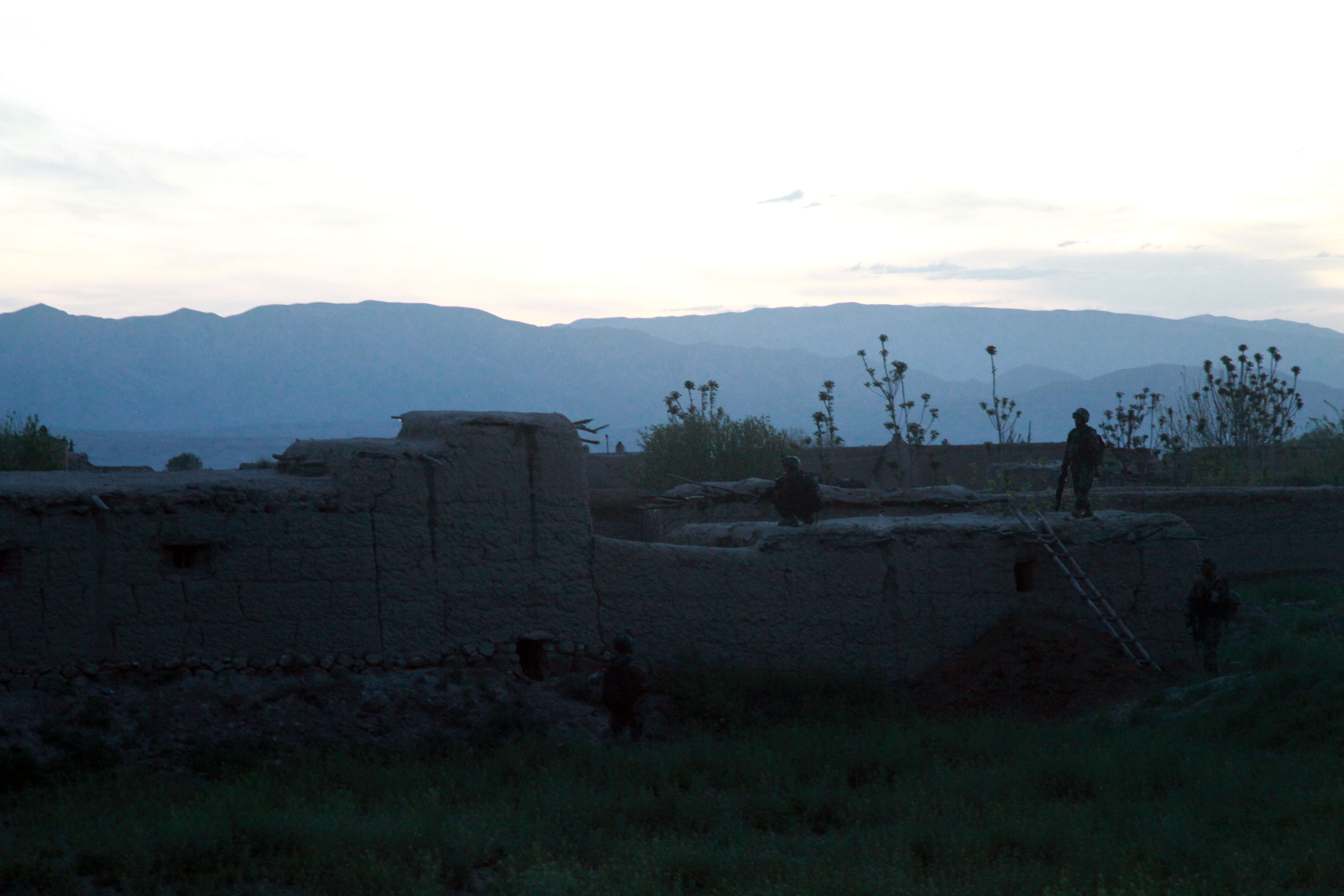

- Location within Afghanistan
- Coordinates: 36°19′48″N 68°37′12″E
- Country: Afghanistan
- Province: Baghlan

Area
  - Total: 1,613 km^{2} (623 sq mi)

Population (2004)
  - Total: 119,607

Baghlani Jadid (Pashto: بغلان جدید), (surface: 1,613 km^{2}) is a district of Baghlan Province in northern Afghanistan. It has a population of about 119,607.

== Geography ==
The district is situated in the northernmost part of the province. It borders Kunduz Province to the north and Samangan Province to the west . Most of the population live in the valley of the Kunduz River. The majority of its territory is uninhabited mountain ranges. An all-weather Kunduz-Kabul highway passes through the district from north to south. The main city is Baghlani Jadid. In 2005, Baghlani Jadid absorbed the district of Baghlan-e-Markazi, also in Baghlan Province, to create a new and bigger Baghlani Jadid district.

== Demographics ==
According to Afghanistan's Ministry of Rural Rehabilitation and Development, the population of the district was estimated to be around 119,607 in 2004. Ethnically, Pashtuns are around 50% of the population and make up the majority in the district, followed by Tajiks at 40% and Uzbeks make up the remaining 10%.
