= Khenjan =

- Location in Afghanistan
- Coordinates: 35°35′8″N 68°54′9″E
- Country: Afghanistan
- Province: Baghlan Province
- Time zone: + 4.30

Khenjan is a village in Khinjan District of Baghlan Province in north eastern Afghanistan.

== See also ==
- Baghlan Province
