= Puli Khumri District =

Puli Khumri پل خمری
- District
- Location within Afghanistan
- Country: Afghanistan
- Province: Baghlan
- Capital: Puli Khumri

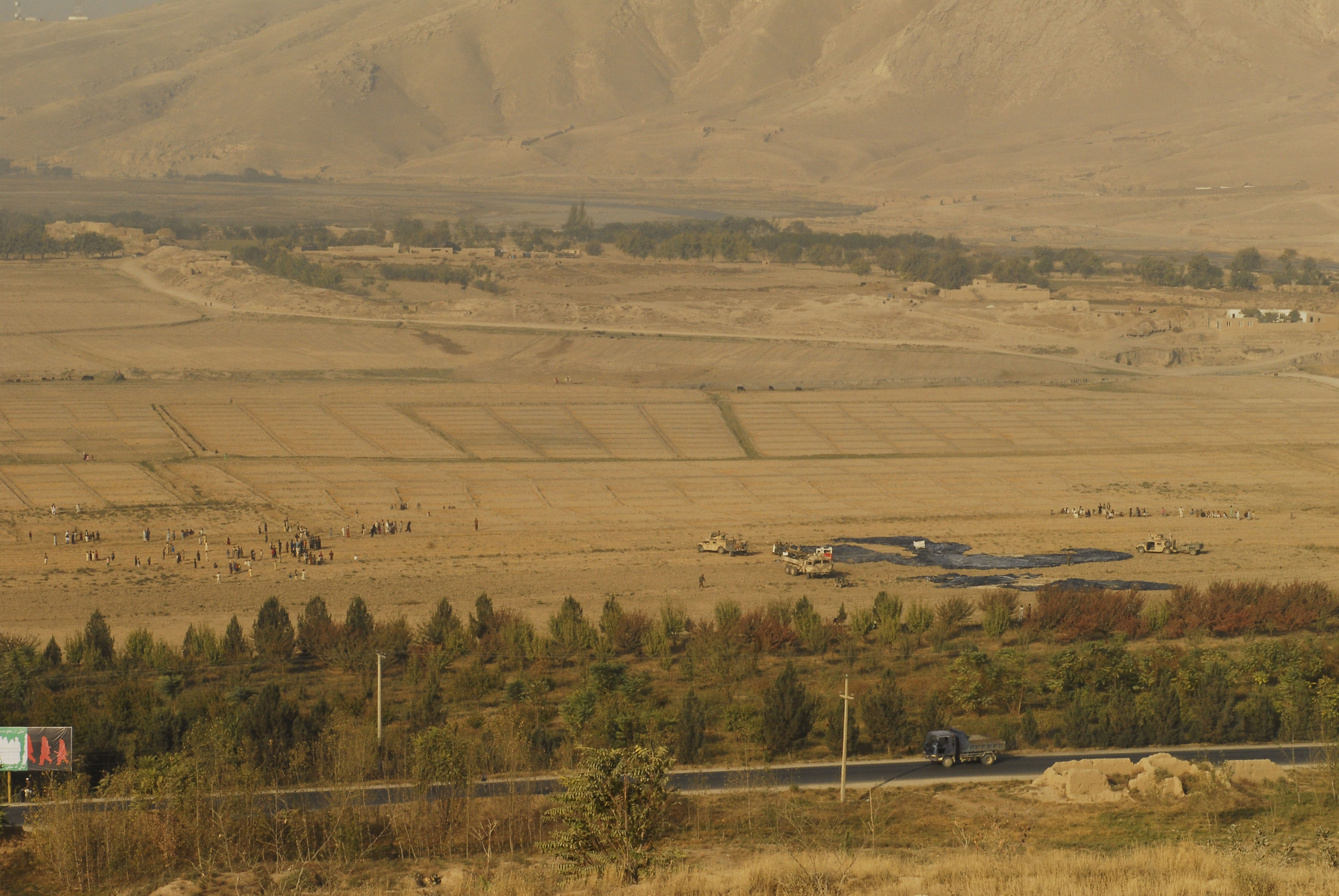
The district

Puli Khumri, also spelled Pul-i-Khumri or Pol-e Khomri, (Dari: پل خمری) is a district of Baghlan province, Afghanistan.

== Demographics ==
The population of the district was estimated to be around 191,640 in 2004. Tajiks are around 50% of the population and make up the majority in the district, followed by 30% Hazaras, 15% Pashtuns and 5% Uzbeks. The capital city is Puli Khumri.

== See also ==
- Baghlan
