= Baghlan District =

Former district of Baghlan Province, Afghanistan

Baghlan was a district in Baghlan Province, Afghanistan. The main town of the district was also known as Baghlan. In 2005, Baghlan was annexed into the district of Baghlani Jadid, also in Baghlan Province.

== See also ==
- Baghlan (Baghlan is a Persian word that comes from two words bagh (fire) and lan (house). it means firehouse; it was center of Zerdushtism before Islam.

Baghlan district was the center of Baghlan province until 1990, but now it is a district of Baghlan province, and the center of Baghlan province is Pulikhumri. Baghlan district has around 20,000 population; its residents are Tajik, Hazara, Uzbeks and Pashtuns.
