= Kunduz Khanate =

Historical Central Asian state

The Kunduz Khanate (Persian: خاندان قندوز; Turki: قندوز خانلیغی), also known as the Khanate of Qunduz or the Emirate of Kunduz, was a historical Uzbek state in northern Afghanistan. It reached the apex of its power under Muhammad Murad Beg. The Khanate was eventually conquered by Afghanistan in 1859. In 1888, it was abolished by Abdur Rahman Khan.
