= Aodan (reservoir) =

Reservoir in Afghanistan

- Location in Afghanistan
- Location: Northern Afghanistan
- Coordinates: 36°41′59.6″N 67°50′24.2″E
- Type: Reservoirs

Aodan is the name of three reservoirs in Afghanistan on the road from Khulm (Tashkurgan) to Kunduz, and another one on the road from Kunduz to Hazrat Imam. Taken as a whole, these reservoirs had been the only water reservoirs available between Kunduz and the Hazrat Imam.
