= Nahrin District =

Nahrin نهرین
- District
- Location within Afghanistan
- Coordinates: 36°00′00″N 69°01′48″E
- Country: Afghanistan
- Province: Baghlan

Population (2014)
  - Total: 107,509

Nahrin (Dari: نهرین) is a district in the central part of Baghlan province in Afghanistan. To the west lie the major towns of Baghlan and Puli Khumri. The district centre is Nahrin. The population of the district was estimated to be around 57,509 in 2004, of which 60% are Tajiks, 35% Pashtun and 5% Uzbeks.

== 2002 earthquakes ==
On 25 March 2002, a major earthquake shook Nahrin District, causing significant loss of life and enormous damage to infrastructure and water resources. The earthquake measured 5.9 on the Richter scale with the epicentre almost directly on Nahrin City, at the relatively shallow depth of 33 km. A second earthquake hit Nahrin on 12 April 2002. More damage was brought to an already devastated area of Nahrin City, while at the same time heavily damaging several additional villages. The region also experienced three years of ruinous drought.
