= Khost wa Fereng District =

Khost wa Fereng خوست و فرنگ
- District
- Location within Afghanistan
- Coordinates: 35°54′00″N 69°40′12″E
- Country: Afghanistan
- Province: Baghlan
- Capital: Khost wa Fereng

Khost wa Fereng or Khost wa Firing (Dari: خوست و فرنگ) is the easternmost district of Baghlan province, Afghanistan in the Hindu Kush mountains. Its capital is Khost wa Fereng. The population of the district was estimated to be around 60,300 in 2011–2012, of which ethnic Tajiks made up 90% and Hazaras 10% of the total population. The district was part of Takhar Province until 1970.

District profile:

- Health: 1 clinic
- Income: farming (50%), animal husbandry (20%), gardening (20%), shopkeepers (4%)
- Schools: 10 home based, 14 primary, 3 high schools

Most of the people of Khost wa Firing speak Dari Persian.

All people of Khost wa Firing are Sunni Hanafi. Afghan Encyclopedia added: that Mirza Abdul Qadir Bedul originally belongs to this district, upon certain issues he left to India and became the royal poet of Awrangzib king of subcontenant, due to that two daughter of Awrangzib had married in the district, when he was sending any gift to Khurasan, making particular the khost district due to that reason of his daughters. noted by Sayed Zakaria hashimi.

The people of Khost wa Firing are Muslims. Most of them are Mujahid, and they belong to Jamiat-e Islami party. The people of Khost wa Firing are called kosti or khusti. According to Islamic books the Imam Mehdi rises from Taliqan which is near to Khost wa Firing and his flowers are called by the name of Khosti which is the name of their original place. Therefore, Islamic forecasts say that people of Khost wa Firing which are called Khosti are the first followers and soldiers of Imam Mehdi.
