= Dahana-e-Ghuri District =

Dahana i Ghuri دهنه غوری
- District
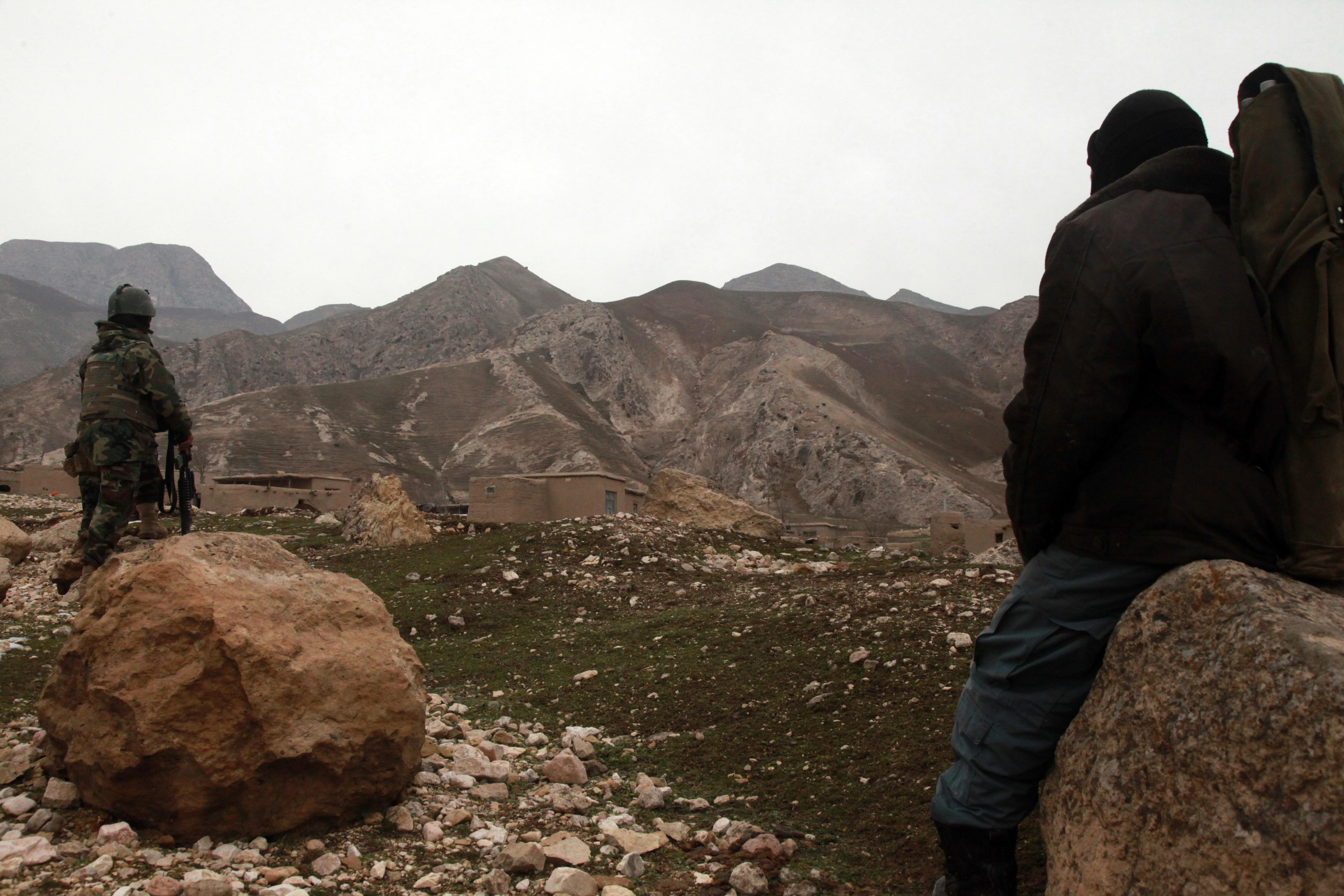

- Location within Afghanistan
- Coordinates: 35°49′12″N 68°27′36″E
- Country: Afghanistan
- Province: Baghlan

Area
  - Total: 1,468 km^{2} (567 sq mi)
- Elevation: 780 m (2,560 ft)

Population (2011)
  - Total: 86,400

Dahana Ghuri district (Pashto: دهنه غوري) (pop: 86,400) is located in the most southwestern part of Baghlan province, Afghanistan. The capital is Dahana i Ghuri (also:Dahaneh-ye Ġawri, Dahana Gori, Dahana Ghori, Dahaneh-ye Ghowri). Its population is about 3,400 people. It is connected with Baghlan and Puli Khumri with an all-weather primary road.

District profile:

- Villages: 105
- Schools: 18 primary, 7 secondary, 11 high schools
- Health centers: 2 basic, 1 comprehensive

== Economy ==
The majority of residents are engaged in farming and animal breeding. Main agricultural products include: wheat, barley, sesame, Zaghar, melon and water melon. Animals include: cow, sheep, donkey, horse and birds.

== History ==
The district was captured by the Taliban on 15 August 2016 after days of fighting with Afghan forces.
