= Khinjan District =

Khinjan District ولسوالی خنجان / خنجان ولسوالۍ
- District
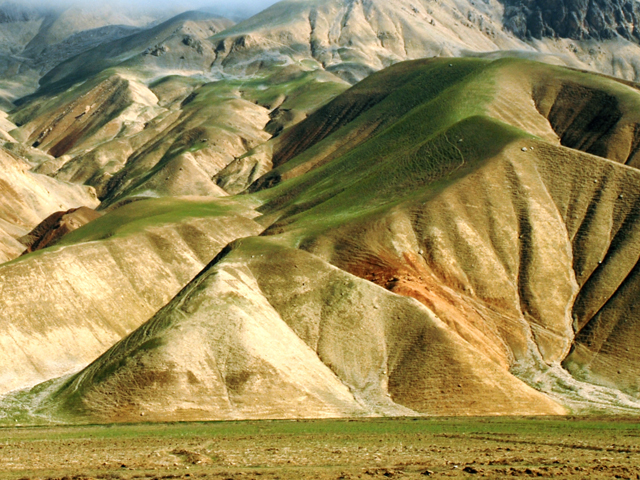
- Khinjan mountains overview

- Location within Afghanistan
- Coordinates: 35°28′12″N 68°58′12″E
- Country: Afghanistan
- Province: Baghlan
- Center: Khenjan
- Elevation: 1,050 m (3,440 ft)

Population (2025)
  - Total: 37,502
- Time zone: UTC+04:30 (Afghanistan Time)

Khinjan District (Dari: ولسوالی خنجان; Pashto: خنجان ولسوالۍ) is one of the 16 districts of Baghlan Province in northeastern Afghanistan. It has an estimated population of about 37,502 people, with ethnic Tajiks being the majority followed by Pashtuns, Hazaras, Uzbeks, and others.

Khinjan District is located in the southern part of the province in the Hindu Kush mountains. The town of Khenjan serves as the district's administrative center. The main Kabul-Kunduz Highway passes through the district from south to west.

== See also ==
- Districts of Afghanistan
- Baghlan Province
