= Andarab =

River in Afghanistan

Coordinates: 35°36′N 68°41′E

Andarab is the name of a large stream in Afghanistan and of the valley it empties into.

The stream originates in the Hindu Kush, near Khawak Pass, and flows to the west for about 75 miles before merging into the Surkhab.

== Andarab valley ==
Together, the two streams form a long, narrow valley. The upper part of that valley is also called Andarab, the lower part alternately as Khinjan or Doshi. Both parts of the valley had been united governmentally under a single leader, or hakim, who lived at Bannu, in modern-day Pakistan.

The climate in the two parts of the valley varies considerably. Khinjan and Doshi have comparatively mild winters, while Andarab's winter is rather severe. However, Andarab stays comparatively cooler during the summer, though it gets quite hot in Khinjan and Doshi.

At the turn of the 20th century, it was estimated that there were about 2,600 families living in the Andarab valley and the latest population statistics are not available. At that time, it was estimated that the Andarab valley could produce 1200 maunds of atta and rice, and up to 2,000 maunds of barley.
