= Andarab District =

Andarab اندراب
- District
- Location within Afghanistan
- Coordinates: 35°37′42″N 69°10′38″E
- Country: Afghanistan
- Province: Baghlan

Population (2004)
  - Total: 120,642

Andarab (Dari: اندراب) is a district located in the southern part of Baghlan Province, Afghanistan. The estimated population of Andarab in 2004 was roughly 120,642. The district centre is the village of Andarab, which is named after the Andarab valley in which it is located.

== History ==
Andarab district is one of the three districts recaptured by the National Resistance Front of Afghanistan after the Taliban took over Kabul. On 24 August 2021, according to the Deccan Herald, it was recaptured by the second resistance. The next day, the claim by the anti-Taliban resistance that they had recaptured Andarab was reported by BBC reporter Yalda Hakim, without verifying it, on her Twitter page. On 26 August, both sides agreed on a ceasefire and also agreed to solve all problems through dialogue. At the time Taliban claimed to have taken Panjshir Province on September 6, 2021, the National Resistance Front and local tribal militias were still reported to have retaken the Andarab District and two other adjoining districts in Baghlan. On September 7, fighting was still reported in the district.

== Climate ==
Andarab has a warm-summer humid continental climate (Köppen climate classification Dsb). In Winter there is more rainfall than in summer. The average annual temperature in Andarab is 7.0 °C (44.6 °F). About 619 mm (24.37 in) of precipitation falls annually.

Climate data for Andarab, elevation: 1,494 metres (4,901.6 ft)
Month	Jan	Feb	Mar	Apr	May	Jun	Jul	Aug	Sep	Oct	Nov	Dec	Year
Mean daily maximum °C (°F)	−2.2 (28.0)	−1.4 (29.5)	4.7 (40.5)	11.7 (53.1)	17.9 (64.2)	21.8 (71.2)	24.5 (76.1)	24.0 (75.2)	20.7 (69.3)	15.1 (59.2)	7.1 (44.8)	0.5 (32.9)	12.0 (53.7)
Daily mean °C (°F)	−6.3 (20.7)	−5.1 (22.8)	0.4 (32.7)	6.2 (43.2)	12.0 (53.6)	16.6 (61.9)	19.5 (67.1)	18.9 (66.0)	15.4 (59.7)	9.7 (49.5)	1.7 (35.1)	−4.5 (23.9)	7.0 (44.7)
Mean daily minimum °C (°F)	−10.3 (13.5)	−8.8 (16.2)	−4.0 (24.8)	0.7 (33.3)	6.0 (42.8)	11.3 (52.3)	14.5 (58.1)	13.7 (56.7)	10.0 (50.0)	4.2 (39.6)	−3.8 (25.2)	−9.4 (15.1)	2.0 (35.6)
Average precipitation mm (inches)	56 (2.2)	77 (3.0)	100 (3.9)	104 (4.1)	96 (3.8)	39 (1.5)	10 (0.4)	4 (0.2)	13 (0.5)	37 (1.5)	42 (1.7)	41 (1.6)	619 (24.4)
Source: climate-data.org
