= Baghlan Province =

Province of Afghanistan

Baghlan ولایت بغلان (Dari) د بغلان ولایت (Pashto)
- Province
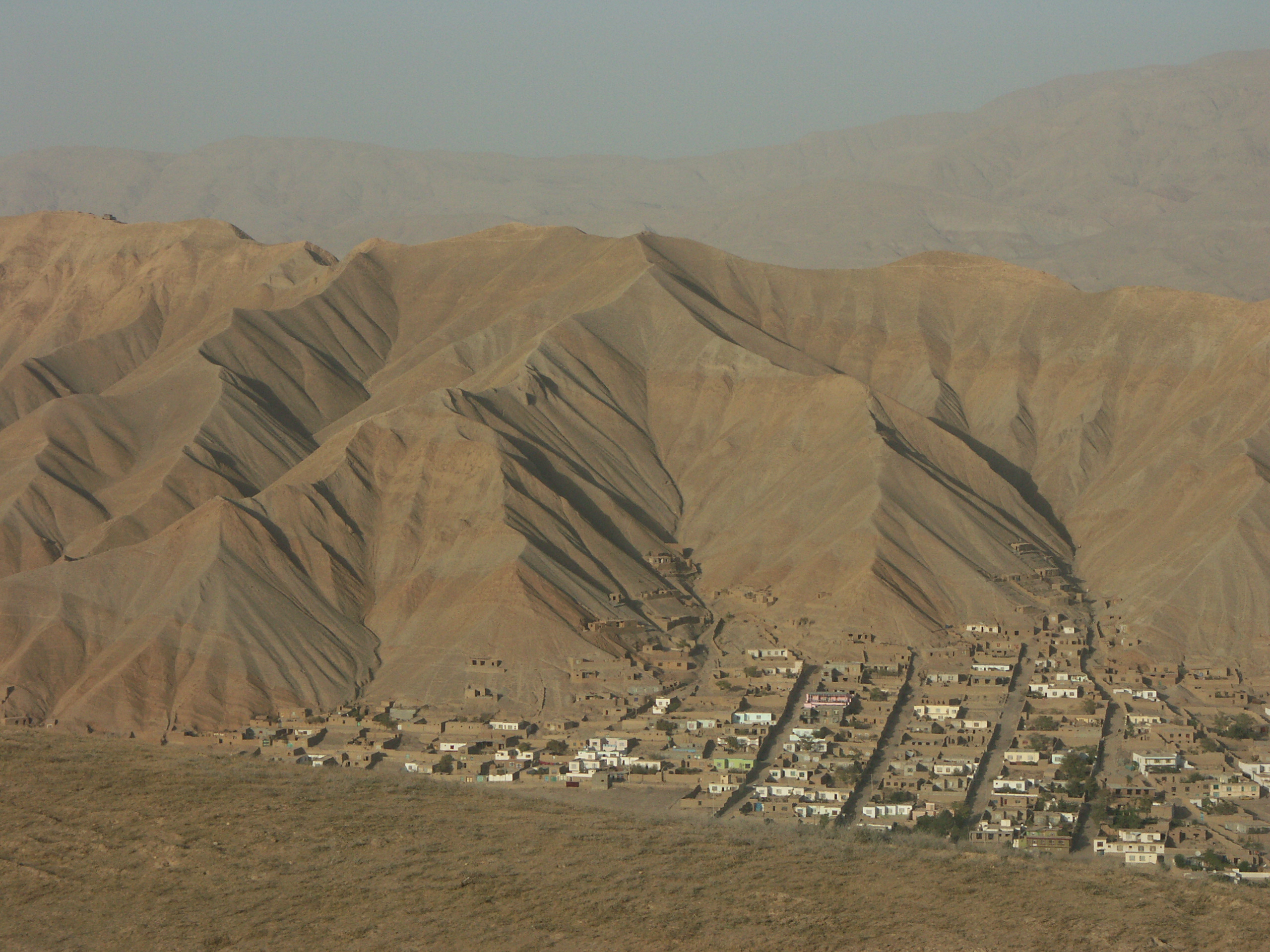
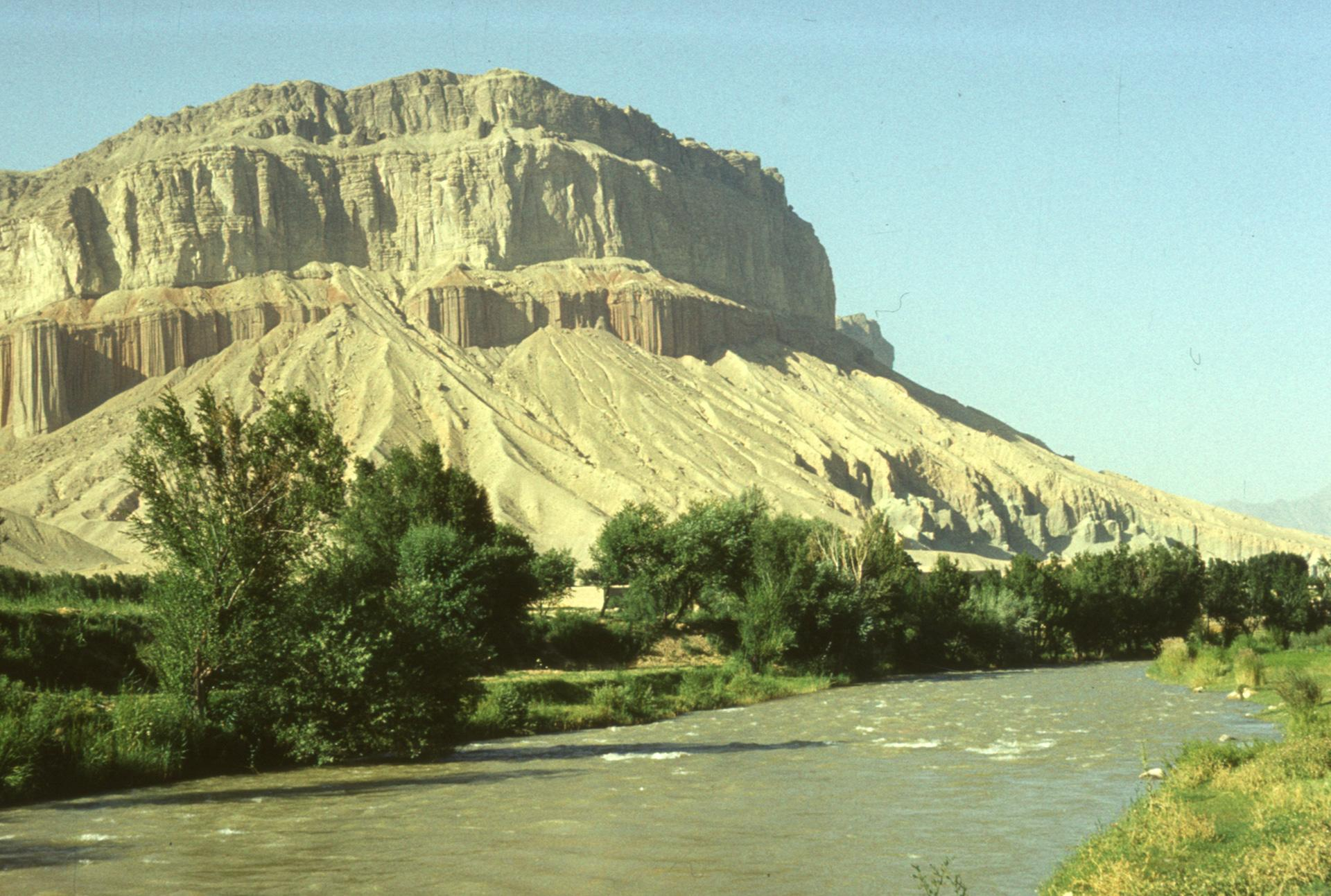
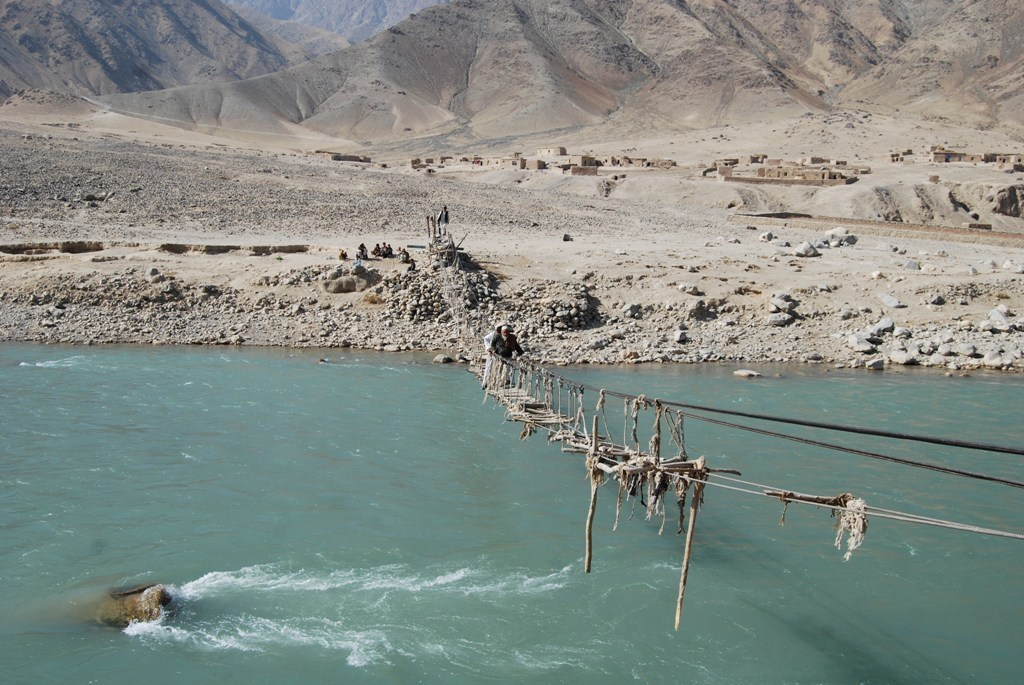
- From the top, Pul-e Khumri, Tala wa Barfak District, Dushi District, Kayan, Baghlan

- Map of Afghanistan with Baghlan highlighted
- Coordinates (Capital): 36°N 69°E
- Country: Afghanistan
- Established: 30 April 1964
- Capital: Pul-e Khumri

Government
  - Governor: Mawlawi Abdulah Mokhtar

Area
  - Total: 21,118 km^{2} (8,154 sq mi)

Population (2023)
  - Total: c. 1.1 million
  - Density: 52.1/km^{2} (135/sq mi)
- Demonym: Baghlani
- Time zone: UTC+4:30 (Afghanistan Time)
- Postal code: 36xx
- ISO 3166 code: AF-BGL
- Main languages: Dari, Pashto

Baghlan (Dari: ولایت بغلان, romanized: Wilāyat-e Baghlān and Pashto: د بغلان ولایت, romanized: Da Baghlān Wilāyat) is one of the northern provinces of Afghanistan. It is bordered by Samangan to the west, Kunduz to the northeast, Takhar to the east, Bamyan to the southwest, and Parwan and Panjshir to the south. The provincial capital is Pul-e Khumri, which functions as the main administrative, economic, and population center of the province.

Covering an area of approximately 21,100 square kilometers and having an estimated population of about 1.1 million people (as of 2025), Baghlan is characterized by a varied physical geography. The northern part of the province consists largely of fertile plains suitable for intensive agriculture, while the southern part is dominated by mountainous terrain associated with the eastern extensions of the Hindu Kush. Several rivers and tributaries belonging to the Kunduz River basin traverse the province and play a central role in agricultural production, settlement distribution, and local water management.

Historically, Baghlan formed part of regional communication and trade networks linking Central Asia with the interior regions of what is now Afghanistan. Archaeological and historical evidence indicates long-term human settlement in the area. During the twentieth century, particularly in the period of state-driven economic modernization, Baghlan became a location for large-scale industrial projects, including sugar production in Baghlan-e Jadid as well as textile and cement factories in the Pul-e Khumri area. These developments contributed to population growth, urbanization, and changes in the economic structure of the province.

Today, Baghlan is characterized by a predominantly rural population alongside several urban and semi-urban centers, a mixed economy based primarily on agriculture and industry, and ethnically and linguistically diverse communities. Large parts of the province have been affected by decades of conflict, which have influenced infrastructure development, economic conditions, governance, and social life. Despite these challenges, Baghlan continues to function as an important transit region linking northern Afghanistan with the central regions of the country.

== Etymology ==
The name Baghlan is possibly derived from the Bactrian term bagolango, meaning "image-temple", which originates from the Old Iranian root baga danaka (Old Persian: 𐬠𐬀𐬖𐬀-𐬛𐬁𐬥𐬀𐬑𐬀, romanized: *baga-dānaka-), referring to a sanctuary or divine shrine, inscribed on the temple of Surkh Kotal during the reign of the Kushan emperor Kanishka in the early 2nd century CE. The name is generally understood to have evolved phonetically into Baghlan. Other sources describe that the Chinese Buddhist monk Xuanzang traveled through Baghlan in the mid-7th century CE, and referred to it as the "kingdom of Fo-kia-lang".

== History ==
=== Antiquity ===
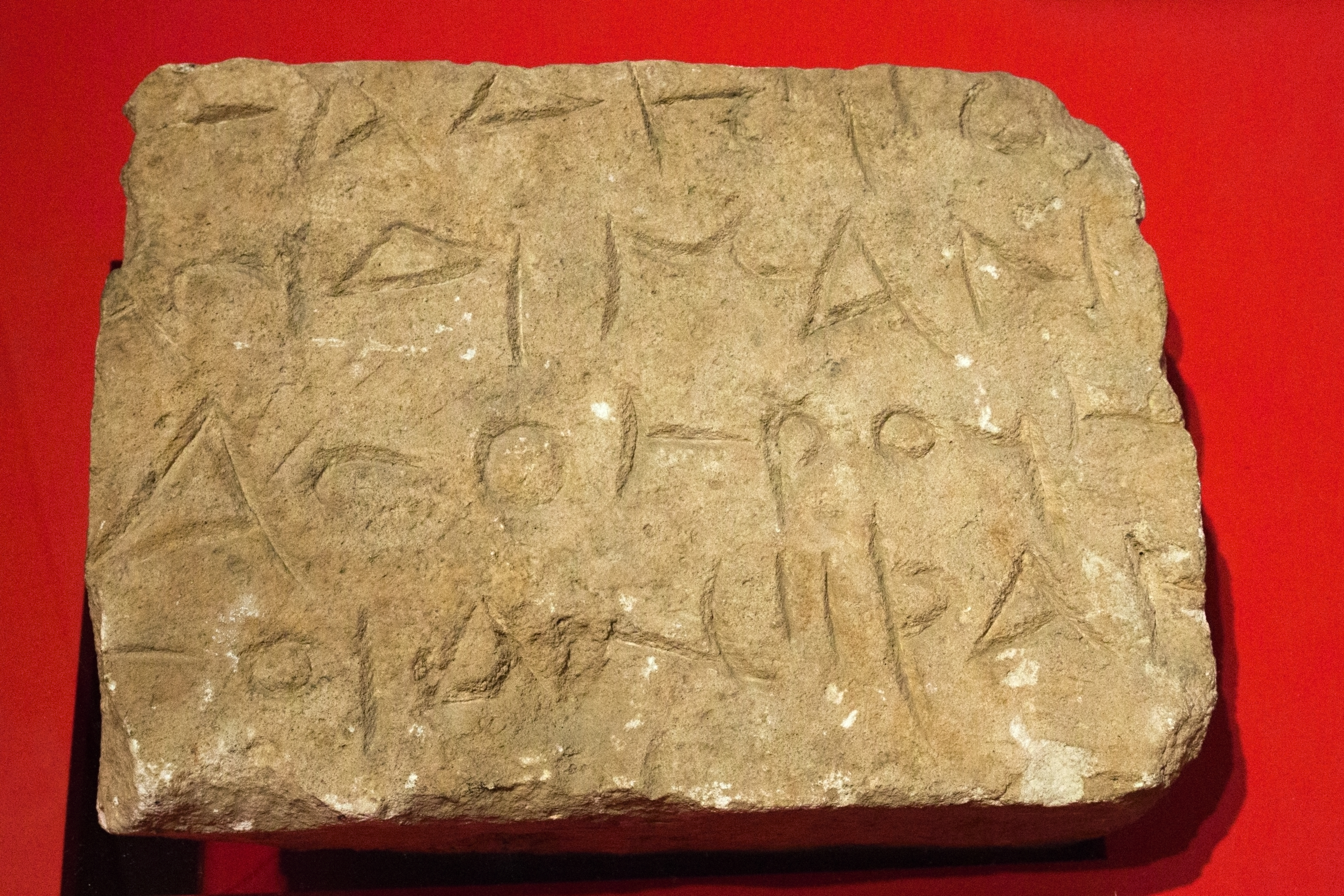
Fragment of a Bactrian text in limestone from 2nd century BC, found in Surkh Kotal

The area of present-day Baghlan has been inhabited since at least the 1st millennium BC and formed part of the broader historical region of Bactria. Archaeological evidence indicates the existence of complex administrative and religious structures during the Kushan period (1st–3rd centuries CE). Baghlan's location along trade routes linking Central Asia with the Indian subcontinent facilitated the movement of goods, people, and cultural practices, integrating it into the wider economic and cultural networks of ancient Bactria. Archaeological finds, including coins, pottery, and religious artifacts, indicate active engagement with Kushan and pre-Kushan urban and ritual traditions. The local population engaged in a combination of agriculture in the fertile northern plains and pastoralism in the southern hills, reflecting a dual economy shaped by geography.

=== Medieval times ===
During the early medieval period, Baghlan was incorporated into successive regional empires and dynasties, including the Hephthalites in the 5th to 8th centuries, the Samanids in the 9th and 10th centuries, and later the Ghaznavids and Ghurids. In the 13th century, a permanent Mongol garrison in the Kunduz-Baghlan area, initially under Sali Noyan and later his descendants, formed the Qara'unas faction, which remained influential through the Timurid period and was noted in 1494–1495 CE as ruled by a Qipchaq emir. The position of the region along routes connecting northern Afghanistan to the central highlands and to the regions of modern-day Tajikistan and Uzbekistan made it an important corridor for trade, military campaigns, and cultural exchange.

Islamic influence gradually spread during this period, bringing the establishment of mosques, madrasas, and administrative offices, while local populations retained a mixture of agrarian and pastoral livelihoods. Settlements expanded along river valleys, and irrigation networks were developed to support crop cultivation. The presence of small towns facilitated local trade, artisanal production, and the administration of surrounding rural districts, creating a pattern of semi-urban centers surrounded by agricultural hinterlands.

=== Early modern period ===
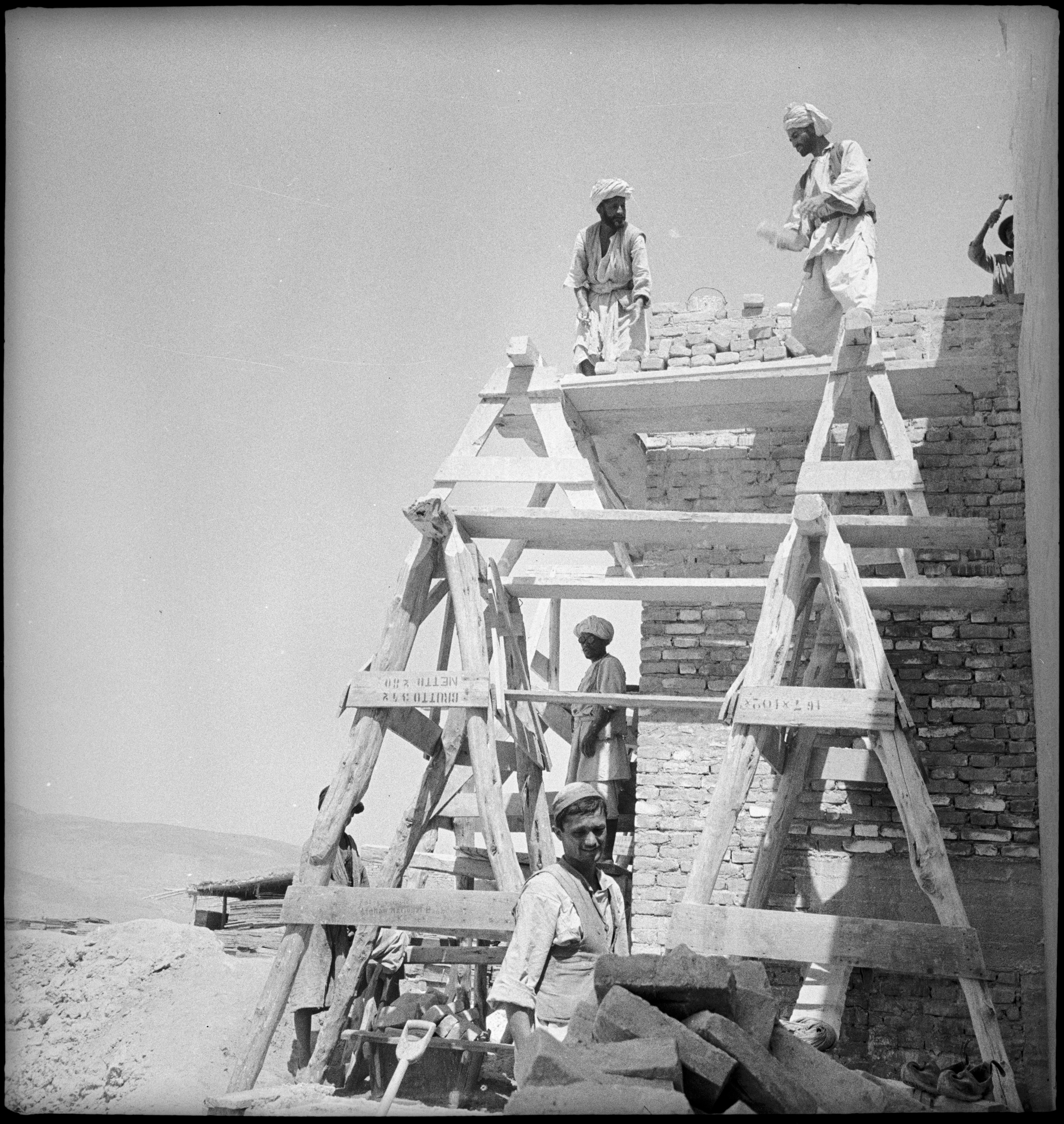
Baghlani men at a construction site (c. 1939)

Baghlan became part of the Durrani Empire in the mid-18th century and remained predominantly agrarian, with villages concentrated along rivers such as the Kunduz and its tributaries. Small towns, including Baghlan-e Jadid and Pul-e Khumri, served as local administrative and trade centers, and early industrial activities such as sugar production and textile workshops were established there.

During the 20th century, the province saw further economic development through industrial and agricultural projects, including the expansion of sugar production, vegetable oil facilities, and coal mining, contributing to the growth of urban centers. In 1964, the modern Baghlan Province was officially created from the former Qataghan Province, formalizing administrative structures and marking a period of increased urbanization and economic integration in the region.

=== During war times (1979–2021) ===
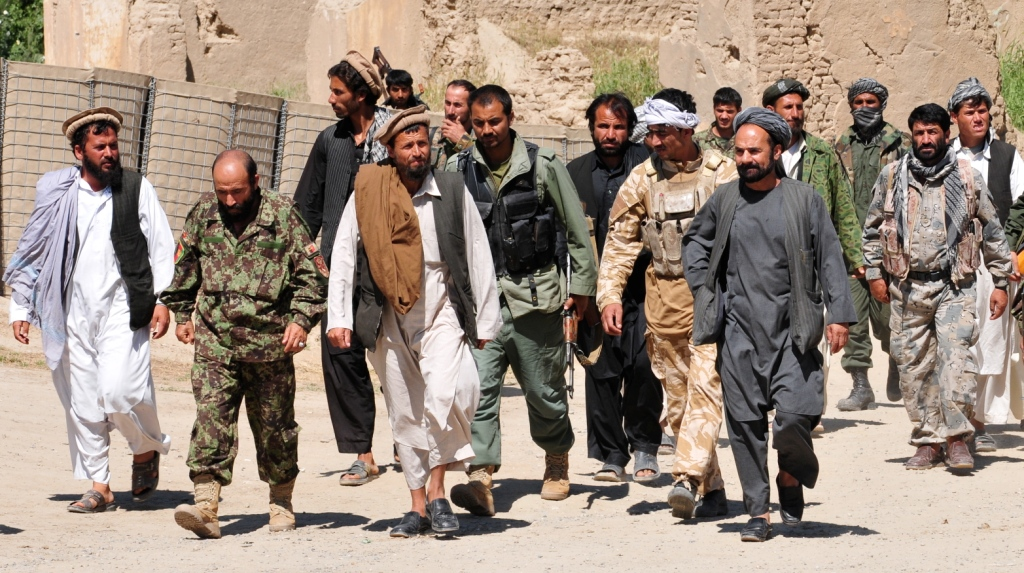
Afghan National Security Forces at a forward operating base in Baghlan-e Jadid (2010)

Baghlan was heavily affected by the Soviet–Afghan War and the subsequent decades of conflict. During the 1980s, parts of the province were controlled by militias aligned with the Soviet-backed government, which maintained limited stability, local administration, schools, and hospitals, while other areas experienced armed clashes, insecurity, and population displacement. The provincial capital was moved from Baghlan to Pul-e Khumri during this period to improve governance and access. After the Soviet withdrawal from Afghanistan, Baghlan experienced continued instability during the civil war of the 1990s, as different factions, including government forces and local militias, competed for control. During the period of Taliban rule and following the 2001 NATO-led intervention, the province remained strategically significant due to its location along major transport routes connecting northern and central Afghanistan. Infrastructure, including roads, factories, and public services, suffered from prolonged conflict, and many communities faced displacement and economic disruption.

=== Today (since 2021) ===
Since 2021, Baghlan has been under the control of the Taliban following their nationwide takeover of Afghanistan. The provincial administration has been reorganized according to the structures of the Islamic Emirate, with key local government positions replaced by Taliban appointees. Security remains a concern, particularly in more remote districts, where resistance from local militias or rival groups occasionally emerges.

== Geography ==
Baghlan is located in northern Afghanistan and occupies a strategic position along key transport routes connecting the central highlands with the northern plains. The province is characterized by a combination of mountains, river valleys, and agricultural plains. Its varied terrain has shaped settlement patterns, economic activities, and local culture.

=== Landscape ===
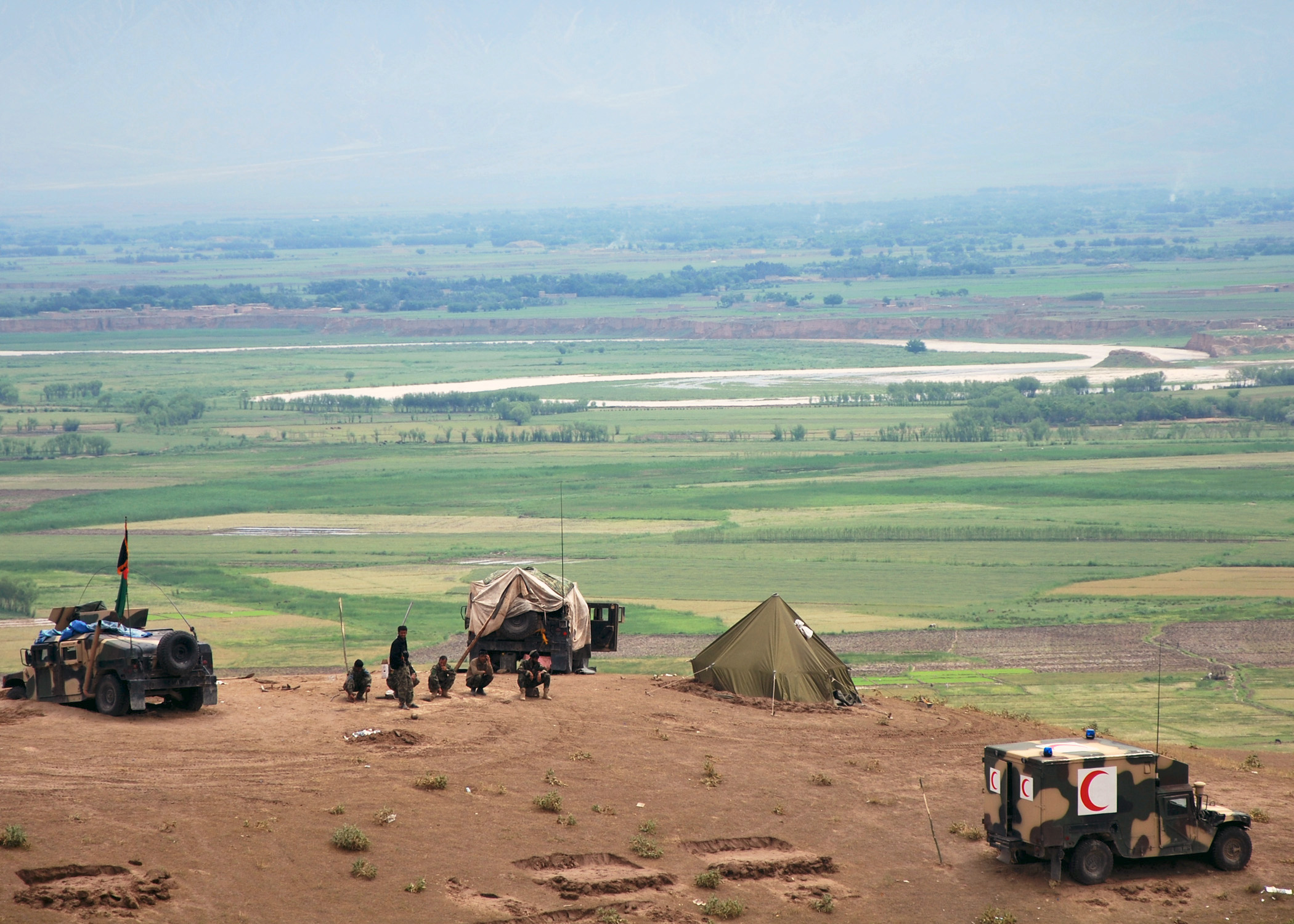
Plain flatlands in Baghlan (2011)

Baghlan's landscape is dominated by mountain ranges that are part of the Hindu Kush system, with large areas lying above 2,000 meters. Several peaks exceed 4,000 meters, while lower valleys are used for agriculture and settlement. The province is traversed by several important rivers, including the Kunduz river, which flows northward toward the Amu Darya basin, and its tributaries, which create fertile valleys for farming, and the Andarab river. Settlements are typically concentrated along riverbanks and alluvial terraces, while many mountainous areas are accessible only via passes, which can be impassable during winter.

=== Flora and fauna ===
Baghlan hosts a mix of vegetation types, from coniferous forests at lower elevations to alpine meadows and grasslands in the mountains. Common trees include pine, juniper, and mulberry, while fruit and nut trees such as apples, walnuts, and almonds grow in river valleys. Wildlife in the province includes species adapted to mountainous environments, such as ibex, markhor, wolves, snow leopards, and various birds of prey. Human activity, including agriculture, grazing, and hunting, has affected some populations, but remote areas remain important habitats for wildlife.

=== Climate ===
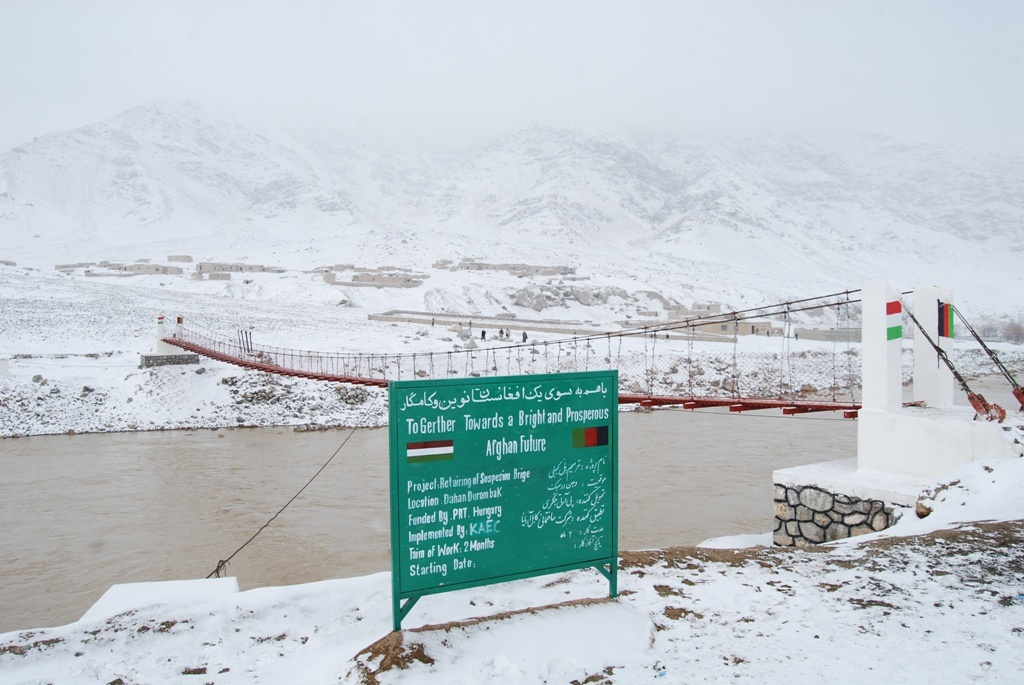
A snow-covered pedestrian bridge in Dushi, Baghlan (2010)

Baghlan has a continental highland climate with cold winters and warm summers. Higher mountainous regions experience long, harsh winters, with temperatures frequently falling below −10 °C and often reaching −20 °C or lower and heavy snowfall, while valleys have shorter, milder winters. Summer temperatures generally range from 20 to 30 °C in lower areas, and 10 to 20 °C at higher elevations. Precipitation varies widely with altitude, with snow dominating at higher elevations. Seasonal isolation is common in mountainous areas, as snow, landslides, and swollen rivers can cut off villages for extended periods.

== Government and politics ==
=== Governance ===
Historically, Baghlan was governed locally by tribal structures and local community leaders, particularly in rural and mountainous areas. Local elders and tribal chiefs often played a key role in dispute resolution, resource management, and representation to regional rulers. During the Soviet–Afghan War and subsequent civil war in the 1990s, parts of the province were under the control of the Soviet-backed Ismaili Sayeds of Kayan, who maintained schools, hospitals, and administrative services. At the same time, Mujahideen factions like the Jamiat-i Islami and other Northern Alliance parties operated in other districts, contesting control and shaping local politics.

After 2001, local governance in Baghlan was aligned with the central Afghan government, with elected and appointed officials overseeing provincial administration, while local councils and tribal elders continued to play a role in mediating disputes and managing social affairs. Since 2021, the province has been under the control of the Taliban, who have replaced previous administrative structures with their centralized governance model. Traditional tribal leaders, as well as remnants of previous local power networks, still influence decision-making in rural areas, particularly in disputes, security coordination, and local resource management.

As of December 2025, the governor of Badakhshan is Mawlawi Abdul Rahman Haqqani.

=== Administrative divisions ===
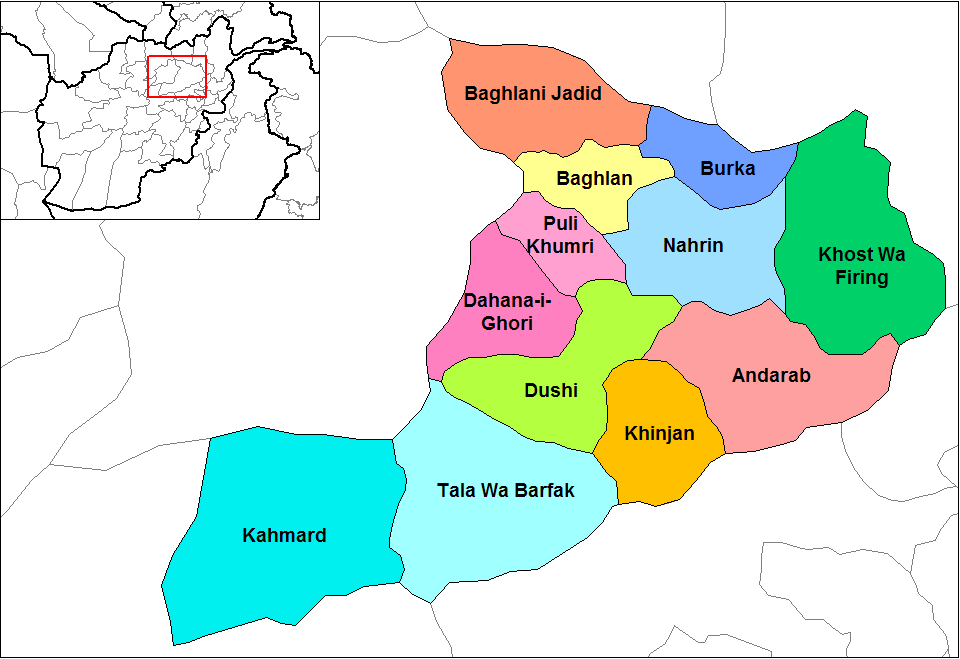
Map of the districts of Baghlan as of January 2004, prior to the redrawing of provincial and district boundaries later that year

Baghlan is divided into 15 districts, each governed by a district governor or local administrator appointed by the provincial authorities. The biggest cities are the provincial capital of Pul-e Khumri and Baghlan. These urban centers function as administrative, economic, and social hubs for their surrounding rural districts. The provincial and district divisions reflect both historical tribal boundaries and modern administrative planning.

Districts of Baghlan Province
District	Capital	Population	Area	Pop. density	Notes
Andarab		28,830	807	36	Tajik
Baghlani Jadid	Baghlan	198,382	1,676	118	Pashtun 70%, Tajik 20%, Uzbek 10%
Burka		59,521	933	64	60% Uzbek, 20% Tajik, 10% Hazara, 10% Pashtun
Dahana-I-Ghuri		66,618	1,333	50	80% Pashtun, 10% Hazara, 10% Uzbek
Dih Salah		36,137	633	57	Created in 2005 within Andarab District. Tajik dominated
Dushi		75,597	2,356	32	60% Hazara, 39% Tajik
Farang Wa Gharu		18,733	244	77	Tajik dominated, created in 2005 within Khost Wa Fereng District
Guzargahi Nur		11,426	425	27	Tajik dominated, created in 2005 within Khost Wa Fereng District
Khinjan		34,411	1,017	34	85% Tajik, 5% Hazara, 5% Pashtun, and 5% other
Khost Wa Fereng		71,345	1,898	38	Tajik dominated, sub-divided in 2005
Khwaja Hijran		26,971	659	41	Tajik dominated, created in 2005 within Andarab District
Nahrin		78,438	998	79	60% Tajik, 35% Pashtun 35%, 5% Uzbek
Puli Hisar		31,222	905	35	Tajik dominated, created in 2005 within Andarab District
Puli Khumri	Puli Khumri	242,859	664	366	Tajik 60%, Hazara 20%, Pashtun 13%, Uzbek 7%
Tala wa Barfak		34,144	2,525	14	Hazara 70%, Tajik 30%
Baghlan		1,014,634	18,255	56	52.8% Tajiks, 25.5% Pashtuns, 13.0% Hazaras, 8.2% Uzbeks, 0.2% others. (Note: "Predominantely" is interpreted as 99%, "majority" as 70%, "mixed" as 1/(number of ethnicities) and "minority" as 30%.)

=== Security ===
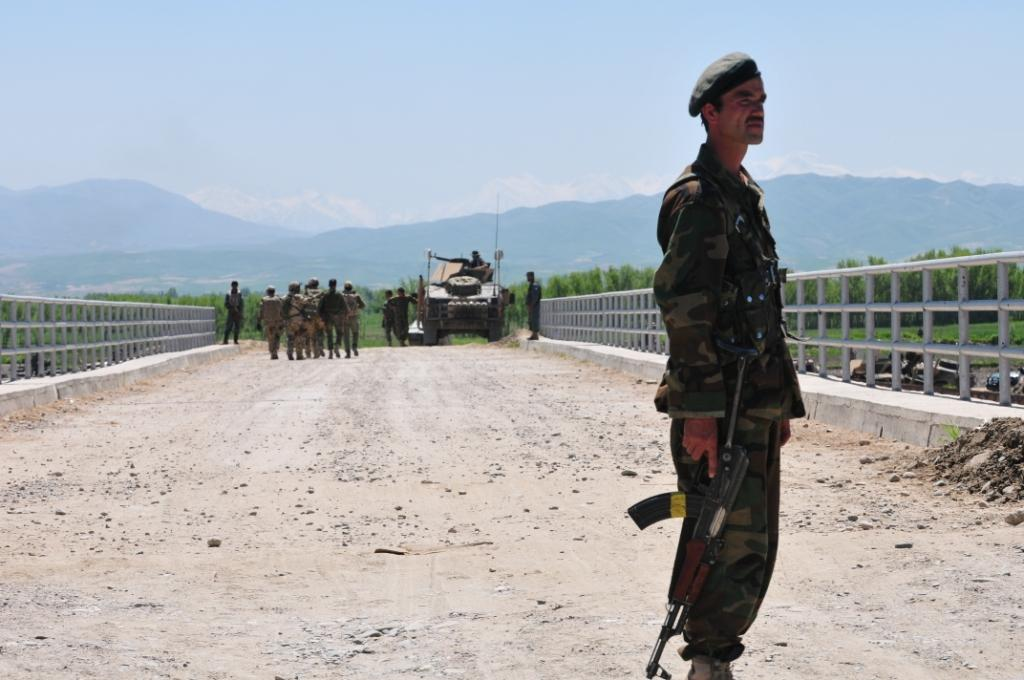
A soldier of the now defunct Afghan National Security Force stands guard on a bridge in Baghlan (2010)

Since 2021, Baghlan has been under the control of the Taliban following their nationwide takeover of Afghanistan. The group now oversees law enforcement, local administration, and dispute resolution across the province. Traditional tribal leaders and local elders continue to play a role in mediating conflicts, particularly in remote or rural districts. While major urban centers such as Pul-e Khumri are relatively stable under the administration of the Islamic Emirate, some mountainous and isolated districts remain sometimes tense due to occasional clashes with local resistance groups or rival armed factions. The province's rugged terrain continues to pose challenges for maintaining consistent security throughout Baghlan.

== Economy ==
The economy of Baghlan is largely based on agriculture, livestock farming, and regional trade, which together form the primary sources of income for most households. The rural population depends heavily on farming and animal husbandry for both subsistence and market production, while urban centers provide employment in administration, services, small industries, and commerce. Limited industrial development and ongoing political instability continue to restrict large-scale private investment and diversified economic growth.

=== Agriculture and animal husbandry ===
Agriculture constitutes the economic foundation of Baghlan. The fertile river valleys and plains support the cultivation of wheat, rice, maize, and sugar beets, which are grown for both local consumption and regional markets. Cotton and silk production play an important role in several districts, continuing long-established traditions of fiber production and small-scale textile-related activities. Fruit orchards producing grapes, pistachios, and pomegranates are widespread in irrigated areas and foothill zones. Irrigation is essential for agricultural production and is maintained through a system of canals and river diversions, many of which have existed for generations. Livestock farming forms a critical complement to crop cultivation. Rural communities raise Karakul sheep, goats, cattle, and poultry, providing meat, dairy products, wool, and working animals. In higher-altitude and mountainous districts, seasonal pastoralism and transhumance remain common, with herders moving livestock between summer and winter grazing areas. Animal husbandry also serves as an important buffer against crop failure and economic shocks.

=== Mining and raw materials ===
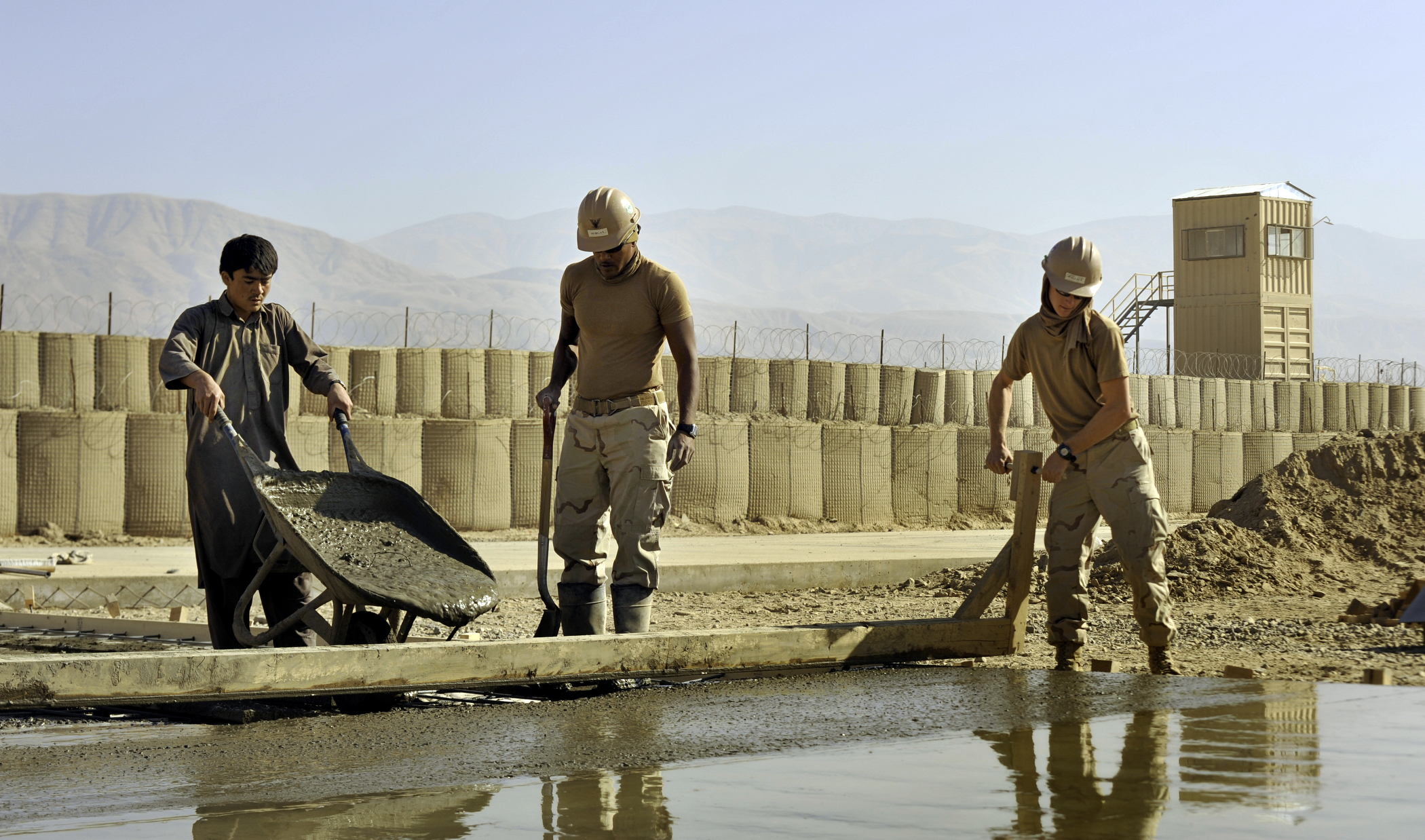
Afghan men working on a construction site in Baghlan (2010)

Baghlan possesses notable deposits of dolomite, celestite, clay, gypsum, and limestone, making mining one of the province's historically important economic sectors. Coal mining, particularly in the Karkar and Dudkash mines, played a significant role in the domestic energy supply of Afghanistan during the 20th century and continues on a reduced scale today. Salt extraction and quarrying of stone and gravel support local construction and regional markets. However, limited infrastructure, outdated equipment, and political uncertainty have constrained the expansion of the mining sector.

=== Trade ===
The trade infrastructure is closely linked to agricultural output, livestock markets, and transit trade. Urban centers such as Pul-e Khumri, Baghlan, Nahrin, and Dahana-e-Ghuri, function as the main commercial hubs, where agricultural produce, textiles, coal, and imported consumer goods are exchanged. Baghlan's location along major north–south transport routes connecting Kabul with Kunduz, Samangan, and Balkh gives it a strategic position in domestic trade networks. Weekly village markets and seasonal bazaars remain central to rural economic life, facilitating the exchange of food, livestock, tools, and household goods.

=== Energy and irrigation ===
The energy supply is based on a combination of hydropower, fossil fuels, and traditional energy sources. Small and medium hydroelectric facilities supply electricity to major towns, while rural areas depend heavily on firewood, coal, and diesel generators. Electricity shortages and seasonal water fluctuations continue to affect both household life and economic production. Irrigation is vital for agriculture and relies on river systems, canals, and traditional water management techniques. While these systems enable intensive cultivation in valleys and plains, aging infrastructure and limited maintenance pose long-term risks to water security.

=== Tourism ===
Baghlan features archaeological sites, historical ruins, religious shrines, and traditional settlements, alongside natural landscapes of river valleys and foothills. Domestic tourism occurs on a limited scale, particularly to pilgrimage sites. However, insecurity, limited transport infrastructure, and the lack of hospitality services have so far prevented the growth of any considerable tourism industry.

=== Communication ===
Communication infrastructure has expanded significantly since the early 2000s. Mobile phone coverage and internet services are available in major towns and many district centers, facilitating commerce, education, and administration. Nevertheless, remote mountainous districts continue to experience weak or unreliable connectivity, limiting access to information, financial services, and markets.

=== Transport and infrastructure ===
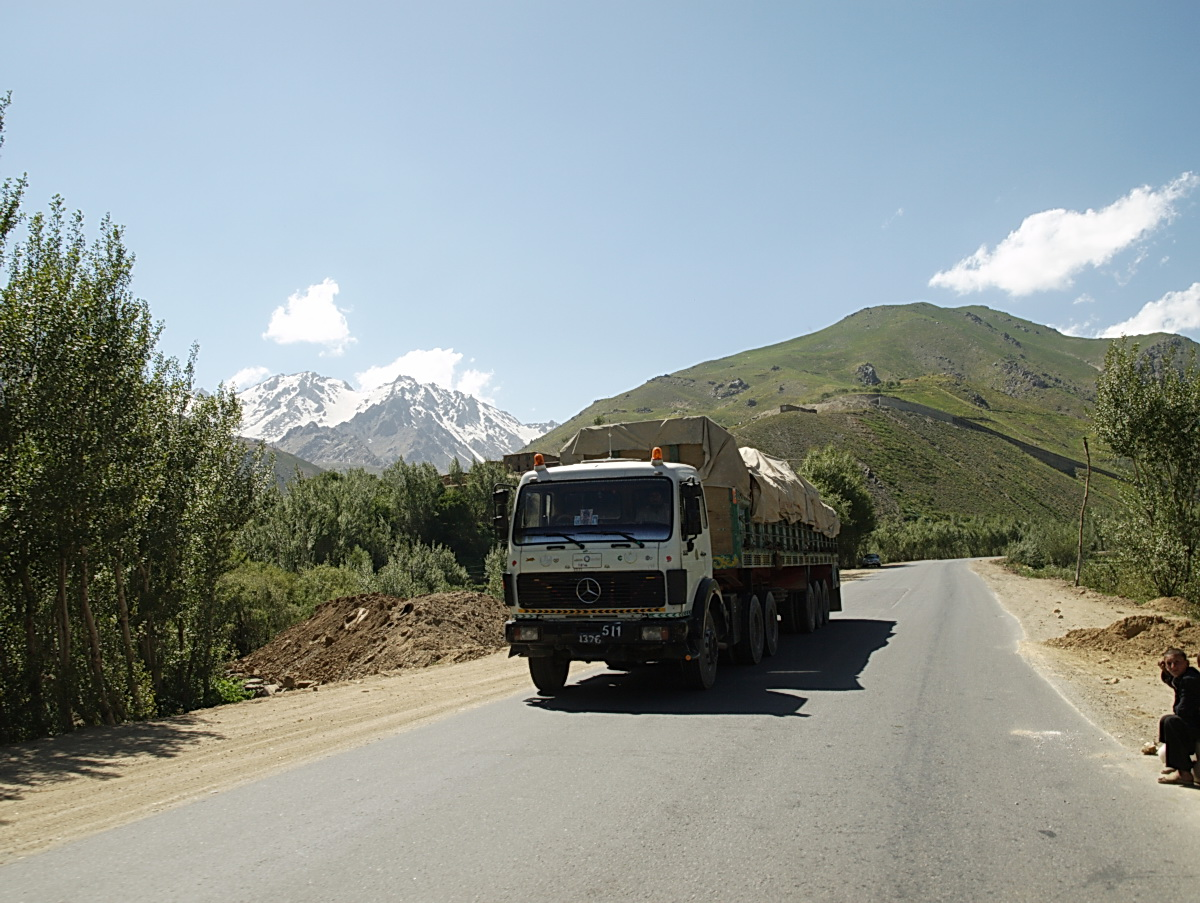
A truck on one of the few paved roads in Baghlan (2009)

Baghlan's transport network is structured around the national highway system, particularly the Kabul–Mazar-i-Sharif route passing through Pul-e Khumri. This corridor is essential for the movement of goods, fuel, food supplies, and passengers between northern and central Afghanistan. Outside the main highways, most districts depend on unpaved roads, gravel tracks, and mountain passes, which are often disrupted by snow, flooding, and landslides. Baghlan has no railway network, and freight as well as passenger transport relies entirely on road traffic. Air transport is also extremely limited, with only one small airfield, Baghlan Farm Airfield, used for light aircraft and occasional government or humanitarian flights. Bridges, local road networks, and transport facilities remain unevenly developed. Decades of conflict, limited funding, and difficult terrain have left much of the province's infrastructure in a fragile state, directly affecting economic productivity and market access.

== Demographics ==
=== Population ===
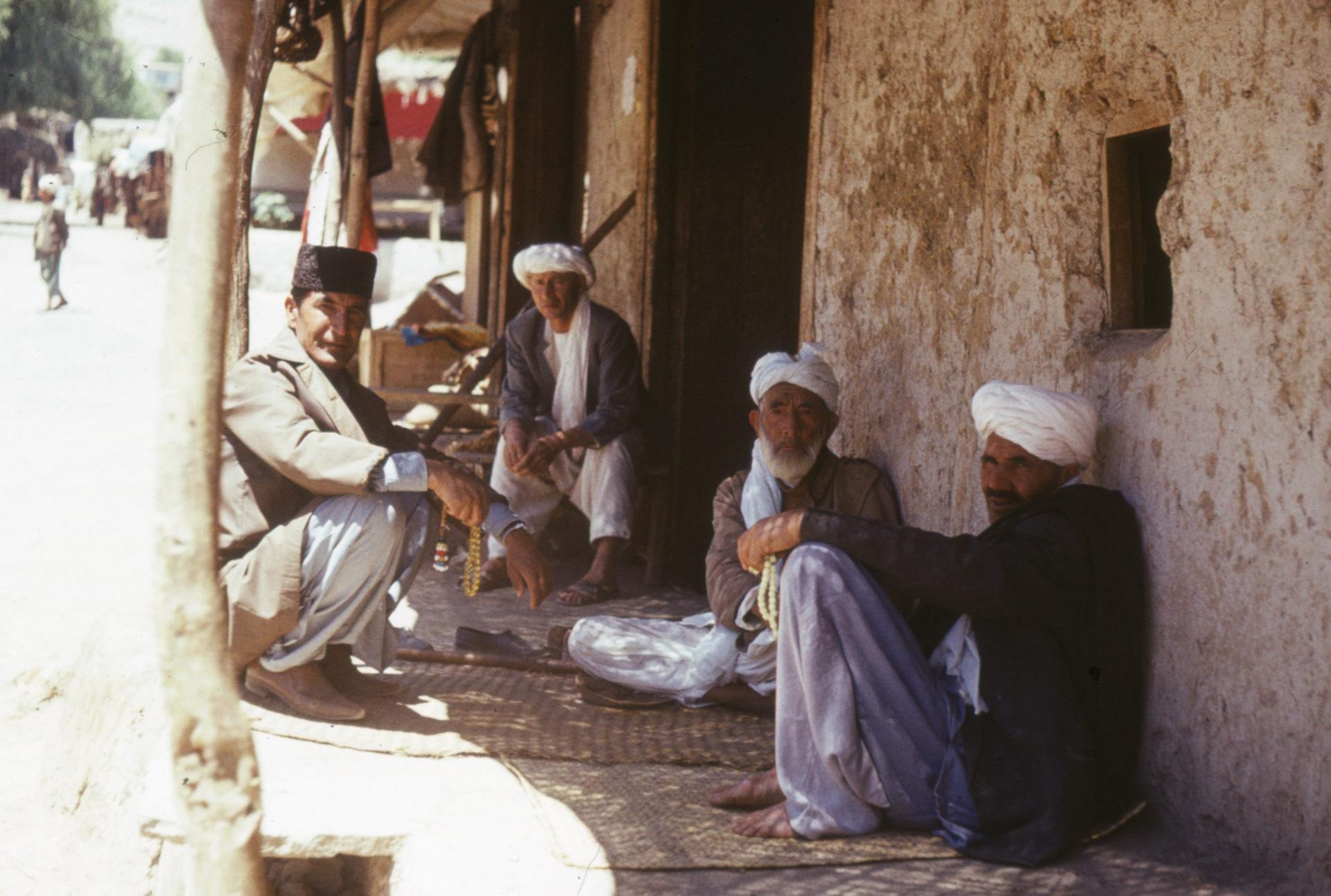
Baghlani men sitting in front of a traditional chaikhana (1976)

Baghlan has an estimated population of approximately 1.1 million people as of 2023, distributed across urban centers, small towns, and numerous rural villages. A minority of the population lives in urban areas, primarily in Pul-e Khumri, the provincial capital, and other towns such as Baghlan, Nahrin, and Dahana-e-Ghuri, while the majority resides in rural settlements throughout the river valleys and plains of the province.

Poverty remains widespread, particularly in mountainous and remote districts, with a multidimensional poverty index of 0.299, and 25.3% of the population living in severe poverty as of 2023. Limited access to infrastructure, healthcare, education, and stable employment contributes to high vulnerability. Seasonal disruptions caused by snowfall, flooding, and landslides regularly isolate villages and further strain living conditions. Internal displacement linked to past conflicts and economic migration to other Afghan provinces has also shaped recent demographic trends.

=== Ethnicity, languages, and religion ===
As in much of Afghanistan, ethnic and religious boundaries are often fluid and overlapping, shaped by intermarriage and shared local identities. Baghlan is characterized by a diverse ethnic composition, shaped by centuries of migration, trade, and regional interaction. The largest groups include Tajiks and Pashtuns with significant populations of Hazaras and Uzbeks, alongside smaller communities of Tatars and other minorities. Tajik communities are widespread across the province, while Pashtun and Uzbek populations are more prominent in the northern and lowland districts. Hazara communities are mainly concentrated in certain central and mountainous areas.

Dari and Pashto are the principal languages spoken and serve as the main languages of daily communication, administration, and education. Uzbek and Turkmen are used in specific districts, while multilingualism is common, with many residents speaking two or more languages. The population is predominantly Muslim. The majority adheres to Sunni Islam, while a significant minority follows Ismaili Shia Islam, particularly in districts historically associated with the Sayeds of Kayan. Religious identity continues to play an important role in social organization, local leadership, and community life.

Estimated ethnolinguistic and -religious composition
Ethnicity	Tajik/ Farsiwan	Hazara/ Ismaili	Pashtun	Uzbek	Tatar	Sources
Period	Tajik/ Farsiwan	Hazara/ Ismaili	Pashtun	Uzbek	Tatar	Sources

2004–2021 (Islamic Republic)	50 – 59%	2 – 15%	20 – 41%	3 – 12%	1 – 3%
2020 EU	1st	3rd	2nd	–	–
2019 AA	52%	2%	41%	3%	–
2018 UN	59%	14 – 15%	20%	5 – 6%	–
2015 NPS	52%	15%	20%	12%	1%
2015 CP	70%		22%	∅	–
2011 PRT	70%		22% (Note: excl. Kochi.)	–	–
2011 USA	50%	15%	20%	12%	3%

Legend:
- ∅: Ethnicity mentioned in source but not quantified
- –: Ethnicity not mentioned specifically
- Source abbreviations: Empirical sources: AA – Federal Foreign Office of Germany, Government sources: CP – Colombo Plan, EU – European Union Agency for Asylum, PRT – Provincial Reconstruction Team of the United States government, UN – United Nations Assistance Mission in Afghanistan, Editorial sources: NPS – Naval Postgraduate School, USA – United States Army.

=== Education ===
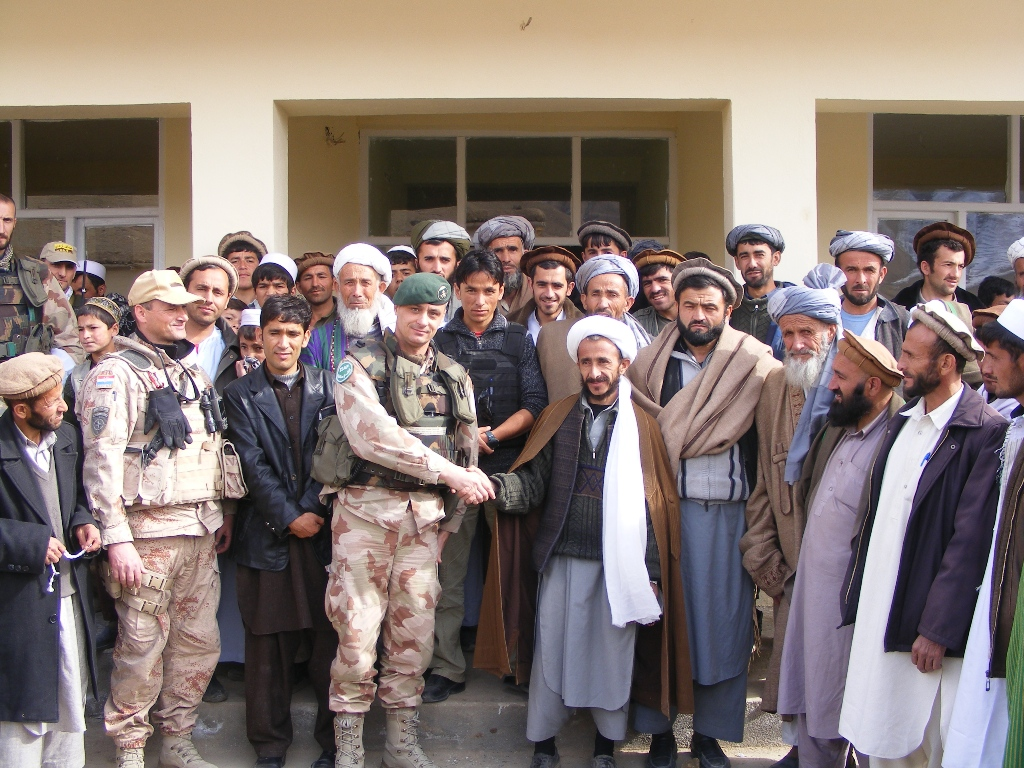
Baghlani officials at the opening of a new school in Jelga, Baghlan (2010)

Educational infrastructure in Baghlan is unevenly developed. Primary and secondary schools operate in most district centers, providing basic education for children, though attendance is frequently affected by economic pressures and past insecurity. Access to education is generally better in urban areas than in remote rural districts. Pul-e Khumri hosts the main higher education and vocational institutions, including Baghlan University, teacher training facilities and technical schools that serve students from across the province.

Since 2021, the education system has undergone structural changes under the Taliban administration. Madrasas have expanded in both urban and rural areas, often providing religious instruction alongside basic literacy and vocational training. Female access to secondary and higher education has been sharply restricted, significantly altering enrollment patterns. Literacy levels remain low, particularly among women, with the most recent available estimates from 2011 indicating an overall literacy rate of around 24% and an overall net enrolment rate for school-age children of approximately 62%, reflecting long-standing structural challenges in the education sector.

=== Health ===
Healthcare infrastructure is limited and concentrated in major urban centers. The main provincial hospital is the Pul-i-Khumri Civil Hospital and serves as the primary referral facility, offering general medical services and limited specialized care. District hospitals, clinics, and basic health units operate in other major towns and district centers, providing services such as maternal and child healthcare, vaccinations, and treatment of common illnesses. Many rural villages lack permanent medical facilities and rely on mobile health teams, local health posts, non-governmental organizations, or traditional healers. Public health challenges include high maternal and infant mortality, malnutrition, and limited access to clean drinking water and sanitation, with the most recent available estimates from 2011 indicating that 25% of households had access to clean drinking water and 22% of births were attended by a skilled birth attendant. International humanitarian organizations continue to play a crucial role in supporting healthcare delivery. However, weak infrastructure and security constraints often hinder consistent access to medical services, particularly in mountainous and remote districts.

== Culture ==
=== Music and dances ===
Traditional music in Baghlan reflects the broader cultural patterns of northern Afghanistan, shaped mainly by Tajik, Uzbek, Pashtun, and Hazara influences. Music is commonly performed at weddings, seasonal festivals, and family celebrations. Instruments such as the rubab, dambura, tabla, and harmonium are frequently used. Folk dances are typically performed in group formations, with men and women usually dancing separately in conservative rural environments. The most common forms include regional circle dances and rhythm-based step dances that accompany live or recorded traditional music.

=== Dresses and attire ===
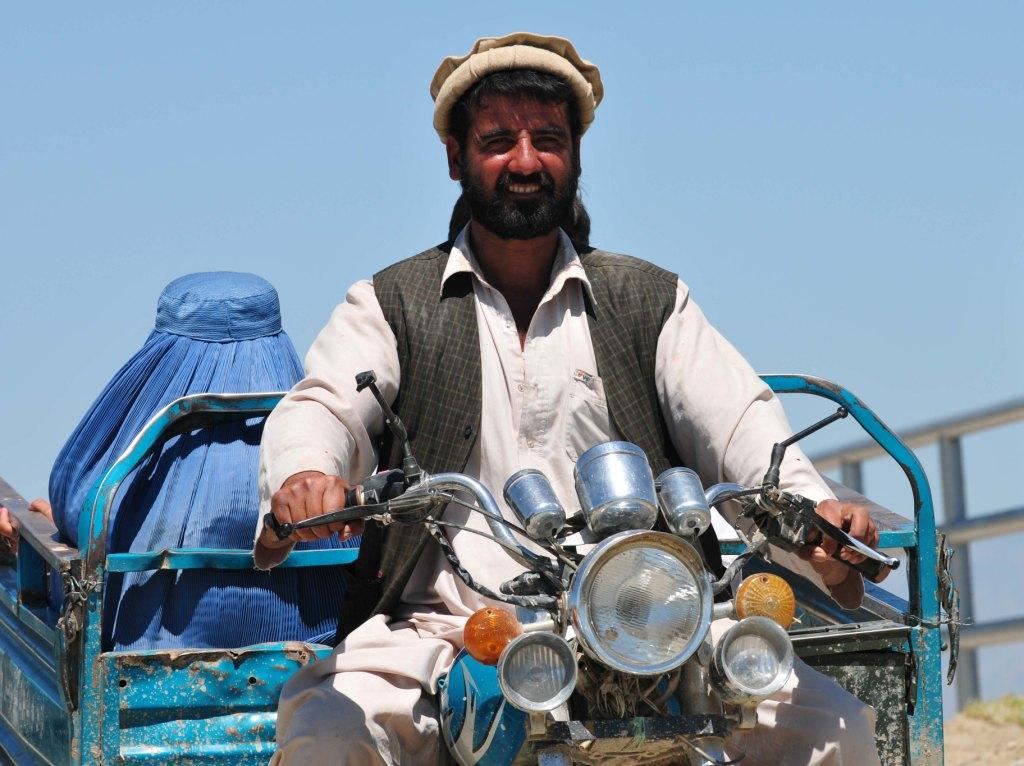
Baghlani man and woman in typical attire (2010)

Traditionally, clothing varies by ethnic background, gender, and rural–urban divide. Men commonly wear perahan o tunban with waistcoats, turbans, or pakol hats, especially in rural districts. Women traditionally wear long dresses with headscarves, often decorated with regional embroidery, particularly among Uzbek and Tajik communities. In urban areas such as Pul-e Khumri, western clothing styles are increasingly common, although traditional attire remains dominant during religious events and family ceremonies.

=== Cuisine ===
The cuisine of Baghlan is based on grain production, livestock products, and locally grown fruits. Staple foods include naan, rice, beans, dairy products, and vegetables. Popular dishes reflect the broader Afghan cuisine, including qabeli palaw, ashak, mantu, qorma, yogurt-based meals, and kebabs. Baghlan is especially known nationwide for its sugar production, which strongly influences local food industries and trade. Seasonal fruits such as grapes, mulberries, apricots, and melons are widely consumed.

=== Architecture, art, and literature ===
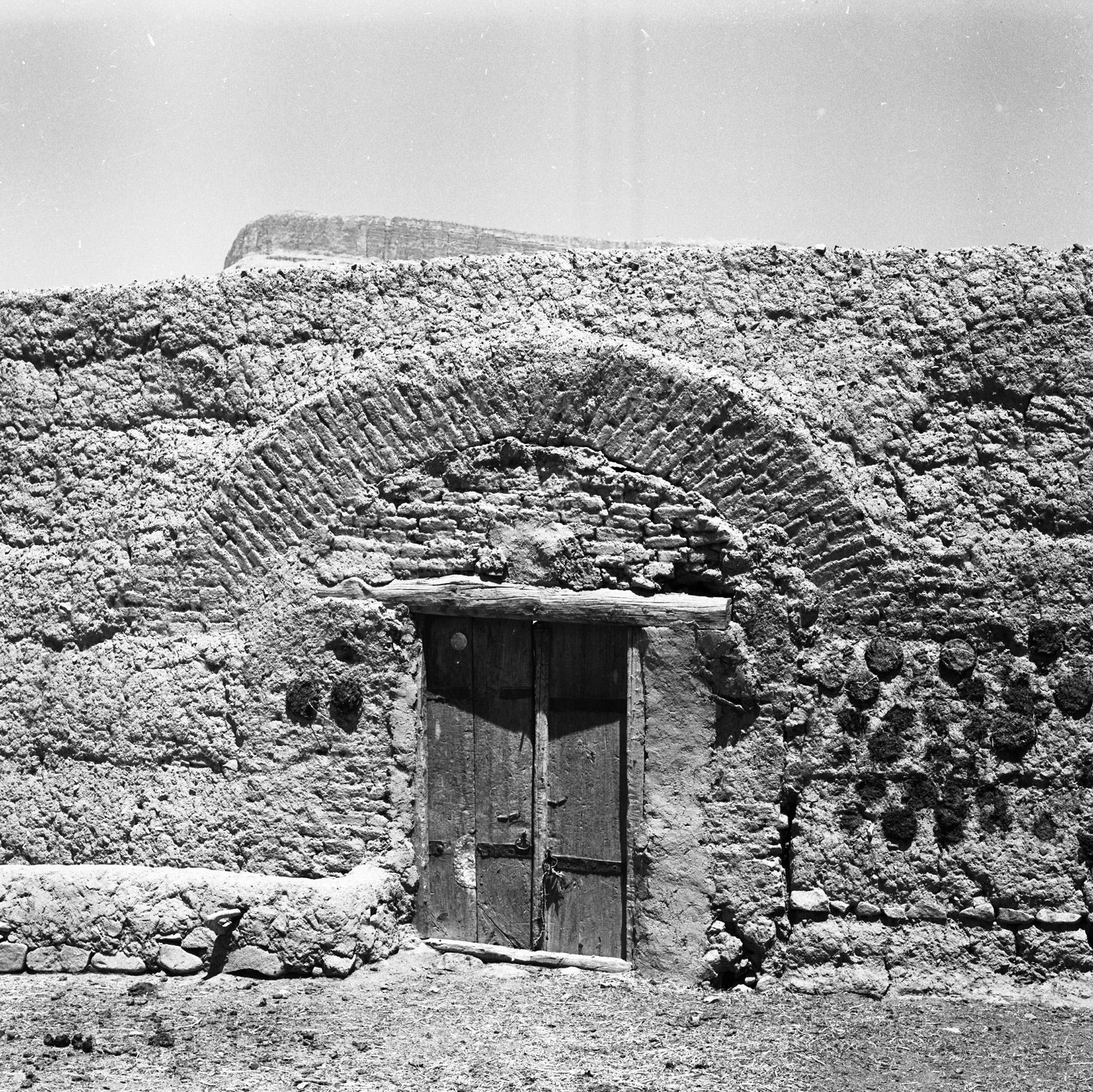
Entry gate to a winter enclosure in traditional architecture (1976)

The traditional architecture is shaped by climate and available materials, with mudbrick, stone, and timber houses dominating rural areas. Flat roofs and thick walls provide insulation against heat and cold. In mountainous districts, settlements are compact and built on steep terrain. Urban centers show a blend of traditional Afghan design, Soviet-era structures, and post-2001 concrete construction. Mosques and shrines serve as key architectural and social landmarks. Artistic expression is largely connected to handicrafts, including carpet weaving, embroidery, pottery, metalwork, and woodworking. These crafts follow long-standing regional traditions. Literary culture is rooted in Dari and Pashto poetry and oral storytelling, with strong connections to the wider Persian literary tradition. Religious poetry and epic narration remain important in rural communities.

=== Media, entertainment, and festivities ===
Local access to media is mainly through radio, mobile networks, and limited television broadcasting. National Afghan TV and radio stations are received in most urban areas. Public entertainment is mostly centered on weddings, religious holidays, and seasonal agricultural celebrations. Major religious festivals such as Eid al-Fitr and Eid al-Adha are widely celebrated through prayer gatherings, family visits, and communal meals. Since 2021, public entertainment has become more restricted, particularly regarding music performances and mixed-gender events.

=== Places of interest ===
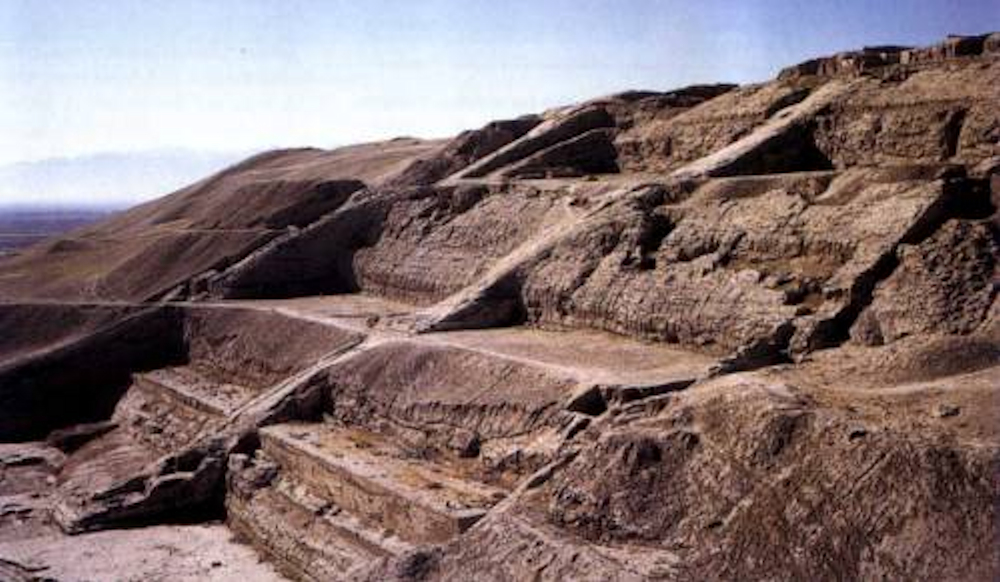
Ruins of the staircases to the fire temple of the Surkh Kotal archaeological site

Baghlan is home to several important historical and archaeological landmarks. The most significant site is Surkh Kotal, a major Kushan-era archaeological complex, known for its monumental ruins and inscriptions. It represents one of the most important remnants of pre-Islamic imperial architecture in Afghanistan. Other notable sites include ancient fortresses, historical bridges, and religious shrines across districts such as Dushi, Baghlan, and Nahrin. In addition to historical sites, river valleys and mountain landscapes are valued locally for their scenic importance, though tourism remains underdeveloped due to security and infrastructure limitations.

=== Sports ===
Sport plays an important role in everyday life, especially among young people. Traditional sports such as buzkashi are regularly played during major festivals and regional tournaments. Among modern sports, football and cricket are the most popular organized sports, followed by volleyball, wrestling, and athletics. Informal football fields are common in towns and villages. During the period of the Islamic Republic, Baghlan was represented in national football competitions through Mawjhai Amu FC, which served as the regional team for Baghlan together with Kunduz, Takhar, and Badakhshan in the Afghan Premier League. In national cricket competitions such as the Shpageeza Cricket League, Baghlan is represented as part of the Pamir Zalmi franchise, which covers the northeastern provinces.

== Notable people ==
=== Historical figures ===
- Qutayba ibn Sa'id (~767-854), major Hadith scholar born in Baghlan, who travelled the Muslim world then returning to Baghlan before his death, quoted extensively in Sahih al-Bukhari and the Kutub al-Sittah.
- Mir Mirak Andrabi, 16th-century Sufi scholar with roots in Baghlan
- Sali Noyan, 13th-century Mongol commander stationed in the Kunduz-Baghlan area under Mongol rule, whose forces formed part of the Qara'unas and remained influential through the Timurid period

=== Modern figures ===
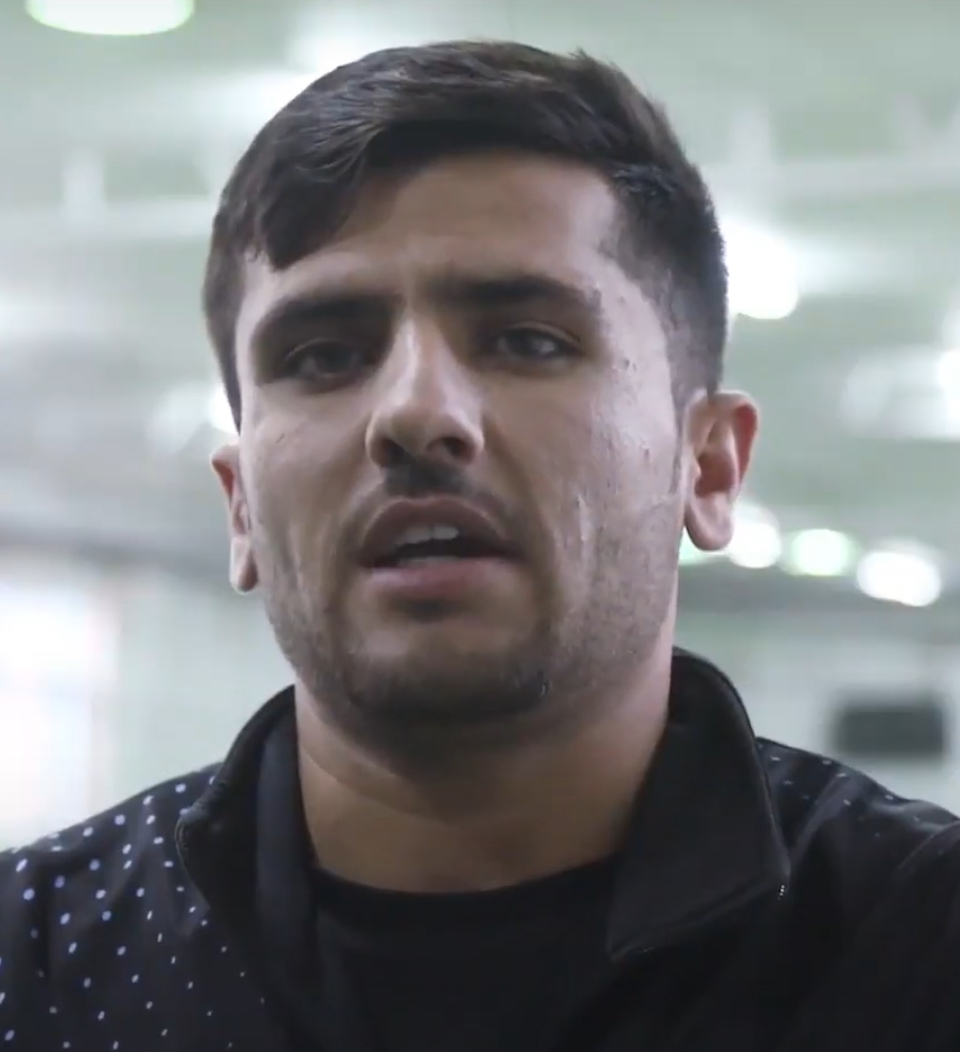
Fazalhaq Farooqi, cricketer with almost 100 appearances for the national team

- Dilawar Ahmadzay, national football player
- Mohammad Asim Asim, politician and former governor
- Bibi Ayesha, former military leader, the only known female warlord in Afghanistan
- Mohammad Akbar Barakzai, politician and former governor
- Khaliq Dad, national cricket player
- Fazalhaq Farooqi, national cricket player
- Nangialai Kharoti, national cricket player
- Munshi Abdul Majid, politician and former governor
- Yaqub Yasna, Writer, poet, literary schola
- Abdul Malik, national cricket player
- Waheed Muzhda, political analyst and writer
- Muhammad Hisham at-Tahiri, Islamic cleric in Kuwait and descendant of the Tahirid dynasty.
