= Kunduz River =

River in Afghanistan

Coordinates: 37°00′15″N 68°15′54″E

The Kunduz River (Persian: رود قندوز) is a tributary of the Amu Darya in northern Afghanistan. It rises in Bamyan Province in the Hindu Kush, and in its upper reaches is also known as the Bamyan River or the Surkhab River. After passing through Baghlan and Kunduz provinces, the Kunduz River merges into the Amu Darya.

== Course ==
The Kunduz rises in the glacier region on the north side of the Koh-i-Baba range in Bamyan Province, some 20 km southwest of the town of Bamyan, where the river is known as the Bamyan River. It flows east in a deep valley separating the western part of the Hindu Kush on the north from the Koh-i-Baba on the south. After about 50 km, it sharply bends north, crossing the Hindu Kush range. It then turns northeast and enters Baghlan Province. There the river is known as the Surkhab.

It then parallels a northern spur of the Hindu Kush for more than 80 km, receiving many small tributaries on its right bank.

At the town of Doshi it receives the Andarab, a large tributary flowing from the east. After passing through the cities of Puli Khumri and Baghlan, it enters Kunduz Province. At Yakala-ye Zad, 30 km past the city of Kunduz, the river meets its largest tributary, the Khanabad River, shortly before discharging into the Amu Darya.

== Basin ==
The basin of the Kunduz River covers almost the entire Baghlan Province, the eastern part of Bamyan Province and two-thirds of Takhar and Kunduz Provinces. Its area is estimated at 31,300 square kilometers.

== Flow rates ==
Flow rates of the river were observed for 15 years (1950-1965) at Puli Khumri, where the river reaches the Amu Darya plain. At Puli Khumri, the annual mean flow was 67.6 m³ per second, from a basin of 17,250 square kilometres.
