= Baghlan =

City in northern Afghanistan

Baghlan بغلان
- Location in Afghanistan
- Coordinates: 36°7′58″N 68°42′0″E
- Country: Afghanistan
- Province: Baghlan
- District: Baghlan

Government
  - Type: Municipality
  - Mayor: Qari Lutfullah Ubaidah
- Elevation: 1,732 ft (528 m)

Population (2025)
  - City: 219,073
  - Urban: 89,625
  - Rural: 129,448
- Time zone: UTC+04:30 (Afghanistan Time)
- Postal code: 36XX
- ISO 3166 code: AF-BGL

Baghlan (Note: Pashto: بغلان, romanized: Bağlān [baɣ.lɑn]; Dari: بغلان, romanized: Bağlān [bäɣ.lɑ́ːn]) , also known as Markazi Baghlan or Baghlan-i-Markazi, is a city in northern Afghanistan, in the eponymous Baghlan Province. It is within the jurisdiction of Baghlan District and has an estimated population of 219,073 people. The current mayor of the city is Qari Lutfullah Ubaidah.

Baghlan is located 4.8 km (3.0 mi) east of the Kunduz River and 56 km (35 mi) south of the Khanabad River. The city is about 500 m (1,600 ft) above sea level in the northern Hindu Kush mountains. The city of Puli Khumri is known to be an economic hub connected to eight other provinces by the Afghanistan Ring Road, also known as National Highway 01.

== History ==
Baghlan grew as an urban center in the 1930s as a result of a new road from Kabul across the Kunduz River.

Baghlan was the capital of the defunct Qataghan Province of northeastern Afghanistan, prior to the controversial 1964 dissolution.

The capital of Baghlan province was officially transferred to the city of Puli Khumri from the central city of Baghlan. This transition occurred during the 1980s under the influence of Sayed Mansur Naderi, son of Sayed Kayan, who held significant military and political power at the time. The relocation aimed to enhance public access to administrative offices, leveraging Puli Khumri's strategic location along the Kabul-Mazar highway. The cabinet of Mohammad Najibullah, led by Sultan Ali Keshtmand, initially proposed this move through declaration number 492 on March 1, 1989. It was subsequently formalized by Najibullah through decree number 1603 on March 9, 1989.

On 6 November 2007, a suicide bombing targeted a sugar factory in Baghlan during a visit by members of the National Assembly of Afghanistan. Up to 100 people have been reported killed, including six legislators. One of the victims that was killed was Hajji Muhmmad Arif Zarif an MP from the Kabul province.

== Climate ==
With an influence from the local steppe climate, Baghlan features a cold semi-arid climate (BSk) under the Köppen climate classification. The average temperature in Baghlan is 15.8 °C (60.4 °F), while the annual precipitation averages 284 mm (11.2 in).

July is the hottest month of the year with an average temperature of 28.3 °C (82.9 °F). The coldest month January has an average temperature of 3.0 °C (37.4 °F).

Climate data for Baghlan, elevation 510 m (1,670 ft)
| Month | Jan | Feb | Mar | Apr | May | Jun | Jul | Aug | Sep | Oct | Nov | Dec | Year |
|---|---|---|---|---|---|---|---|---|---|---|---|---|---|
| Mean daily maximum °C (°F) | 7.1 (44.8) | 8.8 (47.8) | 15.8 (60.4) | 22.2 (72.0) | 29.2 (84.6) | 35.7 (96.3) | 37.2 (99.0) | 36.0 (96.8) | 31.6 (88.9) | 24.2 (75.6) | 16.1 (61.0) | 9.6 (49.3) | 22.8 (73.0) |
| Daily mean °C (°F) | 1.3 (34.3) | 3.7 (38.7) | 10.3 (50.5) | 15.8 (60.4) | 21.0 (69.8) | 26.1 (79.0) | 27.3 (81.1) | 25.1 (77.2) | 20.0 (68.0) | 14.6 (58.3) | 7.5 (45.5) | 3.0 (37.4) | 14.6 (58.4) |
| Mean daily minimum °C (°F) | −2.8 (27.0) | 0.0 (32.0) | 5.0 (41.0) | 10.1 (50.2) | 13.5 (56.3) | 16.3 (61.3) | 18.2 (64.8) | 16.0 (60.8) | 11.6 (52.9) | 6.8 (44.2) | 2.0 (35.6) | −1.4 (29.5) | 7.9 (46.3) |
| Average precipitation mm (inches) | 34.7 (1.37) | 46.9 (1.85) | 66.6 (2.62) | 64.6 (2.54) | 32.2 (1.27) | 0.0 (0.0) | 0.5 (0.02) | 0.1 (0.00) | 0.1 (0.00) | 11.3 (0.44) | 20.7 (0.81) | 28.8 (1.13) | 306.5 (12.05) |
Source: FAO

== Demographics ==
The city of Baghlan has an estimated population of 219,073 people, while the whole province has an estimated population of 1,113,400 people. They include Pashtuns, Tajiks, Hazaras and Uzbeks.

The population was estimated at 20,000 in 1960 and about 24,410 in 1963, an increase of 22.05% over three years. In 1965 the estimate was 92,432, an increase of 278.66% in two years.

== Economy ==
Baghlan is the center of sugar beet production in Afghanistan. Cotton production and cotton manufacturing are also important in the region.

== Notable people ==
- Qutayba ibn Sa'id
- Sayed Jafar Naderi
- Abdullah Khenjani
- Sayed Mansur Naderi
- Muhammad Hisham at-Tahiri

== See also ==
- List of cities in Afghanistan
