= Afzalids =

Political group in Afghanistan

- افضليان; افضلی ها
- Leaders: Mohammad Afzal Khan (1863–1866); Mohammad Azam Khan (1866–1867); Abdur Rahman Khan (1867–1880 in exile; 1880–1901)
- Founded: Afghan Civil War (1863–1869)
- Dates active: June 9, 1863 – October 1, 1901
- Dissolved: 1 October 1901
- Country: Emirate of Afghanistan
- Headquarters: Takhtapul (1863–1869); Samarkand (1869–1880); Kabul (1880–1901)
- Wars: Afghan Civil War (1863–1869); Second Anglo-Afghan War; Afghan Civil War (1880–1881); 1881 Herat uprising; Afghan conquest of Maimana; Ghilzai uprisings (1886–1887); Hazara uprisings; Revolt of Sardar Mohammad Ishaq Khan; 1892 Maimana revolt; Conquest of Kafiristan

The Afzalids, also known as the Afzalid dynasty, were a significant political group in Afghanistan primarily founded on the belief that Mohammad Afzal Khan was the successor of Dost Mohammad Khan after his death on 9 June 1863. It lasted until the death of the last Afzalid ruler Abdur Rahman Khan on 1 October 1901.

== Background ==
Mohammad Afzal Khan was the eldest son of Dost Mohammad Khan, but was not chosen as the heir-apparent during his father's reign, nor as the chosen successor during his father's death. Instead, his younger brother Sher Ali Khan succeeded him as Emir of Afghanistan, and the absence of primogeniture infuriated Afzal, who later declared war on Sher Ali with his son Abdur Rahman Khan and uterine brother Mohammad Azam Khan.

== Rise to power ==
The Afzalids rose to fame during the Afghan Civil War after Abdur Rahman Khan captured Kabul and Sheikhabad, which deposed Sher Ali Khan during his third year of rule, freeing Mohammad Afzal Khan from prison and installing him onto the throne.

== Exile ==
Mohammad Afzal Khan was succeeded by Mohammad Azam Khan after he succumbed to cholera on 7 October 1867. But towards the end of 1868, Sher Ali Khan's return and a general rising in his favor resulted in Abdur Rahman Khan and Mohammad Azam Khan's defeat at Tinah Khan on 3 January 1869. Both sought refuge to the east in Central Asia, where Abdur Rahman placed himself under Russian protection at Samarkand. Mohammad Azam Khan died in Persia in October 1869.

== Restored reign ==
After Sher Ali Khan's death, the Afzalids once again were able to consolidate their power in Afghanistan after their alliance with the British to overthrow the former rival regime in the Second Anglo-Afghan War, which granted the new government a de jure British protected state status with annual subsidy.

The last Afzalid ruler Abdur Rahman Khan died on 1 October 1901, and there were no longer any movements dedicated to enthroning Mohammad Afzal Khan.
