= Aqsaqal Faizullah Khan Qara-Bay =

19th-century Afghan governor

Aqsaqal Faizullah Khan Qara-Bay (Persian: آقسقال فیض‌الله خان قره‌بای; died c. 1881–1883) was a regional leader in nineteenth-century Badakhshan Province, located in northeastern Afghanistan. He held the title of Mir (governor or local ruler) of Faizabad during the period of the Second Anglo-Afghan War (1878–1880). His governance coincided with a transitional period in Afghan state formation, during which the central government under Abdur Rahman Khan sought to assert authority over autonomous regions.

== Background ==
Faizullah Khan was affiliated with the Qara-Bay clan, a group of Uzbek or Turkic descent based in Badakhshan. He held the title Aqsaqal—an honorific used for tribal elders or community leaders in Central Asian and Afghan contexts.

== Role in Badakhshan ==
During the late 19th century, Faizullah Khan governed parts of Badakhshan, including Faizabad. The region was politically significant due to its proximity to the Wakhan Corridor and its trade routes along the Kokcha River, linking Central Asia and China. His administration functioned largely autonomously from Kabul during the fragmented political landscape of the time.

== Second Anglo-Afghan War ==
Faizullah Khan held power during the Second Anglo-Afghan War, a conflict between the Emirate of Afghanistan and the British Empire from 1878 to 1880. He governed under the nominal authority of Sher Ali Khan and later Yaqub Khan, although Badakhshan itself was not a central battlefield. Historical accounts note that his administration remained stable throughout this period.

== Death and political shift ==
Following the rise of Abdur Rahman Khan in 1880, efforts to centralize power led to the removal of semi-autonomous regional leaders, including Faizullah Khan. According to several historical sources, Faizullah Khan was killed between 1881 and 1883, reportedly in Faizabad. His death is interpreted by historians as part of the broader political transformation aimed at state centralization.

== Legacy ==
Faizullah Khan is referenced in several scholarly works on nineteenth-century Afghanistan. His governance reflects the challenges of balancing tribal autonomy with emerging state centralization under Abdur Rahman Khan. He is often cited in studies of provincial governance and power dynamics during the late Barakzai period.

== See also ==
- Badakhshan Province
- Faizabad, Afghanistan
- Second Anglo-Afghan War
- Sher Ali Khan
- Abdur Rahman Khan

=== Further reading ===
- Bellew, H.W. (1879). Afghanistan and the Afghans. Sampson Low.
- Malleson, G.B. (1878). History of Afghanistan. W.H. Allen.
- Saikal, Amin (2004). Modern Afghanistan. I.B. Tauris. ISBN 978-1850434375.
- Elphinstone, Mountstuart (1815). An Account of the Kingdom of Caubul. Longman.
