= List of rulers of Kandahar =

List of Afghan Rulers in present-day Afghanistan with capital at Kandahar

Term	Incumbent	Notes
Shahs (Kings)
Saddozay Dynasty of Popalzay
July 1747 to 16 October 1772	Timur Shah	Shah at Kabul
16 October 1772 to 1772	Solayman Shah
1772 to 18 May 1793	Timur Shah	Shah at Kabul
18 May 1793 to 19 June 1793	Homayun Shah
19 June 1793 to 1801	Zaman Shah	Shah at Kabul
July 1803	Mahmud Shah	Shah at Kabul
1804	Shoja' al-Molk Shah	Shah at Kabul
1804 to 1805	Kamran Shah
1805 to 1808	Shoja' al-Molk Shah	Shah at Kabul
1808 to 1808	Mahmud Shah	1st Term
1808 to 1808	Qaysar Shah	Shah at Kabul
1809 to 3 May	1809 Mahmud Shah	2nd Term
3 May 1809 to 1818	Mahmud Shah	Shah at Kabul
1819 to 1826	Shirdil Khan Mohammadzay (regent)
1826 to 1839	Purdil Khan Mohammadzay (regent)
1829 to 1839	Kohan Dil Khan Mohammadzay (regent)	1st Term
April 1839 to 5 April 1842	Shoja' al-Molk Shah
May 1842 to 1842	Safdar Jang Khan Saddozay (regent)
1842 to August 1855	Kohan Dil Khan Mohammadzay (regent)	2nd Term
August 1855 to November 1855	Muhammad Sadiq Khan Mohammadzay (regent)
November 1855 to July 1858	Gholam Haydar Khan Mohammadzay (regent)
July 1858 to 9 June 1863	Dost Mohammad Khan	Shah at Kabul
Emirs
Mohammadzay Dynasty of Barakzay
1863 to 1865	Mohammad Amin Khan, Amir al-Mo’menin
1865 to January 1867	Shir 'Ali Khan, Amir al-Mo’menin	1st Term
January 1867 to 7 October 1867	Mohammad Afzal Khan, Amir al-Mo’menin
7 October 1867 to April 1868	Mohammad A'zam Khan, Amir al-Mo’menin
April 1868 to 8 September 1868	Shir 'Ali Khan, Amir al-Mo’menin	2nd Term
8 September 1868 to 21 February 1879	Shir 'Ali Khan, Amir al-Mo’menin	Shah at Kabul
12 October 1879	Mohammad Ya'qub Khan, Amir al-Mo’menin	Shah at Kabul
1880 to 21 April 1881	Shir 'Ali Khan Barakzay, Amir al-Mo’menin (minister-regent)
21 April 1881 to 20 July 1881	Abdor Rahman Khan, Amir al-Mo’menin	Shah at Kabul
20 July 1881 to 22 September 1881	Mohammad Ayyub Khan, Amir al-Mo’menin
