= Turkestan (disambiguation) =

Turkestan is a region in Central Asia historically populated by Turkic peoples.

Turkestan or Turkistan may also refer to:

- Turkistan Region, a province in Kazakhstan
  - Turkistan (city), its administrative capital
- Russian Turkestan, a region in Russia
- Chinese Turkestan or East Turkestan, a region in China
- Afghan Turkestan, a region in Afghanistan
- Turkestan Province, a former province in Afghanistan
- Turkestan Autonomous Soviet Socialist Republic, a former republic in the Soviet Union
- Turkestan Military District, a former district in Russian Central Asia
- Reichskommissariat Turkestan, a projected Reichskommissariat proposed by ideologist Alfred Rosenberg for Nazi Germany to create in the Central Asian Republics of the Soviet Union

== Former countries ==
- First East Turkestan Republic
- Second East Turkestan Republic
- Turkestan Autonomous Soviet Socialist Republic, in the Soviet Union
- Turkestan Autonomy
