= Afghan Turkestan =

Region in northern Afghanistan

- Region
- Turkic-inhabited areas (according to the CIA, 2005)
- Countries: Afghanistan
- Languages: Uzbek, Turkmen, Dari, Pashto

Area
  - Total: 147,000 km^{2} (57,000 sq mi)

Afghan Turkestan (Note: Dari: ترکستان افغان, romanized: Turkistāni Afghān) is a region in northern Afghanistan, on the border with the countries of Turkmenistan, Uzbekistan, and Tajikistan. In the 19th century, there was a province in Afghanistan named Turkestan with Mazar-e Sharif as provincial capital. The province incorporated the territories of the present-day provinces of Balkh, Kunduz, Jowzjan, Sar-e Pol, and Faryab. In 1890, Qataghan-Badakhshan Province was separated from Turkestan Province. It was later abolished by Emir Habibullah Khan.

The whole territory of Afghan Turkestan, from the junction of the Kokcha river with the Amu Darya on the north-east to the province of Herat on the south-west, was some 800 kilometres (500 mi) in length, with an average width from the Russian frontier to the Hindu Kush of 183 km (114 mi). It thus comprised about 147,000 km^{2} (57,000 sq mi) or roughly two-ninths of the former Kingdom of Afghanistan.

== Geography ==
The area is agriculturally poor except in the river valleys, being rough and mountainous towards the south, but subsiding into undulating wastes and pasture-lands towards the Karakum Desert.

The province included the khanates of Kunduz, Tashkurgan, Balkh, and Akcha in the east and the four khanates or Chahar Wilayat ("four domains") of Saripul, Shibarghan, Andkhoy (city), and Maymana in the west.

== Demographics ==
CIA map showing the territory of the settlement of ethnic groups and subgroups in Afghanistan

The bulk of the people are Uzbeks and Turkmens with large concentrations of Hazaras, Qizilbashs, Tatars, Tajiks, and Pashtuns.

== History ==
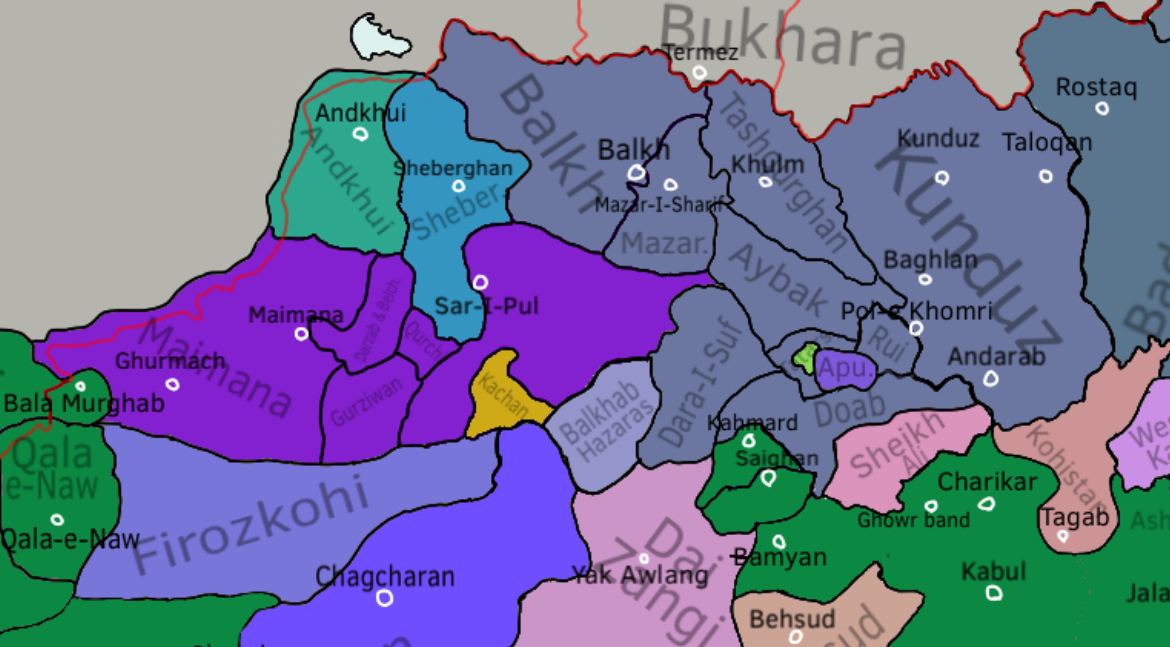
Map of Afghan Turkestan in January 1751

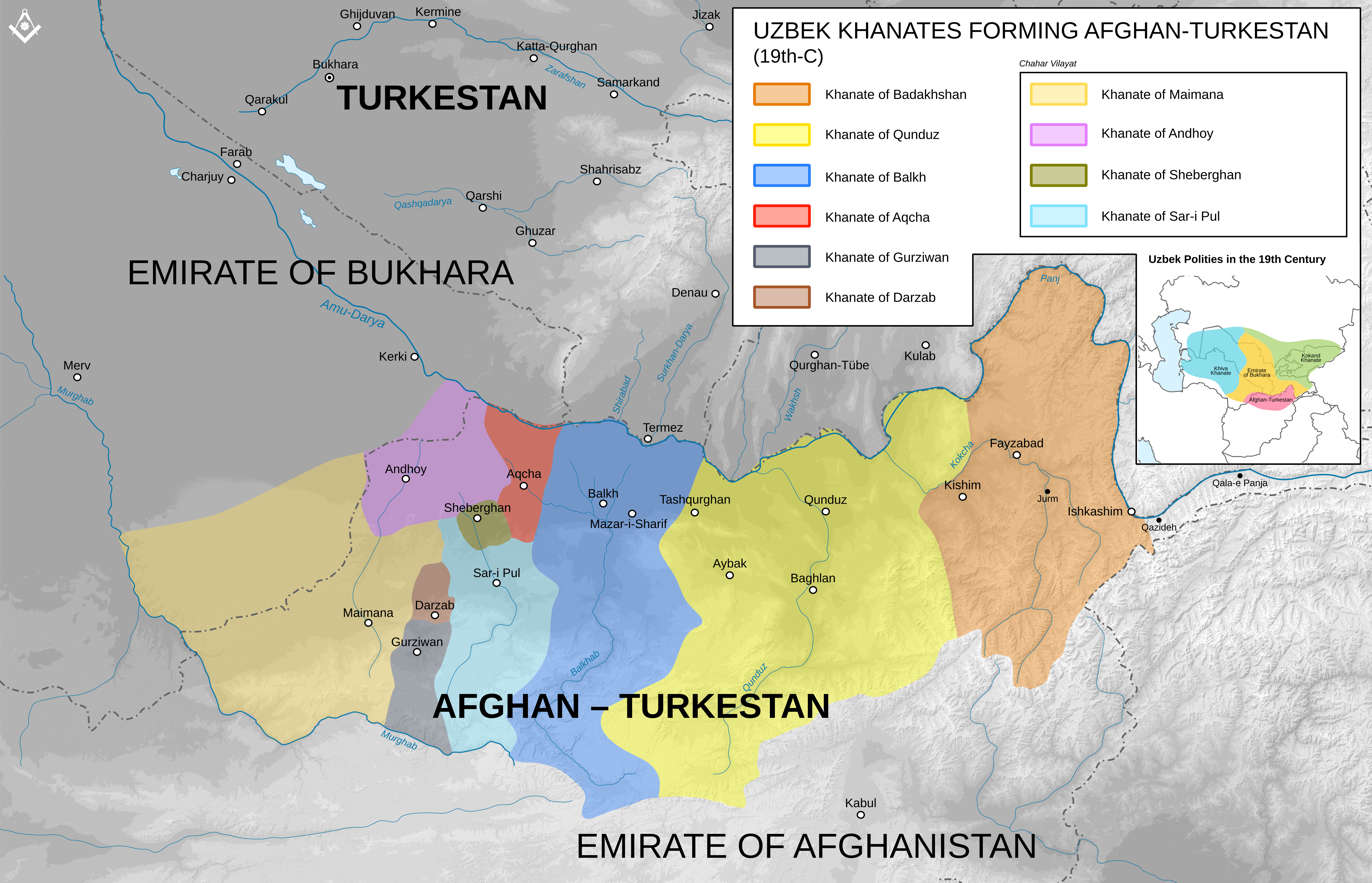
Map of Uzbek Khanates forming Afghan-Turkestan, 19th century

Ancient Balkh or Bactria was an integral part of Bactria–Margiana Archaeological Complex, and was occupied by Indo-Iranians. In the 5th century BCE, it became a province of the Achaemenian Empire and later became part of the Seleucid Empire. About 250 BC Diodotus (Theodotus), governor of Bactria under the Seleucidae, declared his independence, and commenced the history of the Greco-Bactrian dynasties, which succumbed to Parthian and nomadic movements about 126 BC. After this came a Buddhist era which has left its traces in the gigantic sculptures at Bamian and the rock-cut topes of Haibak. The district was devastated by Genghis Khan, and has never since fully recovered its prosperity. For about a century it belonged to the Delhi empire, and then fell into Uzbek hands. In the 18th century it formed part of the dominion of Ahmad Shah Durrani, and so remained under his son Timur Shah. But under the fratricidal wars of Timur's sons the separate khanates fell back under the independent rule of various Uzbek chiefs. At the beginning of the 19th century they belonged to Bukhara; but under the emir Dost Mohammad, the Afghans recovered Balkh and Tashkurgan in 1850, Akcha and the four western khanates in 1855, and Kunduz in 1859. Dost Mohammad's earliest campaigns begin in the 1830s in the Afghan Turkestan Campaign of 1838-39. The sovereignty over Andkhoy, Shibarghan, Saripul, and Maymana was in dispute between Bukhara and Kabul until settled by the Anglo-Russian agreement of 1873 in favour of the Afghan claim. Under the strong rule of Abdur Rahman these outlying territories were closely welded to Kabul; but after the accession of Habibullah the bonds once more relaxed. In the late 19th and 20th centuries, many ethnic Pashtuns either voluntarily or involuntarily settled in Afghan Turkestan.

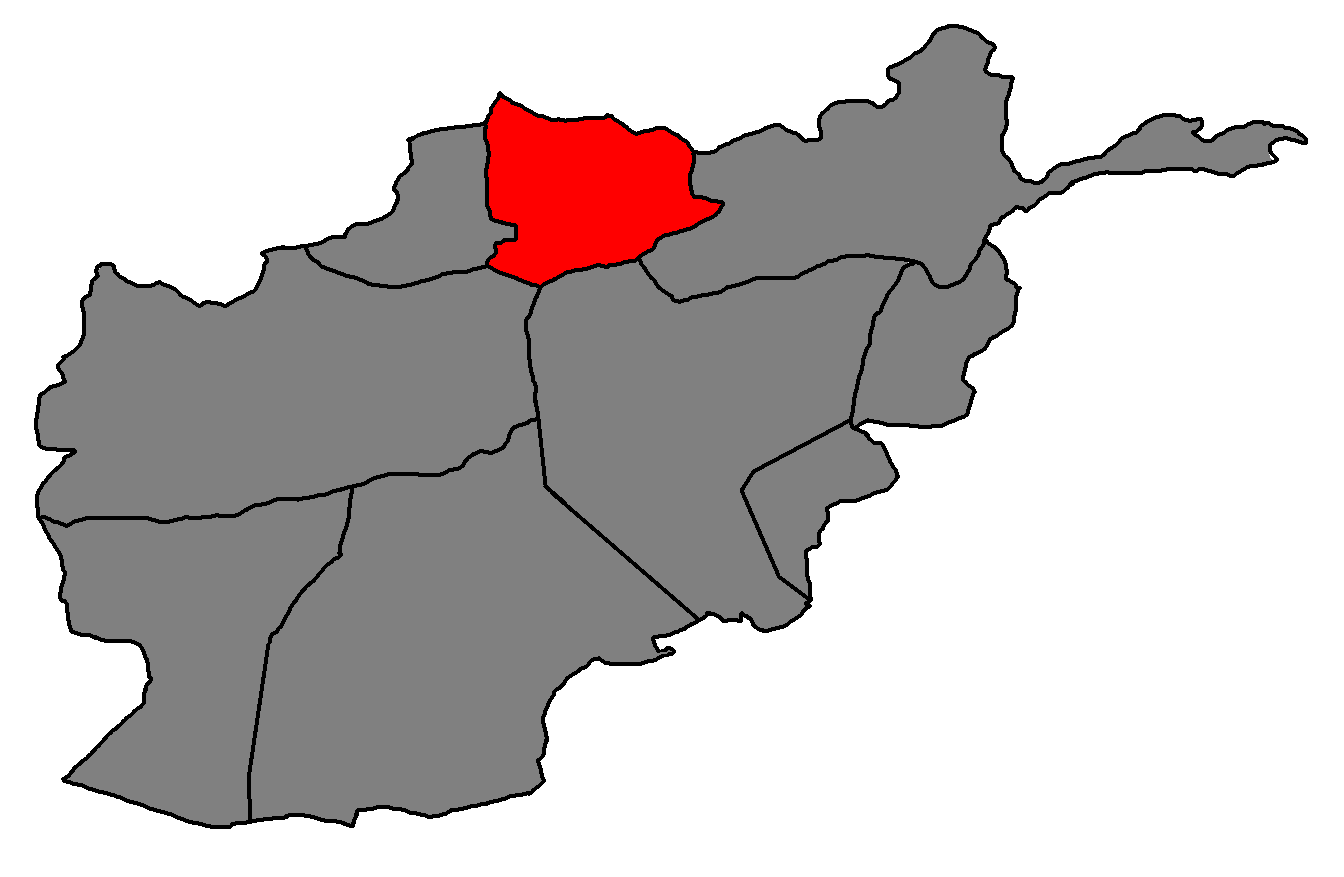
Afghan Turkestan Province in 1929

In 1890, the district of Qataghan and Badakhshan was divided from Afghan Turkestan and made into the Qataghan-Badakhshan Province. Administration of the province was assigned to the Northern Bureau in Kabul.

== See also ==
- Chinese Turkestan
- Russian Turkestan
- Turkestan Province
- Pashtunization of Afghan Turkestan
