= Emirate of Afghanistan =

Afghan state from 1823 to 1926

Coordinates: 34°32′N 69°08′E

Emirate of Kabul (1834–1855) د کابل امارت (Pashto) Emirate of Afghanistan (1855–1926) د افغانستان امارت (Pashto)
- 1823–1926
- Top Flag: 1897–1909; Bottom Flag: 1909–1921 Top Emblem: 1897–1909; Bottom Emblem: 1909–1921

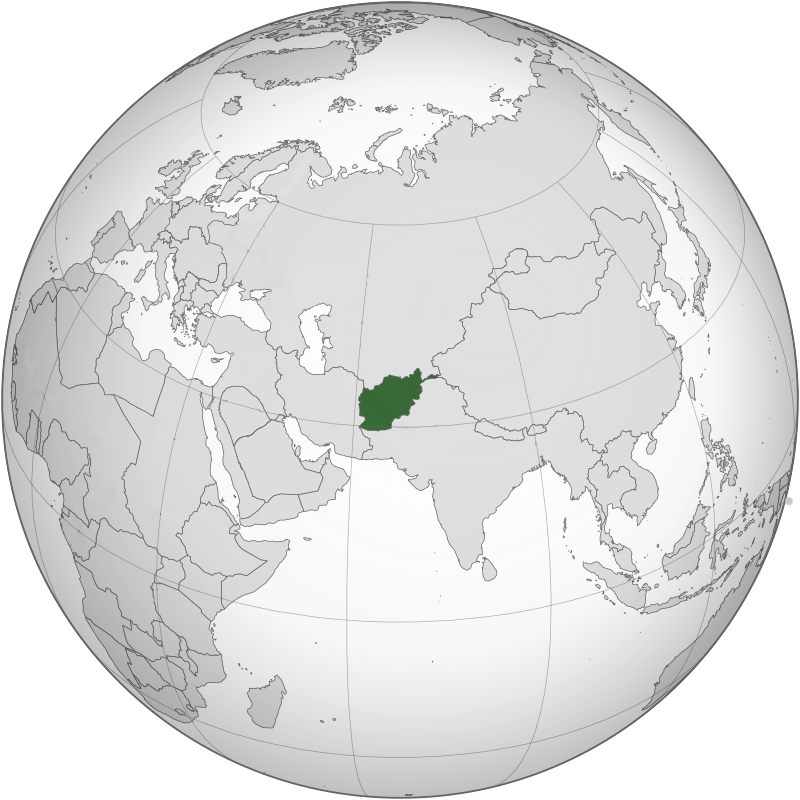
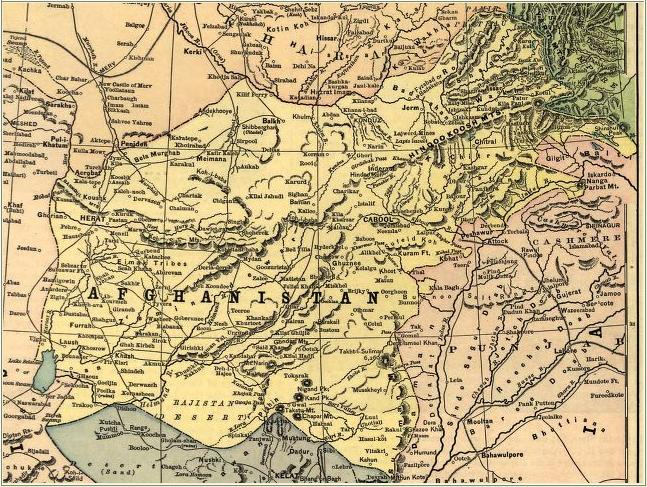
- Map of the Emirate of Afghanistan in 1914 (green); Afghanistan before the 1893 Durand Line Agreement (yellow)
- Status: Principality (1823–1834); Emirate (1834–1926); De jure British protected state (1879–1919) (Note: Despite agreeing to the terms of the Treaty of Gandamak, Abdur Rahman Khan held Afghanistan as a de-facto independent state by holding external affairs with other nations such as Persia and Russia, and often opposing the British.)
- Capital: Kabul; Ghazni (de facto, 1879–1880)
- Official languages: Pashto; Persian
- Spoken languages: Pashto; Persian; Uzbek; Turkmen; Balochi; Pashayi; Nuristani; Central Asian Arabic; Kyrgyz; others
- Ethnic groups: Pashtun, Tajik, Uzbek, Hazara, Persian, Aimaq, Turkmen, Baloch, Pashai, Nuristani, Gurjar, Arab, Brahui, Qizilbash, Pamiri, Kyrgyz, others
- Religion: Majority: Sunni Islam Minority: Twelver Shia Islam, Ismailism, Hinduism, Sikhism, Judaism, Christianity
- Demonym: Afghan (Note: from 1923)
- Government: Unitary Islamic emirate
- Sardar (1823–1834) Emir (1834–1926)
  - 1823–1824 (first): Habibullah Khan
  - 1919–1926 (last): Amanullah Khan
- Legislature: Loya Jirga
- History
  - Established: 1823
  - First Anglo-Afghan War: 1 October 1838
  - Restoration: April 1843
  - Unification and civil war: 9 June 1863
  - Treaty of Gandamak: 24 May 1879
  - Durand Line Agreement: 12 November 1893
  - Anglo-Afghan Treaty of 1919: 8 August 1919
  - Transformed into a kingdom: 9 June 1926
- Currency: Afghan rupee (1823–1923); Afghan afghani (from 1923)
Preceded by
Durrani Empire
Herat State
Principality of Kandahar
Maimana Khanate
Kunduz Khanate
Mirdom of Badakhshan
Succeeded by
Kingdom of Afghanistan
- Today part of: Afghanistan; Pakistan; Tajikistan; Turkmenistan; Iran

The Emirate of Afghanistan, (Note: Pashto: د افغانستان امارت, romanized: Da Afganistan Imarat Persian: امارت افغانستان, romanized: Imārat-i Afğānistān) known as the Principality of Kabul (Note: Pashto: د کابل سرداري Persian: سرداری کابل) before 1834, and as the Emirate of Kabul (Note: Pashto: امارت کابل, romanized: Da Kābul Imārat Persian: امارت کابل, romanized: Imārat-i Kābul) until 1855, and also referred to as the Guarded Domains of Afghanistan, (Note: Pashto: د افغانستان ساتل شوې مملکت, romanized: Da Afğānistān Satal Shawi Mamlakat Persian: ممالک محروسه افغانستان, romanized: Mamālik-i Mahrūsa-yi Afğānistān) the Sublime State of Afghanistan, (Note: Pashto: د افغانستان علي دولت, romanized: Da Afğānistān Ali Dawlat Persian: دولت علیه افغانستان, romanized: Dawlat-i Aliya-yi Afğānistān) and the God-Given State of Afghanistan, (Note: Pashto: د افغانستان خدای-ورکړی دولت, romanized: Da Afğānistān Khudaye Warkaraye Dawlat Persian: دولت خداداد افغانستان, romanized: Dawlat-i Xudādād-i Afğānistān) was an emirate in Central Asia that encompassed present-day Afghanistan, as well as parts of present-day Iran, Pakistan, Turkmenistan and Tajikistan. The emirate emerged from its predecessor, the Durrani Empire, after the Barakzai dynasty prevailed in Kabul.

The history of the Emirate was dominated by the 'Great Game' between the Russian Empire and the British Empire for supremacy in Central Asia. This period was characterized by European influence in Afghanistan. The Emirate of Afghanistan continued the Durrani Empire's war with the Sikh Empire, losing control of the former Afghan stronghold of the Valley of Peshawar at the Battle of Nowshera on 14 March 1823. This was followed in 1838 by the First Anglo-Afghan War with British forces. The war eventually resulted in victory for Afghans, with the British withdrawal in 1842, and Dost Mohammad being reinstalled to the throne. However, during the Second Anglo-Afghan War (1878–1880), the British and Afghans signed the Treaty of Gandamak, which allowed the British to assume control of the Afghan territories within modern-day Pakistan as well as of Afghanistan's foreign affairs, on the condition that a subsidy be paid to the Afghans and the British military fully withdraw. Emir Amanullah Khan signed the Anglo-Afghan Treaty of 1919 following the Third Anglo-Afghan War, gaining full Afghan autonomy, and the removal of Afghanistan's status of being a de-jure British protectorate. In 1926, Amanullah Khan reformed the country as the Kingdom of Afghanistan, becoming its first King.

== History ==
Escalated a few years after the establishment of the emirate, the Russian and British interests were in conflict between Muhammad Shah of Iran and Dost Mohammad Khan, which led to the First Anglo-Afghan War, fought between 1838 and 1842. During the war, Britain occupied the capital, Kabul, of the then called Emirate of Kabul, in an effort to prevent Afghanistan from coming under Russian control and curb Russian expansion in the region, while also keeping Afghanistan in the British fold under a puppet leader, Shah Shujah Durrani. The war ended with Dost Mohammad returning to the throne, with the British withdrawing; unable to subjugate the country, they forged greater ties instead, allowing Dost Mohammad to move toward uniting the dis-united state of Afghanistan, which split from the Durrani Civil wars brought on by the sons of Timur Shah.

Upon the death of Dost Mohammad in 1863, he was succeeded by his son, Sher Ali Khan. However, three years later, his older brother Mohammad Afzal Khan overthrew him. Upon the death of Mohammad Afzal Khan in 1867 due to cholera, his brother, Mohammad Azam Khan took the throne. However, with people's support for Sher Ali Khan, in 1868, Mohammad Azam Khan was overthrown and replaced as Emir by Sher Ali, who returned to the throne after spending few short years in exile in Russia. His return as Emir led to new conflicts with Britain. Subsequently, the British marched on 21 November 1878 into Afghanistan and Emir Sher Ali was forced to flee again to Russia, but he died in 1879 in Mazar-i-Sharif. His successor, Mohammad Yaqub Khan, sought solutions for peace with Russia and gave them a greater say in Afghanistan's foreign policy. Meanwhile, he signed the Treaty of Gandamak with the British on 26 May 1879, relinquishing solely the control of Afghanistan foreign affairs to the British Empire. However, when the British envoy Sir Louis Cavagnari was killed in Kabul on 3 September 1879, the British offered to accept Abdur Rahman Khan as Emir. The British concluded a peace treaty with the Afghans in 1880, and withdrew again in 1881 from Afghanistan. In 1893, Emir Abdur Rahman and the British Foreign Secretary, Sir Mortimer Durand, agreed to demarcate the border between British and Afghan territories, termed the Durand Line, which today cuts through the Pashtun tribal region.

After the war, Emir Abdur Rahman Khan, who struck down the country reformed and repressed numerous uprisings. After his death in 1901 his son Habibullah Khan II succeeded as emir and continued reforms. Habibullah Khan sought reconciliation with the UK, where he graduated in 1905 with a peace treaty with Russia, stretching for defeat in the Russo-Japanese War had to withdraw from Afghanistan. In the First World War, Afghanistan remained neutral, despite German and Ottoman efforts (Niedermayer–Hentig Expedition). In 1919 Habibullah Khan was assassinated by political opponents.

Habibullah Khan's son Amanullah Khan was in 1919 against the rightful heir apparent Nasrullah Khan, the then Emir of Afghanistan. Shortly afterwards another war broke which lasted for three months. This war was ended with the Anglo-Afghan Treaty of 1919 after which, the Afghans were able to resume the right to conduct their own foreign affairs as a fully independent state. Amanullah Khan began the reformation of the country and was crowned 1926 Padshah (king) of Afghanistan and founded the Kingdom of Afghanistan.

== Flags ==
The flags used by the Emirate of Afghanistan underwent numerous changes as Afghan emirs introduced a series of distinct banners ranging from monochrome standards to complex designs incorporating Islamic motifs, royal emblems, and modern state insignia due to administrative reforms. The first use of a coat of arms on a flag was during the reign of Emir Abdur Rahman Khan, which was a solid black banner featuring a white emblem in the center, to which the succeeding Afghan emblems trace their origins to.

The earliest records of the flag of the Emirate of Afghanistan traces to the reigns of Dost Mohammad Khan:

"In the reign of Amir Dōst Moḥammad and Šēr ʿAlī Khan there existed triangular, red and green military flags bearing the words of the Islamic confession of faith (šahāda) as well as the names of the four caliphs and verses from the Koran relating to jehād "holy war," all in white color."

After Ghulam Haidar Khan was captured during the Battle of Ghazni on 23 July 1839, two banners were seized by John Smith, which showed a triangular dark-red flag with a centered green circle featuring the names of the four Islamic caliphs in Ghulam Haidar's room, as well as another blue standard with designs in red and white, as well as words in red, mainly repeating the first part of the Islamic declaration of faith 15 times, implying the declaration of belief in the oneness of God.

Another standard hoisted by the followers of Mohammad Akbar Khan was captured by Armourer Sergeant Henry Ulyett during the Battle of Jalalabad on 7 April 1842, following the death of an Afghan standard-bearer in action. It was a red triangular flag with dark green outer layers, having a centered light blue traditional Islamic prayer niche with a dark yellow text featuring the Basmala with Quranic verses from the Chapter of As-Saff:

"In the name of God, the Most Gracious and Most Merciful, Help from Allah, and a victory near at hand"

This flag was also shown depicted by Afghan tribesmen during the Battle of Asmai Heights in the Second Anglo-Afghan War, and could possibly match with historical records that document the national standard under the reign of Sher Ali Khan:

"Amir Sher Ali's standard was triangular in shape, red and green, with Koranic inscriptions."

=== Former flags ===
Flag of Afghanistan (1823–1839)

Flag of Afghanistan (1843–1879)

War Flag until 1879

Flag of Afghanistan (1879–1880)

Flag of Afghanistan (1880–1892)

Flag of Afghanistan (1892–1897)

Flag of Afghanistan (1897–1909)

Flag of Afghanistan (1909–1921)

== List of rulers ==
=== Sardar of Kabul (1823–1834) ===
Name	Lifespan	Reign start	Reign end	Notes	Family	Image
Habibullah Khan	Unknown	1823	1823	Succeeded the Durrani Empire after ousting the final Durrani King Ayub Shah Durrani, by establishing his own independent principality in Kabul	Barakzai	
Yar Mohammad Khan	1790–1847	1823	1826	Overthrew his nephew Habibullah Khan	Barakzai	
Sultan Mohammad Khan	1795–1861	1826	6 May 1834	Succeeded following the resignation of his elder brother Yar Mohammad Khan, out of illness	Barakzai	
Dost Mohammad Khan	23 December 1792 – 9 June 1863			Overthrew his uterine brother Sultan Mohammad Khan in a coup	Barakzai	

=== Emir of Kabul (1834–1839) ===
Name	Lifespan	Reign start	Reign end	Notes	Family	Image
Dost Mohammad Khan	23 December 1792 – 9 June 1863	6 May 1834	2 August 1839	Assumed the title of "Emir" after taking the title of "Commander of the Faithful" after waging the holy war of Jihad against the Sikhs, beginning the Standoff at the Khyber Pass (1834–1835)	Barakzai dynasty	

=== Emir of Kabul (1843–1855) ===
Name	Lifespan	Reign start	Reign end	Notes	Family	Image
Dost Mohammad Khan	23 December 1792 – 9 June 1863	30 November 1855	April 1843	Restored the Emirate of Kabul after being re-installed to the throne by his son Mohammad Akbar Khan after the deposition of Shahpur Shah Durrani	Barakzai dynasty	

=== Emir of Afghanistan (1843–1926) ===
Name	Lifespan	Reign start	Reign end	Notes	Family	Image
Dost Mohammad Khan	23 December 1792 – 9 June 1863	30 November 1855	9 June 1863	Recognized by the British as "Emir of Afghanistan", despite contemporary maps featuring the name of Afghanistan.	Barakzai	
Sher Ali Khan	1825 – 21 February 1879	9 June 1863	10 May 1866	Succeeded following the natural death of his father Dost Mohammad Khan.	Barakzai	
Mohammad Afzal Khan	1815 – 7 October 1867	10 May 1866	7 October 1867	Overthrew his uterine brother Sher Ali Khan at the Battle of Shaikhabad during the Afghan Civil War (1863–1869).	Barakzai	
Mohammad Azam Khan	1820 – 12 October 1869	7 October 1867	8 September 1868	Succeeded following the natural death of his brother Mohammad Afzal Khan.	Barakzai	
Sher Ali Khan	1825 – 21 February 1879	8 September 1868	21 February 1879	Succeeded following the overthrow of Mohammad Azam Khan at the Battle of Tinah Khan during the Afghan Civil War (1863–1869).	Barakzai	
Mohammad Yaqub Khan	1849 – 15 November 1923	21 February 1879	19 October 1879	Succeeded following the natural death of his father Sher Ali Khan.	Barakzai	
Mohammad Musa Khan	1868–1951	19 October 1879	11 August 1880	Succeeded following the abdication of his father Mohammad Yaqub Khan.	Barakzai	
Abdur Rahman Khan	1844 – 1 October 1901	11 August 1880	1 October 1901	Succeeded following the overthrow of his first cousin once removed Mohammad Musa Khan.	Barakzai	
Habibullah Khan II	2 July 1872 – 20 February 1919	1 October 1901	20 February 1919	Succeeded after the natural death of his father Abdur Rahman Khan.	Barakzai	
Nasrullah Khan	7 April 1875 – 31 May 1920	19 October 1879	28 February 1919	Succeeded after the assassination of his brother Habibullah Khan II.	Barakzai	
Amanullah Khan	1 June 1892 – 26 April 1960	11 August 1880	9 June 1926	Succeeded after overthrowing his uncle at the 1919 Afghan coup d'état.	Barakzai	

== See also ==
The Emirate of Afghanistan and contemporary polities c. 1900
- List of emirs of Afghanistan
- Durrani dynasty & Barakzai dynasty
- Afghanistan–United Kingdom relations
- European influence in Afghanistan
- Invasions of Afghanistan
