= Turkestan Province =

Defunct province in Afghanistan

Province of Turkestan (1850–c. 1946) ولایت ترکستان Welāyat-e Turkestān Province of Mazar-i-Sharif (c. 1946–1964) ولایت مزار شريف Welāyat-e Mazār-e Sharīf
- Province of Afghanistan
- 1850–1964
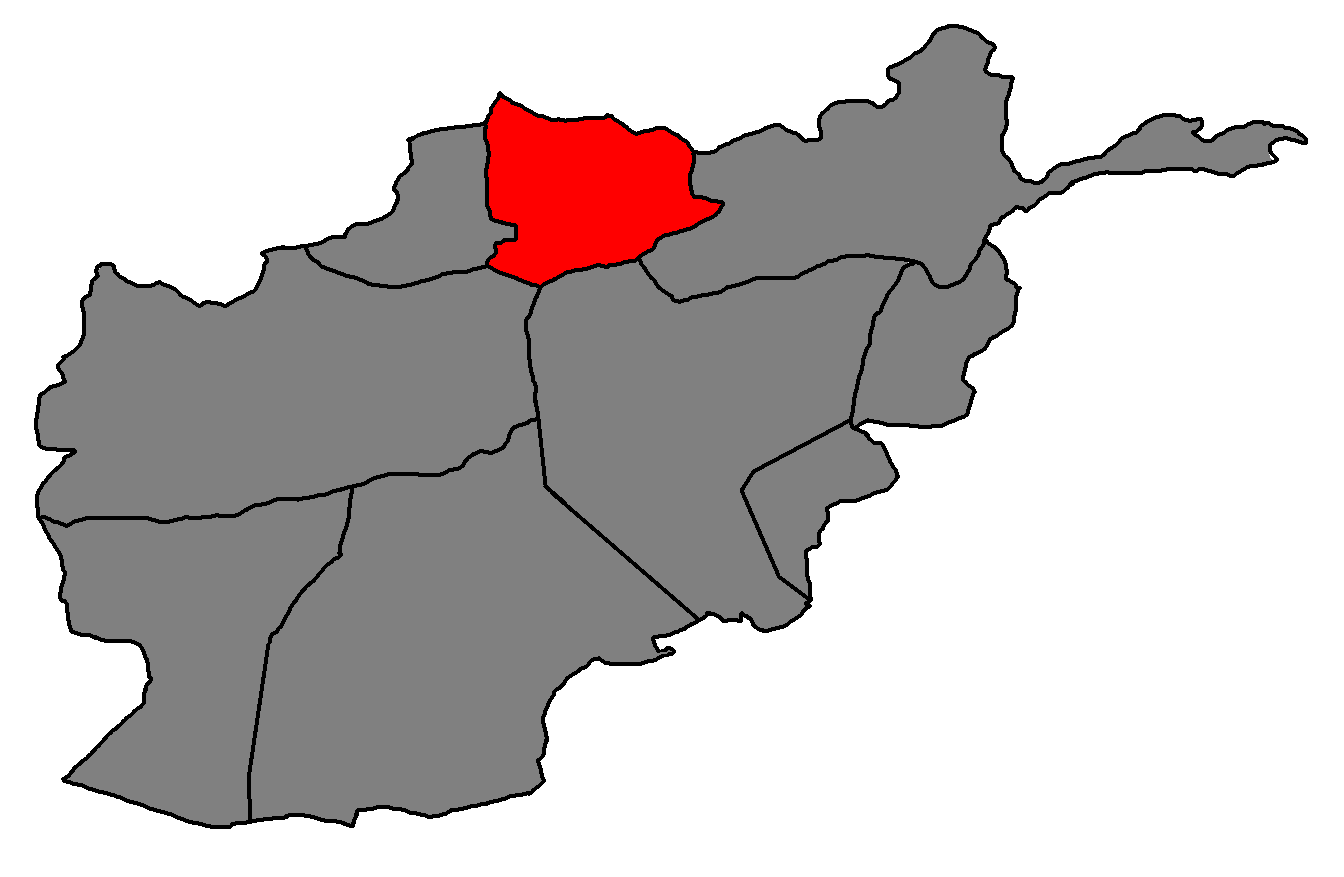
- Turkestan in 1929
- Capital: Balkh (1850–1854); Takhtapul (1854–1869/74); Mazar-i-Sharif (1869/74–1964)
- Demonym: Turkestani
- Government
  - Type: Province
- History
  - Established: 1850
  - Disestablished: 1964
Preceded by
1850: Khanate of Balkh
1855: Uzbek khanates
1859: Khanate of Kunduz
1859: Mirdom of Badakhshan
1905: District of Badakhshan (incl. Wakhan)
Succeeded by
1890: District of Badakhshan
1921: Province of Qataghan and Badakhshan
1921: High Governorate of Maimana
1958: Province of Sheberghan
1964: Province of Balkh
1964: Province of Samangan
- Today part of: Afghanistan

The Province of Turkestan (Persian: ولایت ترکستان, romanized: Wilāyat-i Turkistān), historically also known as Balkh, Afghan Turkestan or Lesser Turkestan and since the 1940s as the Province of Mazar-i-Sharif, was a province of Afghanistan, situated in the north of the country in the region historically known as Afghan Turkestan.

== History ==
With the Afghan conquest of the Khanate of Balkh in 1849, the region came under Kabul's direct control, and the province of Turkestan was established the following year, with Balkh serving as its capital. As the city was largely in ruins by that time, the capital was relocated in 1854 to Takhtapul by governor Muhammad Afzal Khan. The Afghan consolidation of the north proceeded in stages: following the conquest of Balkh and Tashkurgan in 1850, the western khanates of Aqcha, Sar-e Pol, Sheberghan, Andkhoy and Maimana were brought under Afghan control in 1855, and Kunduz in 1859, with the subjugated Khanate of Kunduz and the Mirdom of Badakhshan gradually integrated into the province thereafter. The sovereignty over Andkhoy, Sheberghan, Sar-e Pol and Maimana had been disputed between Bukhara and Kabul until settled in Afghanistan's favour by the Anglo-Russian agreement of 1873. The northern frontier was subsequently delimited by the Russo-Afghan Boundary Commission of 1885, an episode that gave rise to the Panjdeh incident. Between 1869 and 1873/74, governor Muhammad ʿAlam Khan transferred the seat of administration to Mazar-i-Sharif, which remained the provincial capital thereafter. Under the centralising rule of Abdur Rahman Khan, these outlying territories were closely integrated into the Afghan state, though the bonds of central control again relaxed following the accession of Habibullah Khan.

In 1890, the districts of Qataghan and Badakhshan were separated from Turkestan and merged into a unified district named Badakhshan under the administration of the Northern Bureau in Kabul. This arrangement proved temporary as by 1905, Badakhshan had been resubordinated to Turkestan, though it continued to function as a distinct "great political division" within the province under its own governor. The separation became permanent only with the administrative reorganisation under King Amanullah Khan in 1921/22, when Qataghan and Badakhshan was reconstituted as a distinct province. With the same decree, the western portion of the province — encompassing the former khanates of Maimana, Andkhoy, Darzab, and Gurziwan — was detached and reconstituted as the High Governorate of Maimana.

The name Turkestan is still present on an administrative map dated 1929, at which time the province was governed by Khwajah Mir Alam, who had possibly been assigned the office in January 1929 during the Afghan Civil War, when Habibullah Kalakani seized control of Kabul. Around 1946, coinciding with the national population census, the province was renamed Mazar-i-Sharif and had a population of 944,020. Between 1958 and 1964, the district of Sheberghan — encompassing the former khanates of Sheberghan, Aqcha, and Sar-e Pol — was separated to form its own province, reducing Mazar-i-Sharif to the territory of the former Khanate of Balkh and the portions of the historical Khanate of Kunduz west of the Kunduz River. Both Sheberghan and Mazar-i-Sharif were subsequently reorganised in the nationwide restructuring of 1964, resulting in the present-day province of Jowzjan and the provinces of Balkh and Samangan respectively.

== Political administration ==
In the 19th century, Afghan Turkestan was governed by a governor (hakim) appointed by the Amir. Below is a list of governors of Afghan Turkestan.

- Sardar Mohammad Akram Khan - 1850 - 1852
- Sardar Mohammad Afzal Khan - 1852 - 1864
- Sardar Fath Mohammad Khan - 1864 - 1865
- Fayz Mohammad Khan - 1865 - 1867
- Naib Muhammad Alam Khan - 1868 - 1876
- Shahghasi Sherdil Loynab Khan - 1876 -1878
- Sardar Abdul Wahab Khan - 1911 - 1919

== Subdivisions ==
In 1886 the administrative divisions of Afghan Turkestan were as follows:

1. Mazar-i Sharif (with the districts of Shor Tapa, Boinkara, Kishindi, Aq Kupruk, Tunj
2. Balkh (directly administered by the Sardar of Turkistan)
3. Aqcha (with the districts of Khwaja Salar and Dawlatabad)
4. Tashkorgan (with the districts of Pir Nakchir and Ghaznigak)
5. Sheberghan
6. Andkhui
7. Aybak
8. Dara-i Suf
9. Doab
10. Saighan and Kahmard
11. Balkh-ab (high up the Band-i Amir river)
12. Sangcharak
13. Sar-i Pol
14. Maimana

== See also ==
- Afghan Turkestan
