= Barakzai dynasty =

1818–1978 ruling dynasty of Afghanistan

Barakzai بارکزی
- Parent family: Durrani; Zirak; Barakzai; Mohammadzai; Shaghasi; Musahiban; Seraj
- Country: Principality of Kandahar (1818–1855); Emirate of Afghanistan Emirate of Kabul (1823–1855) Emirate of Afghanistan (1855–1926); Emirate of Herat (1857–1863); Kingdom of Afghanistan (1926–1973); Republic of Afghanistan (1973–1978)
- Founded: 1700s (Rulers of Afghanistan from 1818 to 1978)
- Founder: Dost Mohammad Khan
- Current head: Prince Muhammad Zahir Khan (disputed)
- Final ruler: Mohammad Daoud Khan (as President)
- Titles: Emir of Afghanistan; King of Afghanistan; President of Afghanistan; Sardar (Prince) of Afghanistan; Father of the Nation; Head of the House of Barakzai; Ruler of Kandahar
- Connected families: Sherzai; Achakzai
- Estates: Afghanistan, Khyber Pashtunkhwa and Balochistan
- Deposition: 1978 (Saur Revolution)
- Cadet branches: Seraj; Telai; Shaghasi

The Barakzai dynasty, (Note: Pashto: د بارکزیو لړۍ, romanized: Də Bārəkzyo ləṛǝy, pronounced [də bɑrəkˈzjo ləˈɽəɪ]) also known as the Muhammadzai dynasty ("the ruling sub-clan of the Barakzai"), ruled what is now Afghanistan from 1818 to 1978, when the monarchy ended de jure under Musahiban Mohammad Zahir Shah and de facto under his cousin Mohammad Daoud Khan. The Barakzai dynasty was established by Dost Mohammad Khan after the Durrani Empire of Ahmad Shah Durrani was removed from power.

== History and background ==
Alleged Israelite ancestry The Barakzai claimed descent from the children of Israel in a direct line through the first Israeli King Saul, whose family intermarried with the family of his successor King David. King Saul's grandson the Prince (Malak) Afghana was grown up by King Solomon, acting as his commander in chief and Manager in the construction of the Temple Mount. However Prince Afghana sought refuge in a place called "Takht-e-Sulaiman", where he settled as Exil Arch. A direct descendant of Prince Afghana in the 37th generation called Qais heard of the message of the Islamic prophet Muhammad and visited him in Medinah. Qais regarded Muhammad as the awaited Moschiach and embraced Islam under him. He changed his name Qais to Abdul Rashid Pathan and married a daughter of Khalid bin Walid.

Qais Abdur Rashid's descendant Sulaiman, also known as "Zirak Khan", is regarded as the forefather of the Durrani Pashtuns to whom the Barakzai also belonged, next to the Popalzai and Alakozai. It is through Sulaiman's son Barak, that the Barakzai derive their name from, because Barakzai means "children of Barak".

== History ==
The Barakzai dynasty was the line of rulers in Afghanistan in the 19th and 20th centuries. Following the fall of the Durrani Empire in 1823, chaos reigned in the domains of Ahmad Shah Durrani's Afghan Empire as various sons of Timur Shah struggled for supremacy. The Afghan Empire ceased to exist as a single nation state, disintegrating for a brief time into a fragmented collection of small units. Dost Mohammad Khan gained preeminence alongside his brother, Sultan Mohammad Khan in 1823. Dost Mohammad Khan would found the Barakzai dynasty in about 1837. Thereafter, his descendants ruled in direct succession until 1929, when King Amanullah Khan and his brother Inayatullah Khan abdicated and their cousin Mohammed Nadir Shah secured the throne after defeating Habibullah Kalakani. The most prominent and powerful sub-clan of the Barakzai Pashtun tribe is the Mohammadzai, from which the 1823–1973 Afghanistan ruling dynasty comes.

Prior the seizing of the Durrani empire by the Barakzai dynasty, Loy Qandahar was captured by the Dil Brothers, Sher Dil Khan, Pur Dil Khan, Kohan Dil Khan, Mehr Dil Khan and Rahim Dil Khan, in the year 1818 and declared their independence, which lasted as an independent state until 1855, when Amir Dost Mohammad Khan unified Qandahar with Kabul.

At the start of Barakzai rule over Emirate of Kabul in March 1823, the Afghans lost their former stronghold of the Peshawar Valley to the Sikh Khalsa Army of Ranjit Singh at the Battle of Nowshera. The Afghan forces in the battle were supported by Azim Khan, half-brother of Dost Mohammad Khan. During the Barakzai era, Afghanistan saw much of its territory lost to the British in the south and east, Persia in the west, and Russia in the north. There were also many conflicts within Afghanistan, including the three major Anglo-Afghan wars and the 1928–29 civil war.

== Definition and cadet branches ==
The Royal Barakzai or "Muhammadzai" are the descendants of the founder of the Barakzai dynasty the Emir ul Umara (Emir of all Emirs) Payindah Mohammed Khan, who plotted against the Durrani Imperial Family, proclaiming himself Emir. The hereditary title Sardar (Prince) is bestowed upon all descendants of Emir Payindah Mohammed.

=== Seraj ===
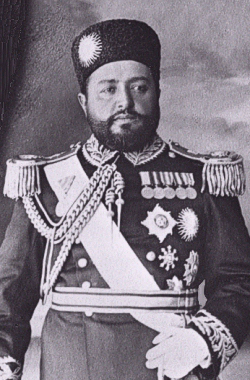
Emir Habibullah Khan, member of the Seraj cadet branch and Emir of Afghanistan

The Seraj cadet-branch are the descendants of Emir Dost Mohammed Khan, who alongside his predecessor and brother Sultan Mohammad Khan consolidated Barakzai rule in Afghanistan. The Seraj were mainly the Emirs of the first Emirate of Afghanistan that ended with the Saqqawist Coup led by Habibullah Kalakani. With support from the royal family, the Telai cadet branch killed Kalakani and re-established the second Barakzai Kingdom.

=== Telai ===
The Telai cadet-branch are the descendants of Sultan Mohammad Khan "Telai", 2nd Emir of Afghanistan succeeding his father Payindah Mohammed Khan. The descendants of His Royal Highness Prince Yahya Khan Telai (Yahya-Khel) to whom Nadir Shah and Zahir Shah belonged were closely related to Amanullah Khan through marriages.

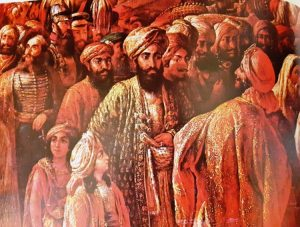
Sultan Mohammed Khan Telai (1792–1834). Regent of Kabul and of Peshawar; Son of Sardar Payendah Khan, brother of Dost Mohammad Khan.

Another Telai branch that had immense power in Afghanistan's military was that of His Royal Highness Field Marshal Prince Abdul Aziz Khan Telai and his children. Prince Abdul Aziz Telai was son of the Afghan King HM Sultan Mohammed Khan Telai and acted as a Field Marshal of the Afghan Army, preceding his grand-nephew Muhammad Nadir Shah as Minister of war under his other grand-nephew King Amanullah Khan. Prince Abdul Aziz additionally acted as Governor of Kandahar and Badakhshan. His eldest son was Prince Abdul Qayyum Khan, who acted as Governor of many central Afghan Provinces. Prince Abdul Qayyum Khan's son was the Afghan father of physics and Royal Afghan UN ambassador Professor Prince Abdul Khalek Khan Telai, who was a Murid (religious novice) of his father-in-law Mir Muhammad Jan son of Mir Fazlullah Agha. Prince Abdul Khalek's descendants consequently call themselves the Mir Muhammad Jan Khel and chose the surname Dakik (Persian for "Exact") after the Saur Revolution. Next to the title Sultan (above Sardar/Prince but below Shah/King), they also bear the title Mir and Sayyid to denote their descent to Muhammad through General Mir Muhammad Jan.

Another known son of Prince Abdul Aziz was Field Marshal Prince Amir Muhammad Khan Telai, who proclaimed himself Shah in exile in Peshawar contesting the rule of his rival cousin Mohammad Nadir Shah, siding with the British. His son Assadullah, whose nickname was "Sharza" became a general in the US Air Force, representing Telai interests in Washington DC.

Another well known son of Prince Abdul Aziz was Brigade General Sardar Abdul Ghafar Khan, who acted as commander of the Personal Royal Brigade of his cousin King Nadir Shah. Prince Abdul Ghafar Khan executed the Amanist Charkhi family, who had plotted against his cousin HM King Nadir Shah. These executions made by Prince Abdul Ghaffar Khan led to Ghulam Nabi Khan Charkhi's daughter convincing a Hazara Amanist called Abdul Khaliq Hazaragi to take revenge for the Charkhi family's massacre and murder King Nadir Shah.

=== Shaghasi ===
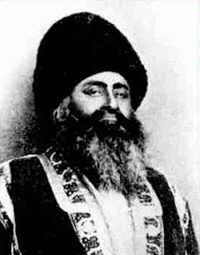
Loynab Shir Dil Khan Shaghasi' son of Shaghasi Mirdaad Khan Barakzai, grand son of Bazar Khan Barakzai, and great-grandson of Sardar Yasin Khan Barakzai. Işik Aqasi (Minister of the Royal Court "Chemberlain") to Dost Mohammad Khan 1856, and Sher Ali Khan. Regional Sardar, Governor of Turkistan and Balkh, and the first and only Loynaad of Afghanistan during the Barakzai dynasty.

The Shaghasi cadet-branch is another prominent and powerful sub-tribe of Barakzai, descending from the brothers of Emir Sultan Mohammed Khan and Emir Dost Mohammed Khan.

Shaghasi Khel are descendants of Mirdaad Khan Barakzai, Işik Aqasi (Minister of the Royal Court "Chemberlain") during the reign of the Kandahari Sardars (Dost Muhammad Khan's brothers), as well as the reign of Dost Muhammad Khan 1863 – 1866 and 1868 – 1879. His father, Bazar Khan Barakzai was a local Barakzai chief, and his grandfather was Sardar Yasin Khan Omar Khanzai (Barakzai), resident of Maruf District (at that time part of Arghistan District) of Kandahar, and one of the notable Sardars of Kandahar during the reigns of Timur Shah Durrani and brother to Muhammad of the Mohammadzai. The Shaghasi's were even more powerful than the Mohammadzai's during the ruling of Emir Sher Ali Khan – Emir of Afghanistan, and Emir Amanullah Khan – Emir of Afghanistan (February 28, 1919 – 1926), later King of Afghanistan (1926 – January 14, 1929). Prominent Afghan historian, Abdul Hai Habibi denotes that during King Amanullah Khan's reign, the former governor of Kabul was Mahmoud Khan Yawar and the later one was Ali Ahmad Khan (both Shaghasi) Barakzai. Abdul Aziz Khan (later Minister of war, and Prime Minister, Mohammad Sarwar Khan and Abdul Karim Khan were Naib -ul- Hukuma's (all of them were Shaghasi) Barakzai. In Mazar-e-Sharif and Herat Abdul Karim and Mohammad Ibrahim Khan (later Minister) were also Khan Naib -ul- Hukuma's, and Abdul Rahman and Nik Mohammad Khan were Firqa Meshar (all of them were Shaghasi) Barakzai. Abdul Karim Khan in Paktya, and Dost Mahammad Khan Nazim (later Naib Salar, Sipah

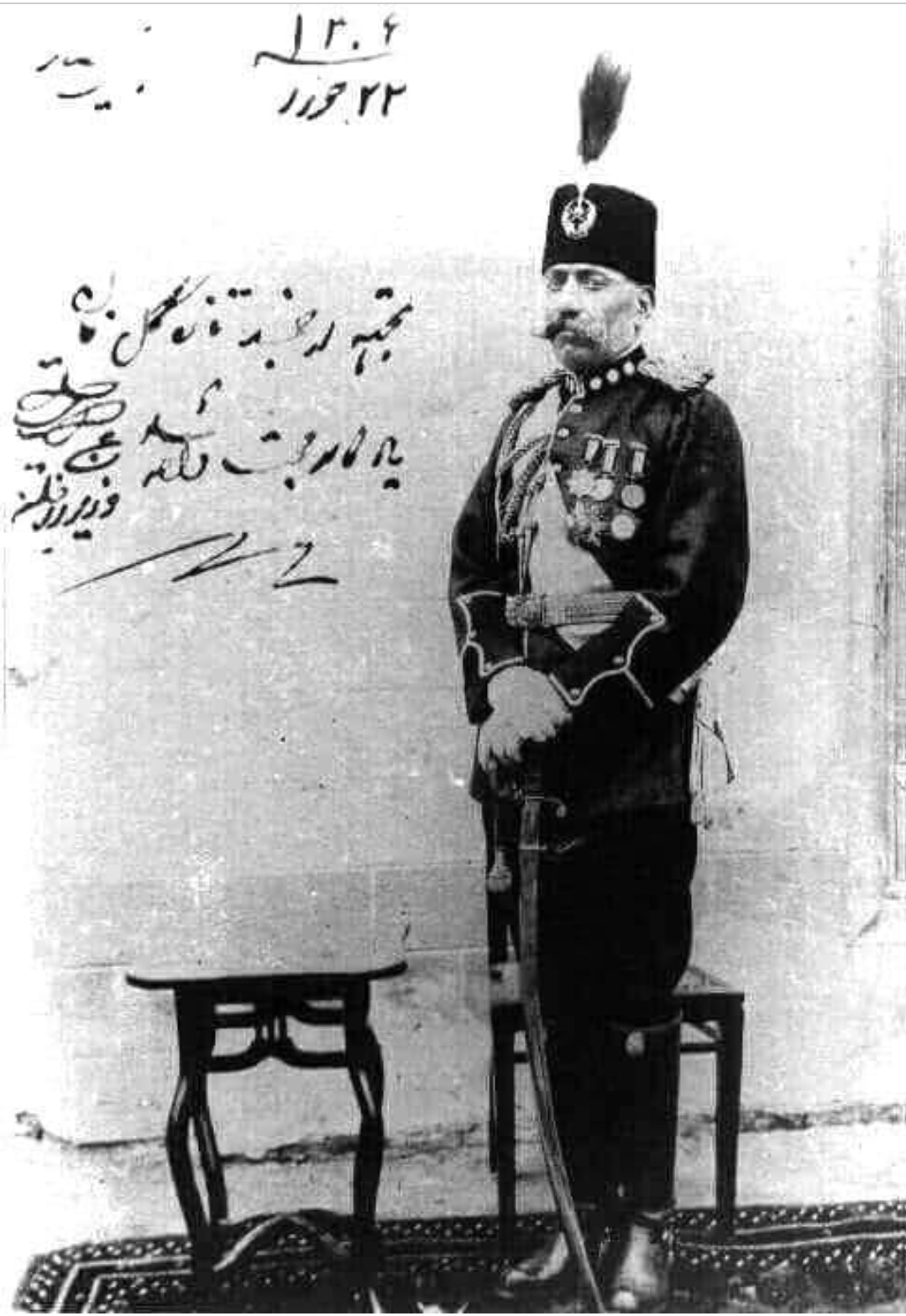
Field Marshal Wazir Abdul Aziz Khan Shaghasi. Minister of war and interior affairs under King Amanullah Khan.

Salar, Dar-ul-Adalat, and Hakim-e-Ala) in Ghazni, Uruzgan and Kandahar

were equally (Shaghasi) Barakzai, Mohammad Alam Khan in Lugar and Kuchi and other governors were the same. To the Shaghasi Khel is related King Amanullah Khan's mother Queen Sarwar Sultana Begum, Siraj ul-Khwatin, the Aliya Hazrat (b. at Kabul, 1875; d. at Istanbul, Turkey, 1965), eldest daughter of Loinab Sher Dil Khan Shaghasi, by his third wife, Benazir Begum, a lady from the Popalzai clan.

Ali Ahmad Khan Shaghasi (1883–1929) who was declared Emir of Afghanistan twice in 1929 son of General Loinab Khushdil Khan, sometime Governor of Kabul and Kandahar, by his wife Sahira Begum, daughter of Amir al-Mumenin, Amir al-Kabir, Amir Dost Muhammad Khan, Amir of Afghanistan, by his wife, a daughter of Agha Muhammad Qizilbash was also Shaghasi Barakzai. Ali Ahmad's sister, the Ulya Mukhadara Zarin Jan Begum was the mother of Humaira Begum who was the Queen consort of Afghanistan.

== List of Barakzai rulers ==
Principality of Kandahar (1818–1855)

Name	Lifespan	Reign start	Reign end	Notes	Family	Image
Sher Dil Khan		1818	July 1828	Sardar Sher Dil Khan son of Sardar Payendah Khan, grand son of Sardar Jamal Khan Barakzai. Shaghasi Mirdaad Khan Barakzai' son of Bazar Khan Barakzai, grand son of Sardar Yasin Khan Barakzai, as his Işik Aqasi (Minister of the Royal Court "Chemberlain").	Barakzai	
Pur Dil Khan		1828	1830	Sardar Pur Dil Khan' son of Sardar Payendah Khan, grand son of Sardar Jamal Khan Barakzai. Shaghasi Mirdaad Khan Barakzai' son of Bazar Khan Barakzai, grand son of Sardar Yasin Khan Barakzai, as his Işik Aqasi (Minister of the Royal Court "Chemberlain").	Barakzai	
Kohan Dil Khan	1792–1855	1818	1855	Sardar Kohan Dil Khan' son of Sardar Payendah Khan, grand son of Sardar Jamal Khan Barakzai.Acted as King of Qandahar. Son of Sardar Payendah Khan. Was also Regent of Bamiyan and military regent of Kashmir. Was buried at the shrine of Hz. Ge Baba in Qandahar, used as mausoleum for the Qandahari Kings. Shaghasi Mirdaad Khan Barakzai' son of Bazar Khan Barakzai, grand son of Sardar Yasin Khan Barakzai, as his Işik Aqasi (Minister of the Royal Court "Chemberlain").	Barakzai	
Rahim Dil Khan (Note: Disputed with Mohammad Sadiq Khan)		1855	1855	Son of Sardar Kohan Dil Khan, grand son of Sardar Payendah Khan Barakzai. was in 1838 regent of Farah	Barakzai	
Dost Mohammad Khan		1855		Unified the principality of Qandahar with the Emirate of Kabul to Emirate of Afghanistan.	Barakzai	

Emirate of Afghanistan (1823–1926)

Name	Lifespan	Reign start	Reign end	Notes	Family	Image
Sultan Mohammad Khan: The Golden Sultan	1792–1834	1823	1826 (resigned)	Regent of Kabul and of Peshawar; Son of Sardar Payendah Khan, brother of Dost Mohammad Khan	Barakzai	Sultan Mohammad Khan Telai of Afghanistan
Dost Mohammad Khan (1st reign): Commander of the Faithful The Great Emir	23 December 1792 – 9 June 1863	Summer 1826	6 August 1839 (deposed)	Shaghasi Mirdaad Khan Barakzai' son of Bazar Khan Barakzai, grand son of Sardar Yasin Khan Barakzai, as his Işik Aqasi (Minister of the Royal Court "Chemberlain"). Son of Sardar Payendah Khan, grand son of Sardar Jamal Khan Barakzai Forged campaigns to re-unite Afghanistan which was divided due to the civil wars between the sons of Timur Shah Durrani. Reign disputed from 1839 to 1842 by Shah Shuja Durrani in the First Anglo-Afghan War	Barakzai	Dost Mohammad Khan of Afghanistan
Mohammad Akbar Khan	1816–1847	May 1842	1843	Shaghasi Shir Mohammad Khan' son of Shaghasi Mirdaad Khan Barakzai, grand son of Bazar Khan Barakzai, as his Işik Aqasi (Minister of the Royal Court "Chemberlain"). Son of Dost Mohammad Khan, grand son of Sardar Payendah Khan Barakzai	Barakzai	Mohammad Akbar Khan of Afghanistan
Dost Mohammad Khan (2nd reign): Commander of the Faithful The Great Emir	23 December 1792 – 9 June 1863	1843	9 June 1863	Shaghasi Mirdaad Khan Barakzai' son of Bazar Khan Barakzai, grand son of Sardar Yasin Khan Barakzai, as his Işik Aqasi (Minister of the Royal Court "Chemberlain"). Son of Sardar Payendah Khan, grand son of Sardar Jamal Khan Barakzai Loynab Shir Dil Khan Shaghasi' son of Shaghasi Mirdaad Khan Barakzai, grand son of Bazar Khan Barakzai, as his Işik Aqasi (Minister of the Royal Court "Chemberlain") 1856. Returned to the throne after the British and Shah Shuja were defeated in the First Anglo-Afghan War. Coined the term "Afghanistan" after an alliance with the British. Went on to defeat the remaining powers inside Afghanistan, reunifying the country after a brutal civil war lasting 70 years from 1793 to 1863 by the time of his death	Barakzai	Dost Mohammad Khan of Afghanistan
Sher Ali Khan (1st reign): Commander of the Faithful	1825 – 21 February 1879	9 June 1863	May 1866 (deposed)	Loynab Shir Dil Khan Shaghasi' son of Shaghasi Mirdaad Khan Barakzai, grand son of Bazar Khan Barakzai, as his Işik Aqasi (Minister of the Royal Court "Chemberlain"). Son of Dost Mohammad Khan, grad son of Sardar Payendah Khan	Barakzai	Sher Ali Khan of Afghanistan
Mohammad Afzal Khan: Commander of the Faithful	1815 – 7 October 1867	May 1866	7 October 1867	Son of Dost Mohammad Khan	Barakzai	Mohammad Afzal Khan of Afghanistan
Mohammad Azam Khan: Commander of the Faithful	1820–1870	7 October 1867	21 August 1868	Son of Dost Mohammad Khan	Barakzai	Mohammad Azam Khan of Afghanistan
Sher Ali Khan (2nd reign): Commander of the Faithful	1825 – 21 February 1879	9 September 1868	21 February 1879	Loynab Shir Dil Khan Shaghasi' son of Shaghasi Mirdaad Khan Barakzai, grand son of Bazar Khan Barakzai, as his Işik Aqasi (Minister of the Royal Court "Chemberlain"). Son of Dost Mohammad Khan, grand son of Sardar Payendah Khan. Mohammad Yusof Khan Shaghasi' son of Loynab Shir Dil Khan Shaghasi, grand son of Shaghasi, as his Işik Aqasi (Minister of the Royal Court "Chemberlain"). 1874	Barakzai	Sher Ali Khan of Afghanistan
Mohammad Yaqub Khan: Commander of the Faithful	1849 – 15 November 1923	21 February 1879	12 October 1879 (deposed)	Sardar Attaullah Khan Shaghasi' son of Shaghasi Mirdaad Khan Barakzai, grand son of Bazar Khan Barakzai, as his Işik Aqasi (Minister of the Royal Court "Chemberlain"). Son of Sher Ali Khan, grand son of Dost Mohammad Khan Deposed during the Second Anglo-Afghan War	Barakzai	Mohammad Yaqub Khan of Afghanistan
Mohammad Ayub Khan: Victor of Maiwand Afghan Prince Charlie	1857 – 7 April 1914	12 October 1879	31 May 1880 (deposed)	Ghazi Khoshdil Khan Shaghasi' son of Loynab Shir Dil Khan Shaghasi, grand son of Shaghasi Mirdaad Khan Barakzai, as his Işik Aqasi (Minister of the Royal Court "Chemberlain"), and the second commander in the Battle of Maiwand. Later Kamkainaab, Loynaad, Governor of Kabul, Balkh and Kandahar during the reigns of Sher Ali Khan, Habibullah Khan, and Amanullah Khan. Son of Sher Ali Khan, grand son Dost Mohammad Khan. Defeated in the Battle of Kandahar against Abdur Rahman Khan and exiled at the end of the Second Anglo-Afghan War	Barakzai	Mohammad Yaqub Khan of Afghanistan
Abdur Rahman Khan: The Iron Emir Light of the Religion and the Faith Bismarck of Afghanistan	1840/44 – 1 October 1901	31 May 1880	1 October 1901	Sardar Mohammad Sarwar Khan Shaghasi (Baba)' son of Sardar Attaullah Khan Shaghasi, gran son of Shaghasi Mirdaad Khan Barakzai, as his Işik Aqasi (Minister of the Royal Court "Chemberlain"). Son of Mohammad Afzal Khan, grand son of Dost Mohammad Khan	Barakzai	Abdur Rahman Khan of Afghanistan
Habibullah Khan: Lamp of the Religion and the Faith	3 June 1872 – 20 February 1919	1 October 1901	20 February 1919	Mohammad Shah Khan Shaghasi' son of Sardar Amir Mohammad Shaghasi, gran son of Shaghasi Mirdaad Khan Barakzai, as his Işik Aqasi (Minister of the Royal Court "Chemberlain") when Habibullah Khan was still a Crown prince. Nazim Dost Mohammad Khan Shaghasi' son of Sardar Amir Mohammad Shaghasi, gran son of Shaghasi Mirdaad Khan Barakzai, as his Işik Aqasi (Minister of the Royal Court "Chemberlain"). Later Nazim (Leading Commander of Central Afghanistan), Nayabsalar (Lieutenant General), Sepahsalaar (General), the first Dar-ul-Adalat (Minister of Justice), Hakim-e-Ala (Great Governor) of Ghazni, Uruzgan and Kandahar during the reigns of Abdur Rahman Khan, Habibullah Khan, and Amanullah Khan. Son of Abdur Rahman Khan, grand son of Mohammad Afzal Khan	Barakzai	Habibullah Khan of Afghanistan
Nasrullah Khan	1874–1920	20 February 1919	28 February 1919 (deposed)	Khwaja Mohammad Khan Shaghasi' son of Sardar Amir Mohammad Shaghasi, gran son of Shaghasi Mirdaad Khan Barakzai, as his Işik Aqasi (Minister of the Royal Court "Chemberlain") when Nasrullah Khan was Hakim (Governor) of Qalaat. Nazim Dost Mohammad Khan Shaghasi' son of Sardar Amir Mohammad Shaghasi, gran son of Shaghasi Mirdaad Khan Barakzai, as his Işik Aqasi (Minister of the Royal Court "Chemberlain"). Later Nazim (Leading Commander of Central Afghanistan), Nayabsalar (Lieutenant General), Sepahsalaar (General), the first Dar-ul-Adalat (Minister of Justice), Hakim-e-Ala (Great Governor) of Ghazni, Uruzgan and Kandahar during the reigns of Abdur Rahman Khan, Habibullah Khan, and Amanullah Khan. Son of Abdur Rahman Khan, grand son of Mohammad Afzal Khan	Barakzai	Nasrullah Khan of Afghanistan
Amanullah Khan: Ghazi	1 June 1892 – 25 April 1960	28 February 1919	9 June 1926	Yawar Mahmoud Khan Shaghasi' son of Mohammad Shah Khan Shaghasi, grand son of Sardar Amir Mohammad Shaghasi, as his Işik Aqasi (Minister of the Royal Court "Chemberlain"). Later the first Yawar Awal (Vice president), and Governor of Kabul during the reign of Amanullah Khan. Son of Habibullah Khan, grand son of Abdur Rahman Khan	Barakzai	Amanullah Khan of Afghanistan

Kingdom of Afghanistan (1926–1929)

Name	Lifespan	Reign start	Reign end	Notes	Family	Image
Amanullah Khan	1 June 1892 – 25 April 1960	9 June 1926	14 January 1929 (abdicated)	Yawar Mahmoud Khan Shaghasi' son of Mohammad Shah Khan Shaghasi, grand son of Sardar Amir Mohammad Shaghasi, as his Işik Aqasi (Minister of the Royal Court "Chemberlain"). Later the first Yawar Awal (Vice president), and Governor of Kabul during the reign of Amanullah Khan. Son of Habibullah Khan, grand son of Abdur Rahman Khan	Barakzai	Amanullah Khan of Afghanistan
Inayatullah Khan	20 October 1888 – 12 August 1946	14 January 1929	17 January 1929 (deposed)	Abdul Habib Khan Shaghasi' son of Mohammad Shah Khan Shaghasi, grand son of Sardar Amir Mohammad Shaghasi, as his Işik Aqasi (Minister of the Royal Court "Chemberlain"). Later Minister of Education during the reign of Amanullah Khan. Son of Habibullah Khan, grand son of Abdur Rahman Khan	Barakzai	Inayatullah Khan of Afghanistan

Saqqawist Emirate and the 1928–1929 civil war

Name	Lifespan	Reign start	Reign end	Notes	Family	Image
Ali Ahmad Khan	1883 – 11 July 1929	17 January 1929. 23 June 1929	9 February 1929. 3 July 1929	Son of Ghazi Khoshdil Khan Shaghasi, grand son of Loynab Shir Dil Khan Shaghasi. Declared twice as King; rose in opposition to Kalakāni during the 1928–29 civil war; captured and executed	Barakzai	Ali Ahmad Khan of Afghanistan
Amanullah Khan	1 June 1892 – 25 April 1960	March 1929		Son of Habibullah Khan, grand son of Abdur Rahman Khan Former King; returned to Afghanistan to contest the throne during the 1928–29 civil war; eventually retreated back into British India; See also Amanullah loyalism	Barakzai	Amanullah Khan of Afghanistan

Kingdom of Afghanistan (restored; 1929–1973)

Name	Lifespan	Reign start	Reign end	Notes	Family	Image
Mohammed Nadir Shah	9 April 1883 – 8 November 1933	15 October 1929	8 November 1933	Great-nephew of Dost Mohammed Khan Assassinated by Abdul Khaliq Hazara	Barakzai	Mohammed Nadir Shah of Afghanistan
Mohammed Zahir Shah: Father of the Nation (from 2004)	15 October 1914 – 23 July 2007	8 November 1933	17 July 1973 (deposed)	Son of Mohammed Nadir Shah Deposed by first cousin Mohammed Daoud Khan in the 1973 coup d'état	Barakzai	Mohammed Zahir Shah of Afghanistan

Republic of Afghanistan (1973–1978)

Name	Lifespan	Reign start	Reign end	Notes	Family	Image
Mohammad Daoud Khan	1909–1978	17 July 1973	28 April 1978	Prince of the Barakzai Dynasty as great grandson of Sultan Mohammed Khan Telai De jure no monarch, but de facto continuation of an authoritarian Barakzai Leadership Murdered in the Saur Revolution	Barakzai	His Royal Highness Sardar Mohammad Daoud Khan of Afghanistan

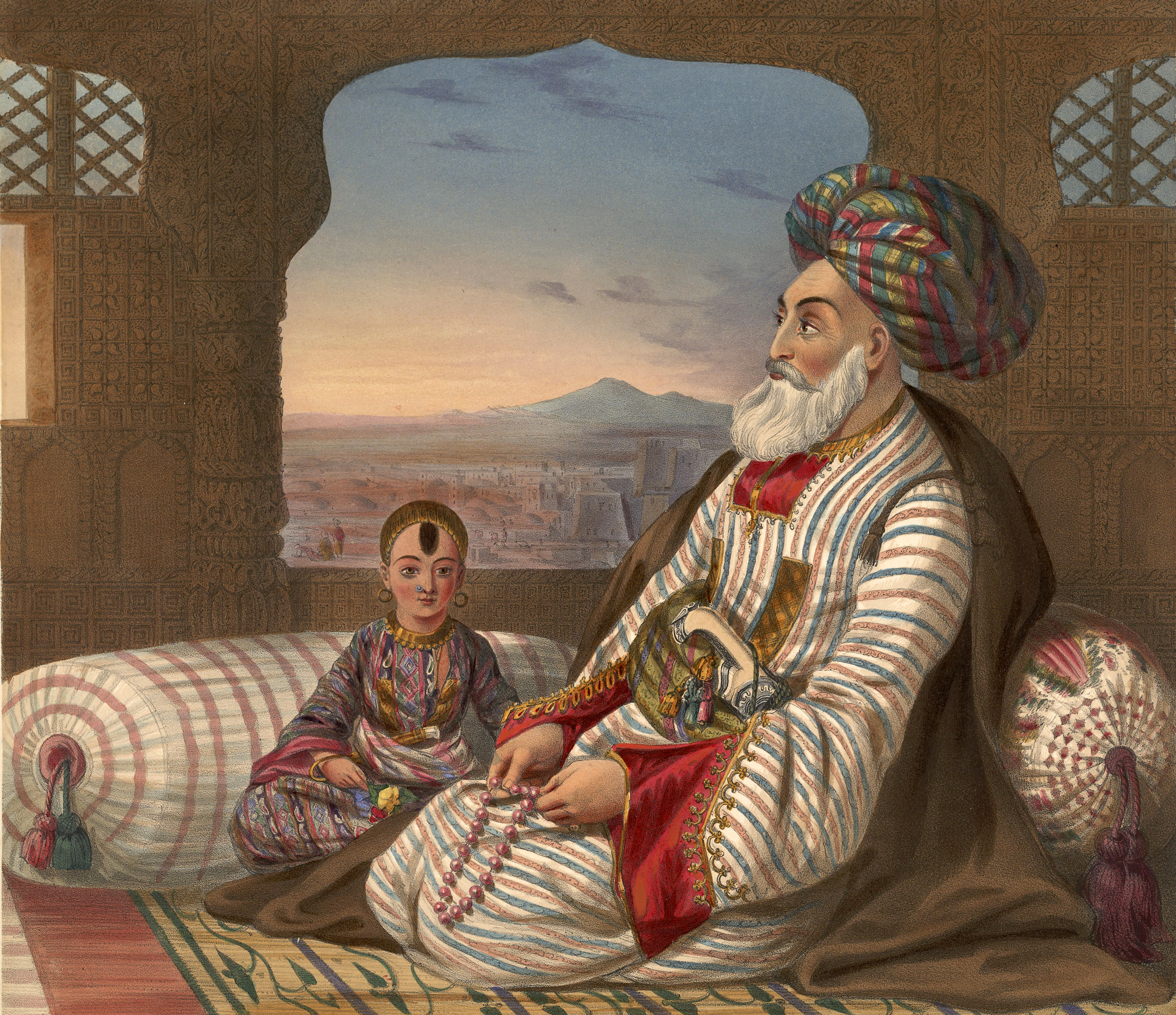
Amir-ul-Momineen, Amir-i-Kabir Dost Mohammad Khan, who established the Barakzai dynasty in 1823

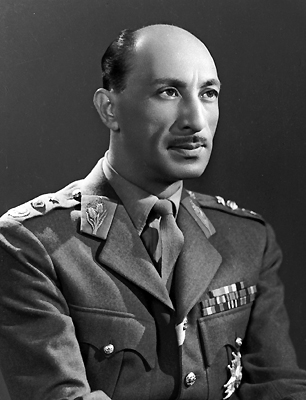
Mohammad Zahir Shah, was the last King (Badshah) of Afghanistan, reigning for four decades, from 1933 until he was ousted by a coup in 1973, he belonged to the Mohammadzai tribe

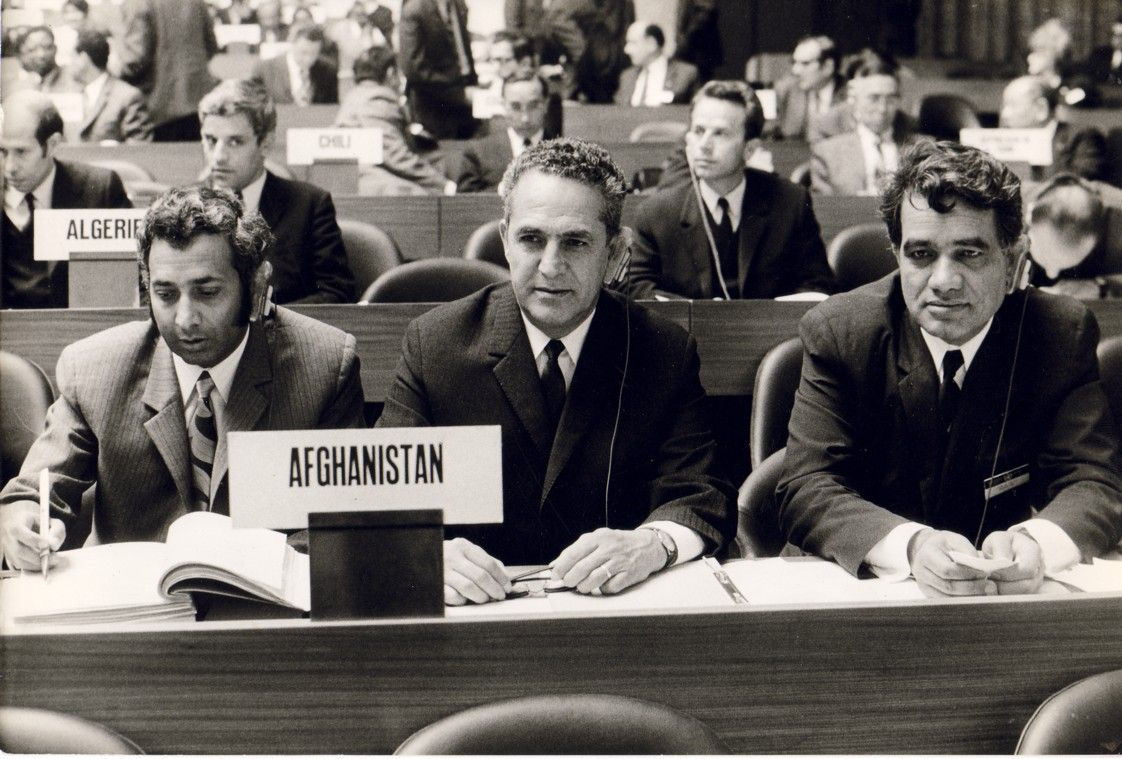
Sardar Abdul Khaliq Khan Telai, Prof. PhD (Sorbonne), Ambassador of Afghanistan to the UN, pioneer of physics in Afghanistan. He was great grandson of King Sultan Mohammad Khan Telai and a close ally of HRH Prince Daoud Khan, supporting his rule.

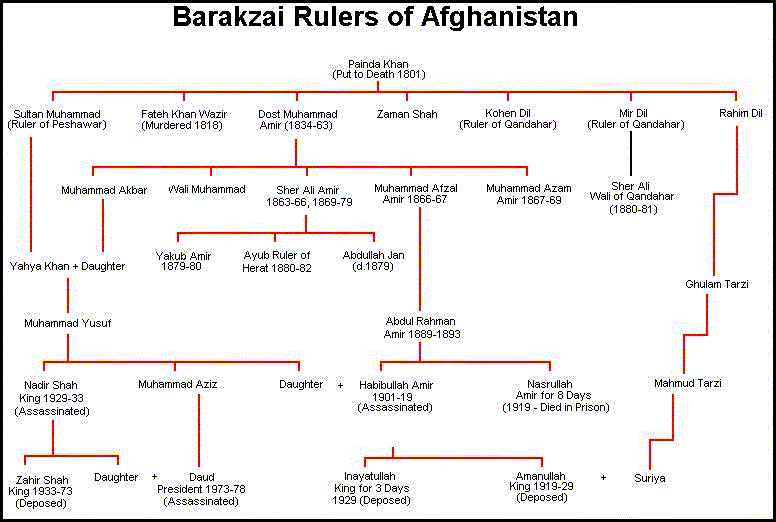
Genealogy of the Barakzai rulers of Afghanistan from the Barakzai dynasty

=== Heads of the House of Barakzai since 1973 ===
- Mohammad Daoud Khan As first president of Afghanistan, renouncing the title Shah after taking power (1973–1978)
- Abdul Khaliq Khan, for Saratanists as the lone Barakzai survivor of the Saur Purge (1978–1992)
- Mohammad Zahir Shah (17 July 1978 – 23 July 2007)
- Crown Prince Sardar Ahmad Shah Khan (1964 Constitution of Afghanistan) (23 July 2007 – 4 June 2024)
- Prince Muhammad Zahir Khan (4 June 2024 – present)

== Languages ==
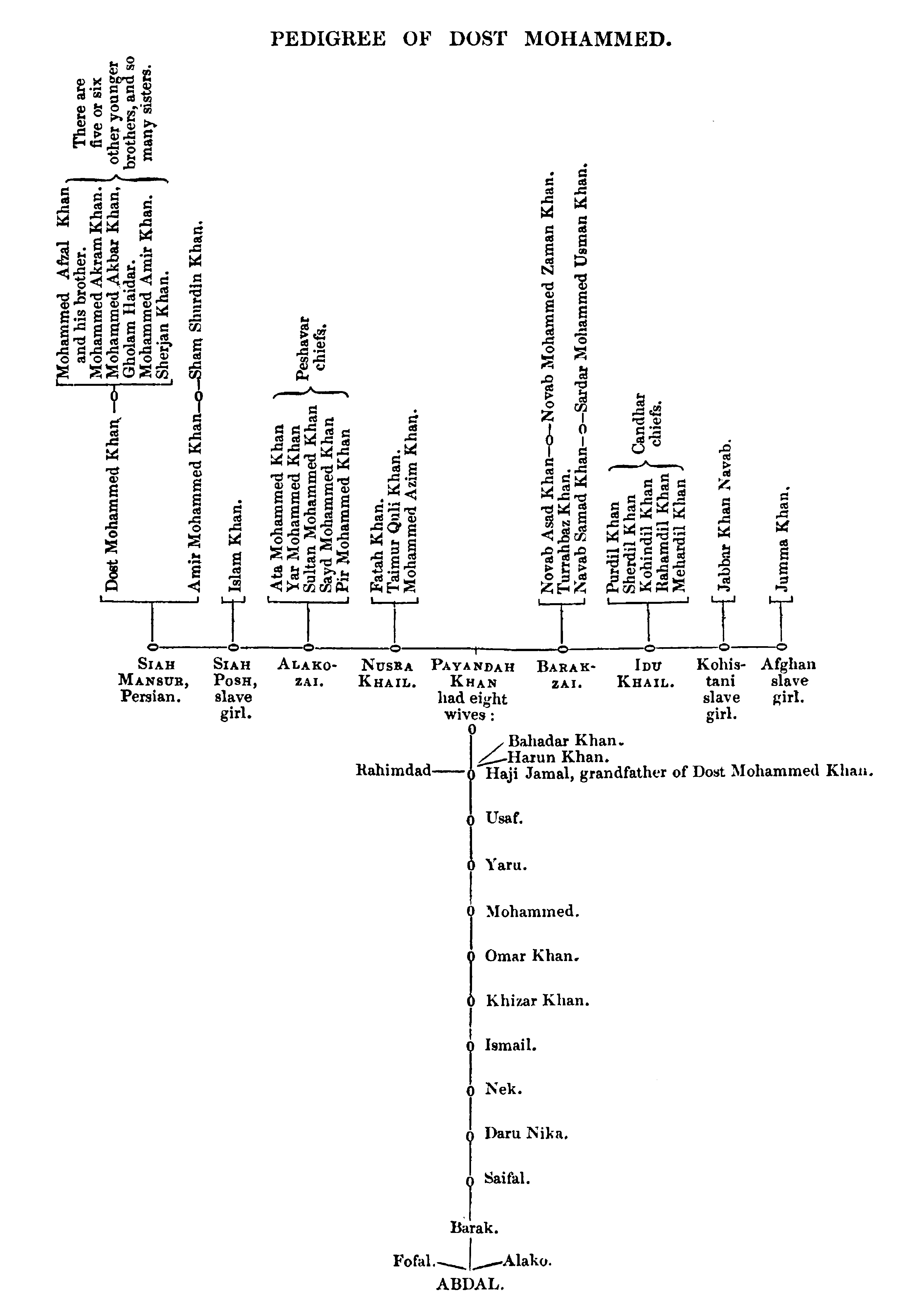
Predigree of King Dost Mohammad Khan of Afghanistan. Figure shows the branching of the Abdal dynasty into the Popal (founder of the Popalzai; in figure spelled 'Fofal'), Barak (founder of the Barakzai), and Alako (founder of the Alakozai) line (the fourth branch Achakzai is missing).

The principal language of the Barakzai is Pashto. Formerly, Persian was used as the language for records and correspondence; until the late nineteenth century tombstones were also inscribed in Persian. The language of the Barakzai tribes in Pishin, Quetta, Gulistan and Dukki (District. Loralai) is just like the language spoken in Kandahar. Those who have settled away from Pishin speak local languages (Pushto), such as Multani or Saraiki in Multan, Hindko in Hazara, Urdu in Bhopal and Sindhi in Sindh. Barakzai, a dialect of Pashto, is the language spoken by Harnai Barakzai.

== Religion ==
The Barakzai are adherents to the Sunni Sufi branch of Islam, following mostly the Hanafi school of Jurispudence and Maturidi school of theology. In the history Sardar Ata Mohammad Khan Barakzai, another brother of Sultan Mohammed Khan Telai, acting as Governor of Kashmir under Shah Shuja Durrani issued coins in honor of the Sufi Saint Nund Rishi and renovated his shrine. Some Barakzai including the Mir Muhammad Jan Khel sub-cadet branch of the Telai (known by the surname Dakik) are following the Hanbali school of jurispudence and Athari school of Theology.

=== Custodianship of the Hazrat Ali Mazar ===
As Sufis the Barakzais are devotees of Muhammad's cousin and son in law Ali ibn Abi Talib, who according to Afghans is buried in Mazar Sharif. The Emirs and Kings acted as custodians of the "Hazrat Ali Mazar". Kings who are buried in the Hazrat Ali Shrine Complex are the following:

- Dost Mohammad Khan
- Wazir Akbar Khan
- Sher Ali Khan

It is because of this emphasis made by the Barakzai that some claim that the Mosque in the Afghan Flag stands for the Hazrat Ali Mazar.

=== Anti-fundamentalism ===
Although many Barakzai were practicing the faith of Islam, and integrating conservative Sharia Law in their legal system, they were known for their anti-fundamentalist policies, regarding fundamentalists as primarily politically motivated, rather than religiously motivated.

== Royal standards ==
=== National flags ===
Flag of Afghanistan before 1901

Flag of Afghanistan after 1901

Flag of Afghanistan during His Majesty King Zahir Shah's Kingdom

Flag of Afghanistan under His Royal Highness Prince Daoud Khan's regime

=== Coat of arms ===
Emblem of the Emirate of Afghanistan

Emblem of the Kingdom of Afghanistan

Emblem of Prince Daoud Khan's regime

=== Private standards ===
Private Standard of His Majesty King Zahir Shah and Sardar Ahmad Shah Khan

Presidential seal of Daoud Khan

== Contemporary role ==
After the fall of the Taliban in the year 2001, negotiations about the reestablishment of the Kingdom of Afghanistan were held, including negotiations about the re-installation of Mohammad Zahir Shah as the king of Afghanistan. However, pressure from the side of Ethnic Tajiks who threatened to revolt against Zahir Shah and pressure from the government of Pakistan on the question of the Durand Line, forced Zahir Shah to renounce his claim to the throne, he accepted the title of Baba-e-Millat (transl. Father of the Nation), which weakened his political role.

Since then Prince Ali of the Seraj cadet branch and Prince Nadir Naeem of the Yahya-Khel of the Telai cadet branch ran for Presidency of Afghanistan in 2009 and 2014.

After the Fall of Kabul in 2021, Prince Raphael Dakik of the Mir Muhammad Jan-Khel of the Telai cadet branch, assessed the reestablishment of the Barakzai dynasty through lobbyist measures conducted by an anti-Taliban lobby group called "Royal Afghan Government in Exile" (RAGE). Next to Swiss politicians, especially from the Swiss People's Party, senior WEF officials and research experts on lobbying, anti-corruption and diplomacy, some of his special envoys are former US congressmen, including Steve Watkins and Curt Weldon.

Envoys of Prince Raphael's lobby group, RAGE, were invited in an ambassador conference in Vaduz, Liechtenstein, which attracted media attention. Although Prince Raphael's private office shares a strong relationship with the princely House of Liechtenstein, RAGE was not accredited as an official government by Liechtenstein's foreign ministry in order to avoid international clashes of interest.

== See also ==
- History of Afghanistan
- History of the Jews in Afghanistan
- Bani Isra'il
- Barakzai
- Mohammadzai
- Yahya Khel
- Amanism
- Shaghasi
- Theories of Pashtun origin
- Pashtunistan
- Pashtunization
- Pakthas
- European influence in Afghanistan
- Anglo-Afghan War
- Loya jirga – "grand jirga", a large congress called to discuss a particularly important event
- Meshrano Jirga – "elders' jirga", the upper house of the Afghan legislature
