= Darzab =

Darzab (Persian: درزاب) may refer to:

- Darzab, Faryab, Afghanistan
- Darzab, Jowzjan, Afghanistan
- Darzab District, Afghanistan
- Darzab, Iran, in Razavi Khorasan Province
- Darzab, alternate name of Deraz Ab, in Razavi Khorasan Province
- Darzab Rural District, in Razavi Khorasan Province
