= Qataghan and Badakhshan Province =

Province of Qataghan and Badakhshan (1921–c. 1945) ولایت قطغن و بدخشان Welāyat-e Qataghan wa Badakhshān
- Province of Afghanistan
- 1921–c. 1945
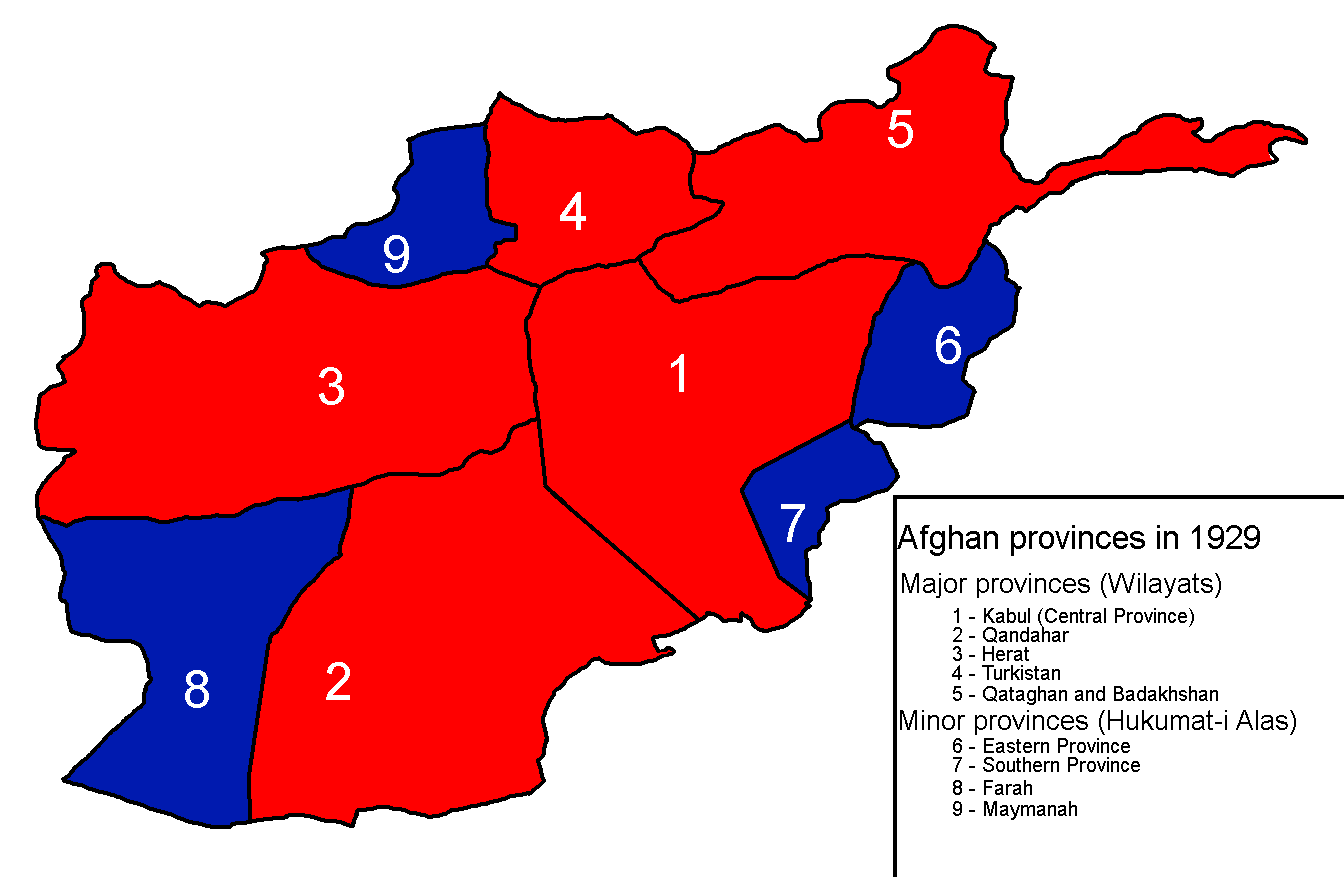
- Qataghan and Badakhshan (#5) in 1929
- Government
  - Type: Province
- History
  - Established: 1921
  - Disestablished: c. 1945
Preceded by	Succeeded by
1921: Province of Turkestan	c. 1945: Province of Badakhshan; c. 1945: Province of Qataghan
- Today part of: Afghanistan

The Province of Qataghan and Badakhshan (Dari: ولایت قطغن و بدخشان) was a province of Afghanistan, located in the northeastern part of the country.

== History ==
In 1890, the district of Badakhshan was formed out of the regions of the former Khanate of Kunduz and Mirdom of Badakhshan which by then were made part of the province of Turkestan. Two years later, Wakhan was incorporated into the district as a dependency. This arrangement proved temporary. By 1905, Badakhshan had been resubordinated to Turkestan, though it continued to function as a distinct "great political division" within the province under its own governor.

Writing in 1906, Angus Hamilton reported that Emir Habibullah Khan was at that time considering a redistribution of the northeastern districts into two new provinces, one centred on Mazar-i-Sharif, comprising Balkh, Akcha, Shibarghan, Andkhui, and Tashkurgan, and the other on Khanabad, taking in all territory eastward to Chitral, including Badakhshan and Wakhan. Each was to be governed by a brother of the Emir. These plans were not carried out, and Badakhshan remained subordinate to Turkestan in the years that followed.

The general region regained its separate status under King Amanullah Khan as part of a broader administrative reorganisation. The regulation on the territorial divisions of Afghanistan (Dari: نظامنامه تقسیمات ملکیه افغانستان, romanized: niẓāmnāmah-i taqsīmāt-i mulkīyah-i Afghānistān), issued in 1300 Solar Hijri (1921/22 Gregorian), formally reconstituted Qataghan and Badakhshan as a single province, comprising two large governorates — Qataghan and Badakhshan — each further subdivided into governorates, sub-districts, and villages. By 1945, the province was dissolved and its territory divided into the two separate provinces of Badakhshan and Qataghan.

== See also ==
- Badakhshan District
