= Sher Ali Khan =

Emir of Afghanistan (r. 1863–66 and 1868–79)

Sher Ali Khan: شېر علي خان; شیر علی خان
- Sardar (Note: Persian: سردار, romanized: Sardār [säɾ.d̪ɑ́ːɾ]); Commander of the Faithful (Note: Arabic: أمير المؤمنين, romanized: ʾAmīr al-Muʾminīn [ʔa.miːr‿ul.muʔ.mi.niːn]); Lion of Ali (Note: Persian: شیر علی, romanized: Shēr-i 'Alī [ʃeː.ɾɪ ʔä.líː]); The Great Emir (Note: Persian: امیر کبیر, romanized: Amīr-i Kabīr [ʔä.miː.ɾɪ kʰä.bíːɾ]); Garden of the Emirate (Note: Persian: گلشن امارت, romanized: Gulshan-i Imārat [gʊl.ʃá.nɪ ʔɪ.mɑː.ɾát̪])
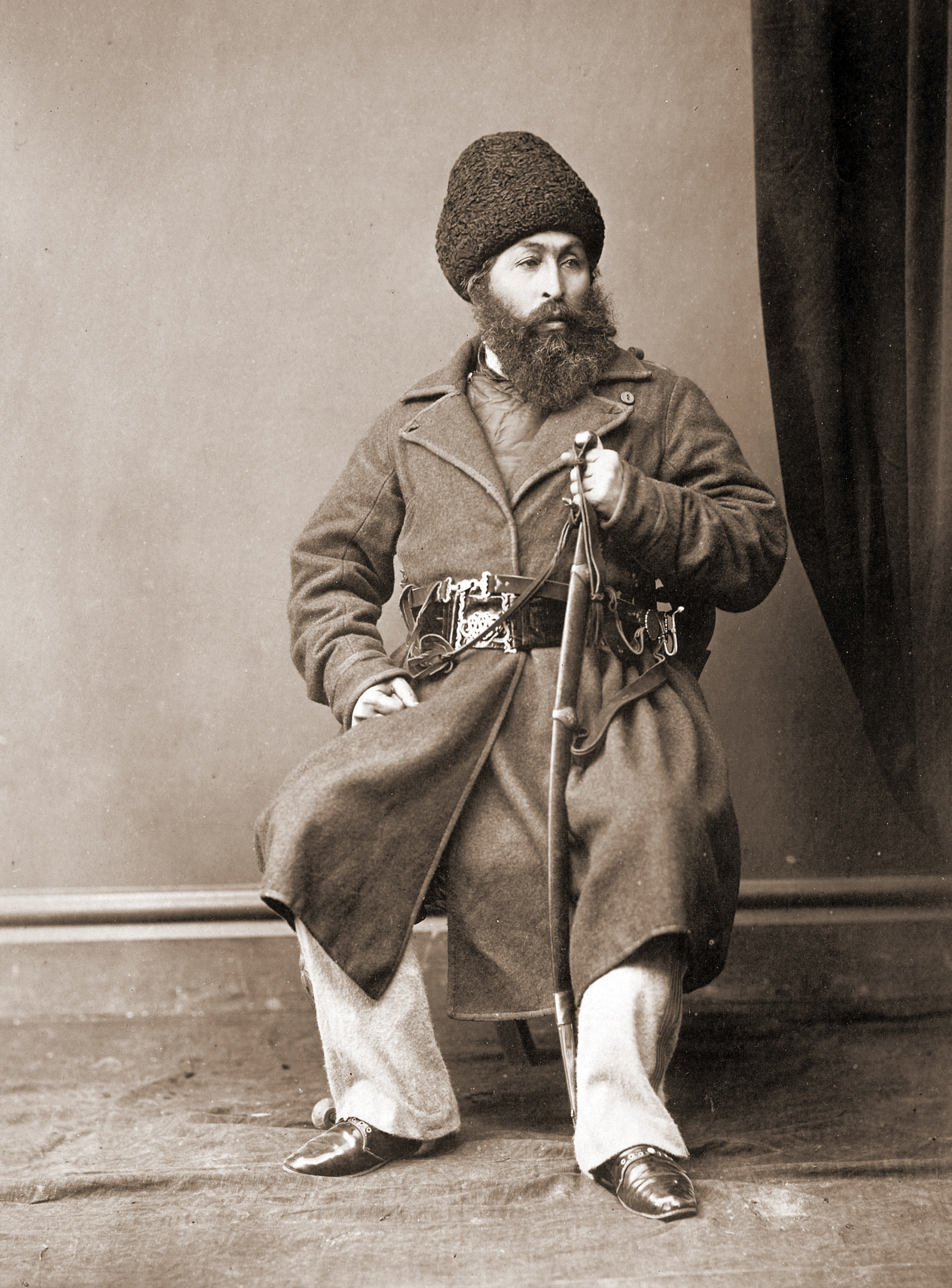
- Amir Sher Ali Khan in 1869, photographed by John Burke

Emir of Afghanistan
- 1st reign: 9 June 1863 – 10 May 1866
- Coronation: 12 June 1863; Great Mosque of Herat, Herat, Emirate of Afghanistan
- Predecessor: Dost Mohammad Khan
- Successor: Mohammad Afzal Khan
- 2nd reign: 8 September 1868 – 21 February 1879
- Predecessor: Mohammad Azam Khan
- Successor: Mohammad Yaqub Khan
- Born: 1825; Kabul, Emirate of Kabul
- Died: 21 February 1879 (aged 53–54); Mazar-e Sharif, Emirate of Afghanistan
- Burial: 21 February 1879; Blue Mosque, Mazar-i-Sharif, Afghanistan
- Spouse: 9 wives: Khurshid Begum Bibi Narinj Maryam Begum Aisha Begum a Nuristani consort a Safi lady a daughter of Mir Afzal Khan Bobo Jan Begum Qamar Jan (daughter of Saadat Khan Mohmand)
- Issue: 6 sons and 6 daughters: Mohammad Ali Khan Mohammad Ibrahim Khan Mohammad Yaqub Khan Mohammad Ayub Khan Abdullah Jan Abdul Rahman Khan Agha Khanum Fatima Begum Sarah Begum Sabira Begum Hajira Begum Maimuna Begum
Names
- Sher Ali Khan Barakzai
- Dynasty: Barakzai dynasty
- Father: Dost Mohammad Khan
- Mother: Bibi Khadija Begum
- Religion: Sunni Islam
- Tughra
- Military career
- Conflicts: Campaigns of Dost Mohammad Khan; Conquest of Kandahar; Afghan Conquest of Kunduz; Herat campaign of 1862–1863; Afghan Civil War (1863–1868); Second Anglo-Afghan War #

Sher Ali Khan Barakzai (Note: Pashto: شېر علي خان, romanized: Šer Ali Xān Bārakzai [ʃeɾ ʔa.li xɑn bɑ.ɾak.zaɪ]; Persian: شیر علی خان, romanized: Shēr Alī Khān Bārakzay [ʃeːɾ ʔä.líː xɑːn bɑː.ɾäk.záj]) (c. 1825 – 21 February 1879) was Emir of Afghanistan after the death of his father Dost Mohammad Khan on 9 June 1863, until his overthrow during the Battle of Sheikhabad on 10 May 1866, and was restored to the throne on 8 September 1868, ruling until his death on 21 February 1879. He was one of the sons of Dost Mohammad Khan.

== Life ==
Sher Ali Khan was born to Dost Mohammad Khan, a Barakzai Pashtun and later founder of the Barakzai dynasty, and to Mermən (or Bibi) Khadija Begum, a Sadozai lady from the Popalzai clan. At the time of his father Emir Dost Mohammad Khan’s death, Sher Ali Khan, was recognised as the heir-apparent. The Emir had appointed him to this position after the earlier heirs-designate— Mohammad Akbar Khan, his full-brother, and Ghulam Haidar Khan—had died in 1847 and 1859, respectively.

In Kakar's book:

"Just before his own death the amir “. . . pulled himself together to don the turban [of rulership] on the head of our hero, the “Lion of 'Ali” after which he was called Amir Sher 'Ali Khan."

He was later ousted by his older half-brother, Mohammad Afzal Khan due to inter-family rivalry driven from a succession crisis, as their father had chosen his younger son to succeed him over his older son, and so the Afghan Civil War followed and ended after Sher Ali Khan defeated his half-brother and regained the title of Emir.

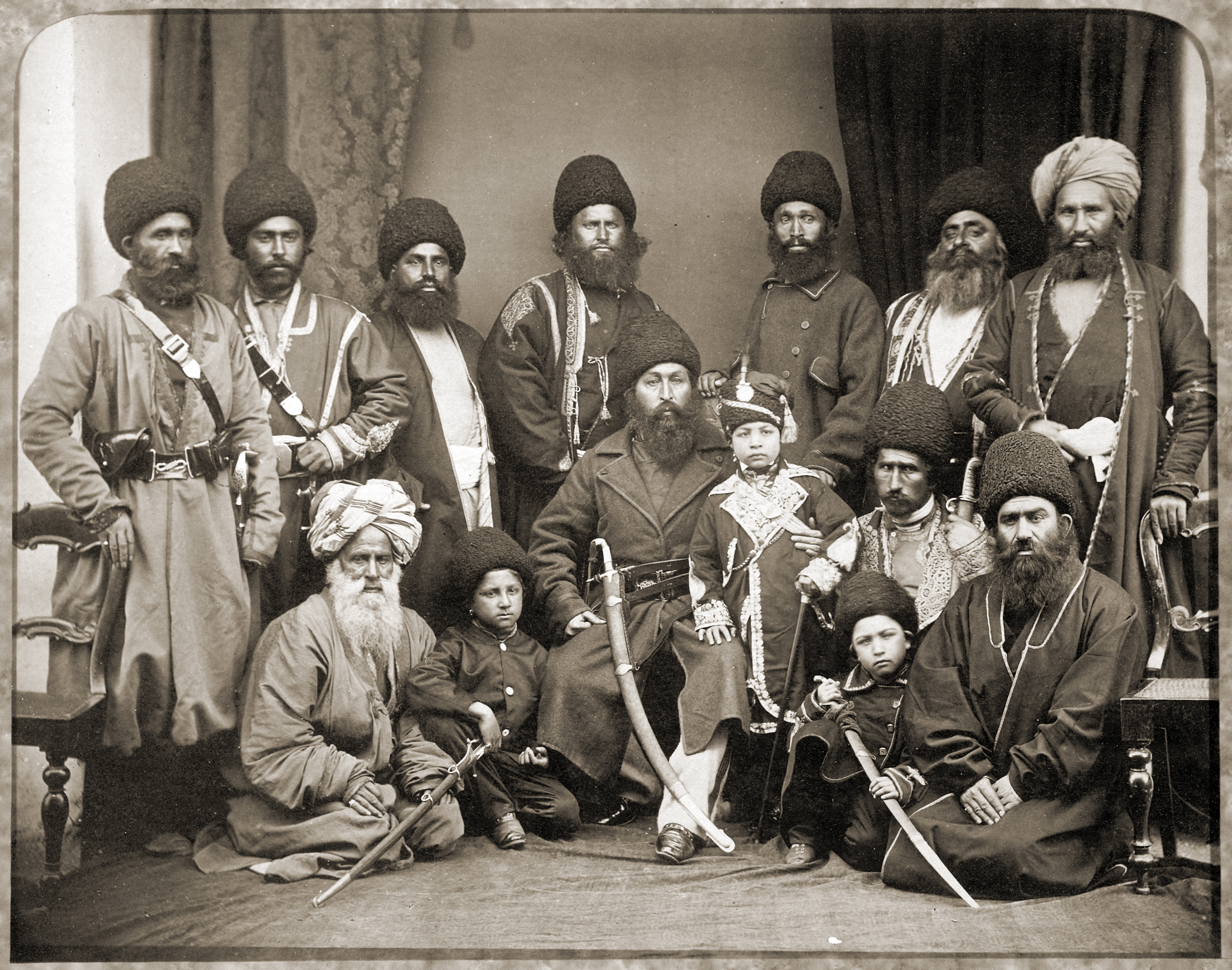
Emir Sher Ali Khan with his young son, Abdullah on his left, at the Ambala Durbar of 1869. Top right is Prime Minister Syed Noor Muhammad Shah and the bearded man sitting on the floor left is Saadat Khan Mohmand, father-in-law to Sher Ali Khan

This inter-family rivalry would play out again towards the end of his reign into another conflict when Emir Sher Ali Khan made his favourite and youngest son, Abdullah heir-apparent at age 7 in 1873, over his adult half-brother, Mohammad Yaqub Khan who helped Sher Ali Khan reclaim the throne from Mohammad Afzal Khan.

Crown prince Abdullah never reached adulthood and died of illness at age 12 in 1878, just a few months before the start of the Second Anglo-Afghan War and one year before the death of his father.

=== Reforms ===
Sher Ali Khan's reign as Emir is often remembered for his attempts at reforming Barakzai rule in Afghanistan. Changes brought during his rule included the creation of government posts, military reform, the introduction of the first postal service in Afghanistan, opening the first school and the first attempts by an Afghan leader at promoting the Pashto language.

Sher Ali Khan tried to limit the power of the Barakzai sardars. He didn't allow his sons to administer provinces and instead appointed governors loyal to him. He also had a council of 12 members to advise him on matters of state. He created various ministerial offices like Prime Minister (Sadr-i Azam/صدر اعظم), minister of finance, minister of the interior, minister of war, minister of foreign affairs, and minister of the treasury.

Under Sher Ali Khan's reign, Afghanistan was divided into 5 provinces: Kabul, Herat, Afghan Turkestan, Kandahar, and Farah. Formerly Farah had been subject to Herat, but instead he made it a separate province and gave it to his cousin, Sardar Mohammad Afzal (not to be confused with Mohammad Afzal Khan).

During his reign, Sher Ali Khan embarked on a project to modernise his armed forces, standardising uniforms and equipment. After being gifted a battery of mountain guns and several howitzers by the British in 1868, Sher Ali realised the potential of breech-loading artillery and was determined to modernise Afghanistan's arsenal. Whilst his early attempts failed, Sher Ali's craftsmen had soon established new workshops at the Bala Hissar Arsenal and began to produce four to five modern breechloaders each month. Despite his successes in producing relatively modern weapons and equipment, poor discipline and a lack of competent officers meant the new cannons were quickly captured by the British during the Second Anglo-Afghan War. British forces captured more than 250 guns from the Afghans during their campaign.

=== Final days and death ===
Sher Ali's rule was hindered by pressure from both the British Empire and the Russian Empire, though he attempted to keep Afghanistan neutral during their conflict. His neutrality resulted in Afghanistan being invaded by the British which started the Second Anglo-Afghan War. This war resulted in a British victory and a devastating loss to Afghanistan as Sher Ali Khan was forced to give away a large amount of territory to British India including the city of Quetta. In 1878, the fragile neutrality fell apart with Sher Ali Khan's resisting of British demands for Afghanistan to accept a permanent envoy in Kabul. The British viewing this as confirmation of Sher Ali Khan's inclination towards Russia, gathered their forces and marched on Kabul. Sher Ali Khan opted to leave Kabul in order to seek political and military aid from the Russian Empire. He died in Mazar-e Sharif trying to reach the Russian border, leaving the throne to his son Mohammad Yaqub Khan.

== See also ==
- Great Game

== Notes ==
Regnal titles
Preceded by Dost Mohammad Khan	Barakzai dynasty Emir of Afghanistan; 9 June 1863 – 1866	Succeeded by Mohammad Afzal Khan
Preceded by Mohammad Azam Khan	Barakzai dynasty Emir of Afghanistan; 7 October 1868 – 21 February 1879	Succeeded by Mohammad Yaqub Khan
