= Takhteh Pol, Afghanistan =

Takhteh Pol
- Location in Afghanistan
- Coordinates: 36°43′41″N 67°1′34″E
- Country: Afghanistan
- Province: Balkh Province
- Time zone: + 4.30

Takhteh Pol (Dari: تخته‌پل), also known as Takhtapul, is a village in Balkh Province in northern Afghanistan. It was created by Afzal Khan (son of Dost Mohammad Khan) as a cantonment after the Afghan conquest of the Balkh Wilayat in 1849-1850. Balkh was in ruins, so with materials from the ruined town of Balkh, he established the city of Takhtapul. Gardens and courts were created as well. Within three years (by 1854) the city was established.

== See also ==
- Balkh Province
