= Mohammad Afzal Khan =

Emir of Afghanistan from 1866 to 1867

Mohammad Afzal Khan محمد افضل خان
- Sardar (Note: Persian: سردار, romanized: Sardār [säɾ.d̪ɑ́ːɾ]); Commander of the Faithful (Note: Arabic: أمير المؤمنين, romanized: ʾAmīr al-Muʾminīn [ʔa.miːr‿ul.muʔ.mi.niːn]); The Just Emir (Note: Persian: امیر عادل, romanized: Amīr-i 'A'dil [ʔä.míː.ɾɪ ʔɑː.d̪ɪ́l])
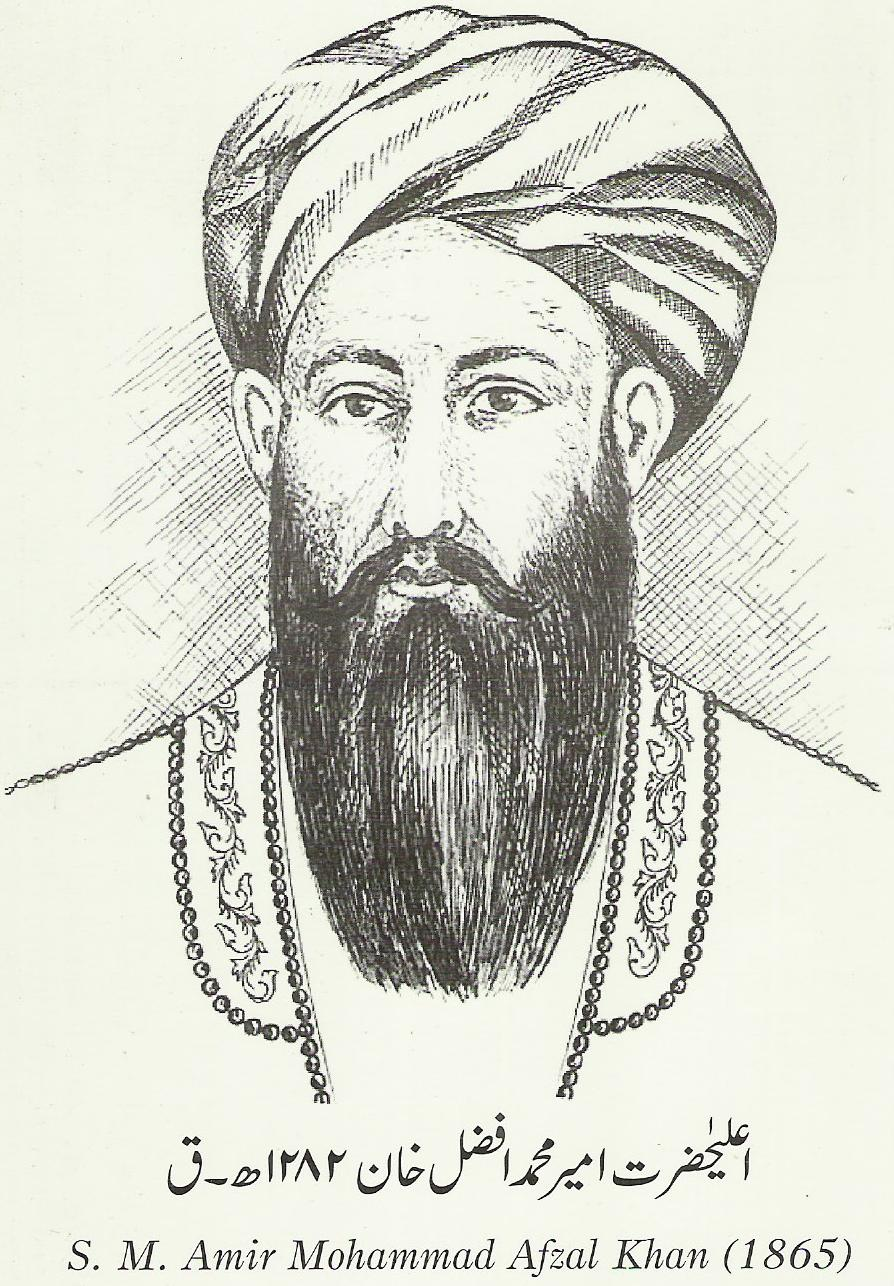
- Sketch work of Mohammad Afzal Khan

Emir of Afghanistan
- Reign: 9 May 1866 – 7 October 1867
- Predecessor: Sher Ali Khan
- Successor: Mohammad Azam Khan
- Born: 1815
- Died: 7 October 1867 (aged 52)
- Spouse: 2 wives: A daughter of Samad Khan Bangash Bibi Murwarid
- Issue: 1 son and 3 daughters: Abdur Rahman Khan Sahib Sultana Begum Bibi Shah Bobo An unknown daughter
- Dynasty: Barakzai dynasty
- Father: Dost Mohammed Khan
- Mother: a daughter of Mullah Sadiq Ali
- Religion: Sunni Islam

Mohammad Afzal Khan Barakzai (Note: Pashto: محمد افضل خان بارکزی, romanized: Muhammad Afzal Xān Bārakzai [mu.wa.mad̪ ʔap.zal xɑn xɑn bɑ.ɾak.zaɪ, mu.ham.mad̪ ʔaf.zal xɑn bɑ.ɾak.zaɪ]; Persian: محمد افضل خان بارکزی, romanized: Mohammad Afzal Khān Bārakzay [mʊ.wäm.mád̪ ʔäf.zál xɑːn bɑː.ɾäk.záj, mo̞.ɦäm.mád̪ ʔäf.zál xɑːn bɑː.ɾäk.záj]) (1815 – 7 October 1867) was the governor of Afghan Turkestan from 1849 to 1863 and was Emir of Afghanistan from May 1866 to October 1867. The oldest son of Dost Mohammad Khan, Afzal Khan was born in Kabul in 1815. His father died on 9 June 1863 followed by a civil war among Dost Mohammad Khan's sons. In May 1866 he seized power from his brother Sher Ali Khan and captured Kabul. A year later he contracted cholera and died on 7 October 1867. Following Afzal Khan's death, Mohammad Azam Khan was proclaimed Amir of Afghanistan. He was an ethnic Pashtun and belonged to the Barakzai tribe.

Mohammad Afzal Khan's third son Abdur Rahman Khan was Emir from 1880 to 1901. Afzal Khan was also responsible for the creation of Takhtapul.

== See also ==
- List of leaders of Afghanistan

== Notes ==
Regnal titles
Preceded by Sher Ali Khan	Emir of Afghanistan; 1865 – 7 October 1867	Succeeded by Mohammad Azam Khan
