= Mohammad Azam Khan =

Emir of Afghanistan from 1867 to 1868

Mohammad Azam Khan محمد عظم خان
- Sardar (Note: Persian: سردار, romanized: Sardār [säɾ.d̪ɑ́ːɾ]); Commander of the Faithful (Note: Arabic: أمير المؤمنين, romanized: ʾAmīr al-Muʾminīn [ʔa.miːr‿ul.muʔ.mi.niːn]); The Celestial-Throned Emir (Note: Persian: امیر گردون‌سریر, romanized: Amīr-i Gardūn-sarīr [ʔä.miː.ɾɪ gäɾ.d̪úːn sä.ɾíːɾ])
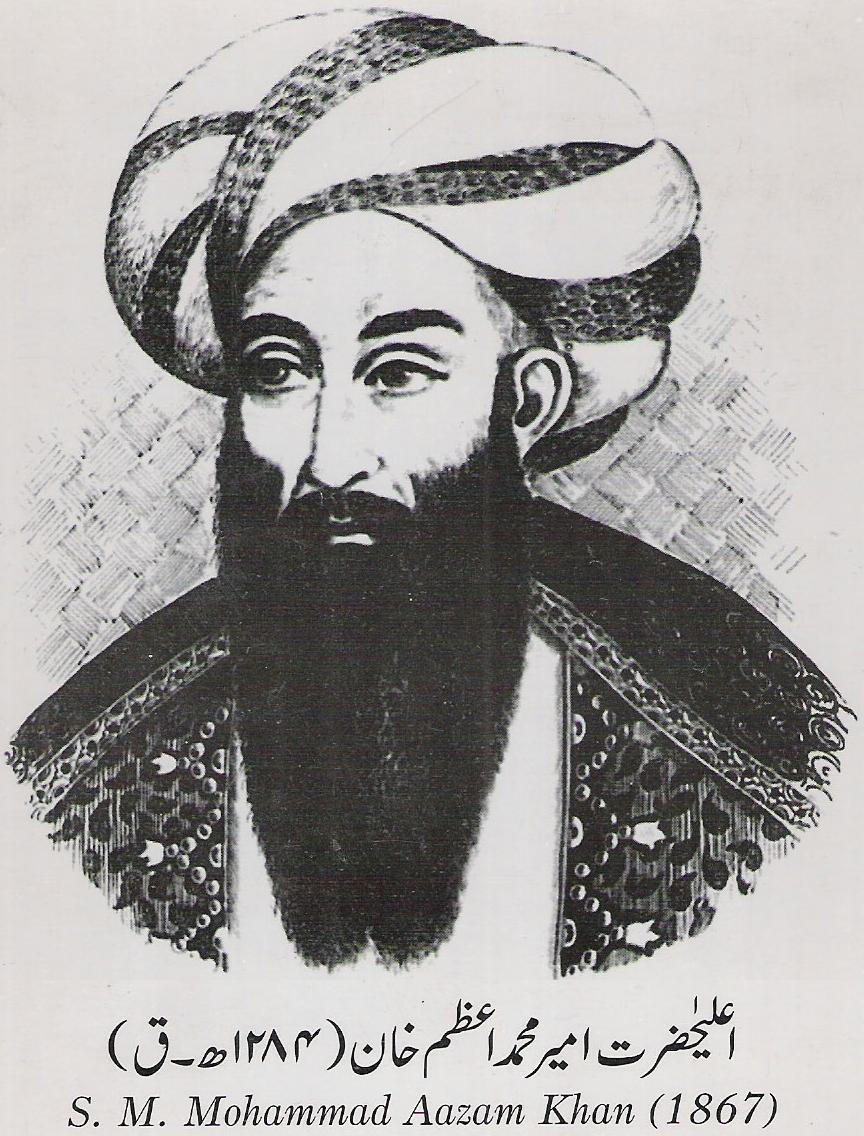
- Image of Mohammad Azam Khan

Emir of Afghanistan
- Reign: 7 October 1867 – 8 September 1868
- Predecessor: Mohammad Afzal Khan
- Successor: Sher Ali Khan
- Born: 1820; Kabul, Durrani Empire
- Died: 12 October 1869 (aged 48–49); Bastam, Qajar Iran
- Burial: Bastam, Iran
- Spouse: 6 wives: A widow of Mohammad Akbar Khan A Ghilji lady A Khosti lady A Zazai lady A Kurrami lady An Armenian Christian lady
- Issue: 6 sons and 2 daughters: Mohammad Hashim Khan Mohammad Aziz Nadir Khan Mohammad Muhsin Khan Mohammad Ishaq Khan Mohammad Sarwar Khan Mohammad Qasim Khan Two unknown daughters
- Dynasty: Barakzai
- Father: Dost Mohammed Khan
- Mother: a daughter of Mullah Sadiq Ali

Mohammad Azam Khan Barakzai (Note: Pashto: محمد اعظم خان بارکزی, romanized: Muhammad A'zam Xān Bārakzai [mu.wa.mad̪ ʔɑ.zam xɑn bɑ.ɾak.zaɪ]; Persian: محمد اعظم خان بارکزی, romanized: Mohammad A'zam Khān Bārakzay [mʊ.wäm.mád̪ ʔɑː.zám xɑːn bɑː.ɾäk.záj, mo̞.ɦäm.mád̪ ʔäʔ.zám xɑːn bɑː.ɾäk.záj]) (1820–1869) was briefly the Emir of Afghanistan from 7 October 1867 to 21 August 1868. He was born in 1820, and was the fifth son of Dost Mohammad Khan. He was an ethnic Pashtun belonging to the Barakzai tribe. Azam Khan succeeded his brother Mohammad Afzal Khan after the latter's death from cholera on 7 October 1867. Sher Ali Khan was reinstated as Emir of Afghanistan and his forces captured Kabul on 21 August 1868. Sher Ali himself entered Kabul on 8 September 1868. Mohammad Azam Khan fled to Sistan and then to Iran, where he died in 1870.

== See also ==
- List of leaders of Afghanistan

== Notes ==
Regnal titles
Preceded by Mohammad Afzal Khan	Barakzai dynasty Emir of Afghanistan; 7 October 1867– 21 February 1868	Succeeded by Sher Ali Khan
