= Afghan conquest of Balkh =

Dost Mohammad's campaign to Balkh

Afghan Conquest of Balkh
- Part of Campaigns of Dost Mohammad Khan
Date	Spring 1849 – January 1850
Location	Balkh Province
Result	Barakzai Afghan victory; Annexation of Balkh, Minglik, Aqcha, and Khulm.; Submission of Sheberghan, Sar-I-Pul, and Andkhui.

Belligerents
Emirate of Kabul	Principality of Khulm; Principality of Sar-i-Pul; Principality of Mazar-i-Sharif; Emirate of Bukhara

Commanders and leaders
Dost Mohammad Khan; Mohammad Akram Khan	Mir Wali; Mahmud Khan; Shuja'al-Din # (Emirate of Bukhara) Ishan Uraq

Strength
3,000 men	Unknown

The Afghan Conquest of Balkh took place from the spring of 1849, to January 1850. Dost Mohammad Khan returned to the throne following the First Anglo-Afghan War, and continued pursuing his ambitions for the complete reunification of Afghanistan following its collapse from the civil war among Timur Shah's sons. Dost Mohammad began had entered the region once again in 1843 after being restored to the throne in the Hazarajat Campaign of 1843, extending his influence to Bamyan and many other regions. Dost Mohammad continued his ambitions into the region especially due to external threats such as Bukhara and the Emirate of Herat.

== Background ==
Dost Mohammad Khan began gathering troops in Bamiyan to prepare for war in Turkestan whilst Yar Mohammad sought to subjugate Maimana. Akram Khan led a sizable force that left Kabul in July 1848 towards Bamiyan. Gifts from many of the different principalities of Northern Afghanistan such as from Khulm, Saighan, Kunduz, and Mazar-I-Sharif came in Kabul that month for the Dost Mohammad Khan in an effort to prevent the attack that Dost Mohammad had planned. The Second Anglo-Sikh War, however, forced the invasion to be delayed.

Chattar Singh promised Dost Mohammad Peshawar in exchange for his assistance of the Sikhs in the conflict in an effort to further Dost Mohammad's cause. Chattar Singh broke on his pledge and instead gave it to two Barakzai sardars, Sultan Mohammad Khan and Pir Muhammad Khan. Despite this, Dost Mohammad dispatched 5,000 soldiers, led by Akram Khan, to fight with the Sikhs. Dost Mohammad made a personal visit to Peshawar and laid claim to Kashmir, a former province of the Durrani Empire. Dost Mohammad additionally encouraged the Qandahar Sardars to launch a campaign unto Sindh. However, the Punjab annexed by the British as announced by Dalhousie, the Governor-General of India, following British victory at the Battle of Gujrat. With this news, the Afghan army evacuated Peshawar and retreated back beyond the Khyber pass as British forces moved into Peshawar. As a result of Afghan assistance to the Sikhs, it was anticipated that the British would react by marching over the Khyber pass and launch another war against the Afghans. However, the predicted invasion never came, allowing Dost Mohammad to return to return his sights unto Turkestan and prepare for campaign there.

== Invasion ==
Following the end of the Second Anglo-Sikh War, Akram Khan was dispatched in the spring of 1849 to Bamyan with a large army, instructed to conquer "Lesser Turkestan". Mir Wali was prompted to take action as a result. He rallied his forces and assaulted an Afghan outpost south of Aybak, driving out its garrison and inflicting 50 casualties on the Afghan forces. Following this, Mir Wali was further supported by many other local rulers of Turkestan, including Mahmud Khan, the ruler of Sar-i-Pul.

Dost Mohammad informed the Mir Wali in letters that Akram Khan wanted to travel to Khulm in late August. If the letter was accepted, it would be the same as annexation to send an Afghan garrison and an Afghan Wakil to Khulm to manage Mir Wali's affairs. To further pressure Mir Wali into accepting this, Akram Khan marched to Khulm with 3,000 troops, six cannons and was also further reinforced with fifty-five camel loads of supplies. These were essential for campaigning, since Balkh during this time was facing a large famine.

At the end of September 1849, Mir Wali responded to Dost Mohammad, rejecting his ultimatum on the grounds that Akram Khan's visit was not "convenient", and had to be postponed. However, Mir Wali's reply is said to have "disgusted" Dost Mohammad. The Mir Wali's refusal to the ultimatum provided Dost Mohammad the justification he needed for war.

Issues plagued Akram Khan's efforts from the very beginning. There were certain prominent Barakzai sardars who opposed the invasion and refused to send soldiers to Balkh. The morale of the Afghan army was also poor due to the armies pay being delayed.

When Akram Khan eventually convinced his men to march out of Bamiyan, he had to deal with more issues. In order to collect money for his campaign, Akram Khan dispatched his forces to the semi-autonomous Hazara tribes in the area of the Saighan and Kahmard. These efforts targeted the wealthy and productive Ajar valley. The locals were reportedly treated harshly by Akram Khan's tax collectors, which resulted in many of them being executed and a revolt spreading across the valley.

After hearing of Akram Khan's tax collector oppressiveness towards the Ajari people, the residents of Saighan fled to the hills to avoid suffering the same fate. It took Akram Khan two to three weeks to re-establish authority over the area, and on one occasion, the Afghans were routed while losing about 80 soldiers.

Ishan Uraq and Mir Wali had enough time to start assembling their forces and putting up effective defences against Akram Khan due to the Ajar revolt and the distraction of Akram Khan. The rulers of lesser Turkestan remained united against Akram Khan even after Shuja'al-Din, the ruler of Mazar-i Sharif, passed away that year's autumn.

When Akram Khan resumed his march north at the end of November, he discovered the sizeable force of Mir Wali and Ishan Uraq well entrenched across his line of advance. This army, led by Ishan Uraq and Mir Wali, had been sent south into the mountains to block the Afghan advance. Akram Khan was prevented from advancing "in a pass" by the Turkestan force's entrenchment and heavy defenses for over nineteen days. Winter also descended in the Hindu Kush early. Akram Khan had two choices: he could battle his way across the Samangan plains or he could wait it out and run the danger of becoming stuck in the snow in the area between Khulm and Kahmard. The only other choice he had was to go back to Bamiyan and stay there through the winter before moving north once more. However, there was a chance of being assaulted by Uzbeks or perhaps the trigger of a Hazara uprising from his brutal taxation policies.

Akram Khan ultimately came to the conclusion that it would be safe to make a face-saving arrangement in the hopes that he could withdraw south and that the troops he had sought from Kabul would arrive in time to start another battle the following spring. It was agreed that Akram Khan would accept the Mir Wali's ownership over Khulm. Other independent states and governors of lesser Turkestan, including Aqcha, Balkh, Mazar-I-Sharif, and Sar-I-Pul, were also acknowledged by Akram Khan.

Dost Mohammad Khan was furious when he learned about the Ajar uprising and the pact that Akram Khan had signed. After the Hazaras were suppressed in the area, he criticised Akram Khan for not withdrawing to Bamiyan and for recognizing the control of Bukhara and Khulm over Balkh. Dost Mohammad's mood did not change as a result of the Barakzai sardars' continued refusal to march in support of Akram Khan and his campaign. Dost Mohammad instructed Akram Khan to "gamble everything" on the campaign in Balkh. Despite the bitter cold and frost, Akram Khan quickly carried out his father's instructions and in a few weeks, successfully captured Khulm. This happened because Mir Wali and Ishan Uraq dissolved their forces after accepting the deal and were completely unprepared when the Afghan army resumed its attack in the north.

By early January 1850, Akram Khan had seized possession of Balkh and installed an Afghan garrison in the city. Following this victory, the rulers of Sheberghan, Sar-I-Pul, and Andkhui submit to the suzerainty of Dost Mohammad Khan. Following the fall of Khulm, Mir Wali was also forced to flee across the Oxus.

== Aftermath ==
Dost Mohammad Khan was pleased with Akram Khan's conquests and his most recent triumphs in Balkh. His attempt to take Balkh paid off, and the British threat to attack the nation faded. This left Dost Mohammad Khan able to continue his campaigns of re-unification. Despite the victory, it became challenging for the Afghans to survive their first winter in the Hindu Kush region. Along with the severe cold, local shortage, and inadequate supply routes to the south, Balkh's remaining residents also refused to sell food to the Afghan troops.

In an attempt to undermine their opponents, the Afghans propagated rumours that Mir Wali had been arrested and was being held captive in Kabul, but in fact, he had escaped over the Oxus. Instead, the Mir Wali had already begun preparing plans for an invasion backed by a Bukharan force. Akram Khan spent the last several weeks of the winter rebuilding forts along the Amu Darya and pleading to Dost Mohammad to send more forces after seeing the dire situation and impending battle that was coming. Moreover, he told his father that he preferred to die than allow any of his brothers to succeed him in managing matters in smaller Turkestan. When spring arrived, a Bukharan army, estimated to number over 100,000, was said to have arrived at Qarqi in preparation for crossing the Amu Darya.

Thus, Dost Mohammad's rule over the north was not yet consolidated, and had to face off with much of Lesser Turkestan's rulers, the threat of Bukharan incursions into his newly acquired territories, and internal rebellions.

== See also ==
- Wazir Akbar Khan
- Shah Shuja Durrani
- First Anglo-Afghan War
- Dost Mohammad's Campaign to Jalalabad (1834)
