= Afghan Turkestan Campaign (1838–39) =

Afghan Turkestan campaign 1838-1839

- Part of Dost Mohammad's campaigns
Date	September 1838 – March 1839
Location	Afghan Turkestan
Result	Afghan victory; Submission and decline of Kunduz
Territorial changes	Annexation of Kahmard and Saighan

Belligerents
Emirate of Kabul	Kunduz Khanate; Emirate of Bukhara

Commanders and leaders
Dost Mohammad Khan; Mohammad Akram Khan; Josiah Harlan	Muhammad Murad Beg (Emirate of Bukhara) Ishan Sudur (Emirate of Bukhara) Ishan Uraq

Strength
4,000 (Initial under Josiah Harlan); 6,000 (At Kahmard)	Unknown

The Afghan Turkestan Campaign of 1838–39 began in the winter of 1838 and ended in March 1839. The campaign was sent as a result of the tyranny of the Kunduz Khanate's ruler, Murad Beg. It was also launched for reasons such as additional revenue gain and tribute from many of the Uzbek states present in the region, including an attempt at subjugating the prominent states of Khulm and Qataghan. Dost Mohammad also feared the rise of Murad Beg and that the Kunduz Khanate was slowly encroaching on Bamiyan.

== Background ==
Following the collapse of the Durrani Empire, many states arose from its decline, including prominently in Afghan Turkestan, the Kunduz Khanate, with its ruler, Murad Beg. Dost Mohammad began fearing that Murad Beg was growing too powerful and that his position threatened Bamiyan, a strategic city on the pathway from Kabul to Balkh. As a result, Dost Mohammad sent his son, Akram Khan and Josiah Harlan, an American adventurer on campaign to weaken Murad Beg and his regime.

== Campaign ==
Thus with the intent of campaigning in Afghan Turkestan, Dost Mohammad dispatched Akram Khan and Josiah Harlan in September 1838. The Afghan army left Kabul and arrived at Bamiyan before leaving it in the last week of October 1838. The Army then reached Saighan, and seized the fort, with its mud walls being reduced from Afghan artillery.

After leaving an Afghan garrison at Saighan, the Afghan forces departed for Kahmard, which formed the boundary between numerous Independent Hazara polities. After staying in Kahmard for 22 days, the Afghan Army departed once again, now further reinforced by over 2,000 Uzbeks and Hazaras. The army continued its march and arrived at Dara-I-Suf, which was ruled by the Uzbek chieftain, Soofey Beg. The Afghans besieged the fort and seized it, capturing many prisoners, while further reinforcing themselves with more Hazaras. After the successful siege, the Afghan force continued and eventually reached Balkh, where the Bukharan governors, Ishan Uraq and Ishan Sudur surrendered without battle.

With the fall of Balkh, and news of the fall of Saighan and Kahmard reaching Murad Beg, he surrendered and signed a treaty. This treaty saw Dost Mohammad further grow influence in Balkh, now able to control the politics of the province. Dost Mohammad also as a result of this treaty, extended his territories as far as Aqcha, and now bordered Badakhshan.

=== Return from Campaign ===
In March 1839, Dost Mohammad recalled the army back to Kabul. However the winter had claimed many men, and by the time the force returned to Kabul, thousands of men had already died from the journey through the Mountains, also abandoning vital equipment, such as artillery, behind.

== Aftermath ==
Not long after, the First Anglo-Afghan War took hold, and Dost Mohammad Khan was in a contest with Shah Shuja Durrani for power. Afghan control over their recent conquests were lost as a result of the war, and Dost Mohammad would not re-enter the region until 1843, in the Hazarajat Campaign of 1843. Afghan control in Balkh would not be restored until a campaign in 1849–1850.

== See also ==
- Shah Shuja Durrani
- Conquest of Kandahar
- Afghan Conquest of Balkh
- Afghan Conquest of Kunduz
- Timur Shah Durrani
- Barakzai Dynasty
