= Ghulam Haidar Khan =

Afghan military general

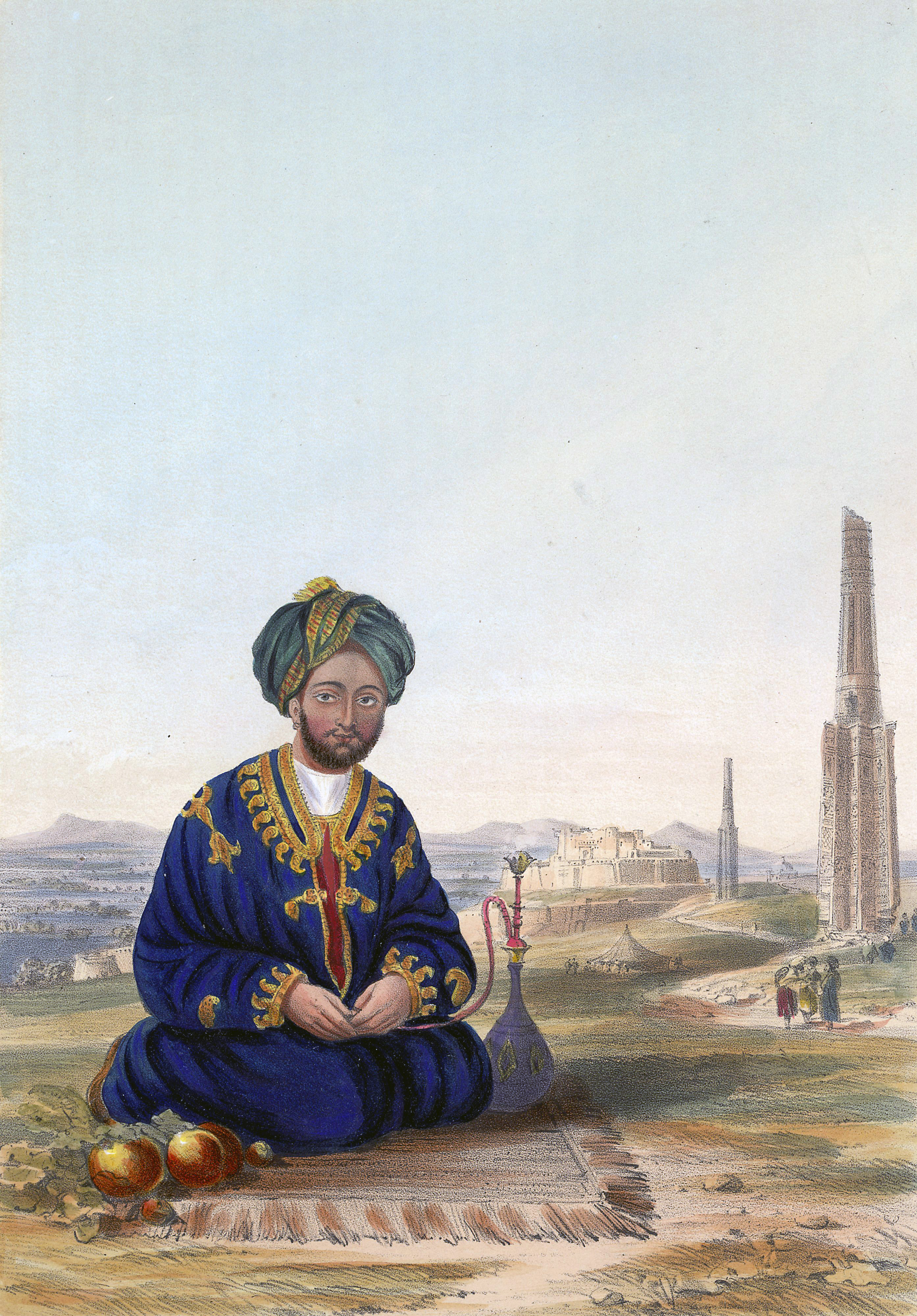
- Portrait of Haidar Khan, c. 1839–1842

Governor of Ghazni
- Born: 1816
- Died: 21 March 1858 (aged 41–42)
- House: Barakzai
- Father: Dost Mohammad Khan
- Military career
- Conflicts: First Anglo-Afghan War; Battle of Ghazni (surrendered); Dost Mohammad Khan's campaigns; Afghan Conquest of Balkh; Conquest of Kandahar

Ghulam Haidar Khan, (Note: Pashto: غلام حیدر خان, romanized: Ğulām Haidar Xān [ɣu.lɑm ʔaɪ.d̪aɾ xɑn, ɣu.lɑm haɪ.d̪aɾ xɑn]; Dari: غلام حیدر خان, romanized: Ghulām Haydar Khān [ɣʊ.lɑ́ːm ʔäj.d̪áɾ xɑːn, ɣʊ.lɑ́ːm häj.d̪áɾ xɑːn]) simply known as Hyder Khan, was an Afghan military general and a Governor of Ghazni under the reign of his father Dost Mohammad Khan.

== Early life ==
Haidar Khan was born to Dost Mohammad Khan, a member of the Mohammadzai branch of the Barakzai Pashtun tribe.

== Rise to power ==
Haidar Khan was appointed as the Governor of Ghazni under the reign of his father, Dost Mohammad Khan. Within the outbreak of the First Anglo-Afghan War, he was caught and was forced to surrender to the British.

In 1850, Ghulam Haidar Khan conquered Tashqurghan and its Mir Wali was forced to flee.

In 1855, Ghulam Haidar Khan was a leading commander in the Conquest of Kandahar.

== Death ==
Haidar Khan died in 1858, aged 41–42.
