= Kahmard =

Kahmard Dari: کهمرد
- Town
- Location in Afghanistan
- Coordinates: 35°20′N 67°30′E
- Country: Afghanistan
- Province: Bamyan Province
- District: Kahmard District
- Time zone: UTC+04:30 (Afghanistan Time)

Kahmard (Dari: کهمرد) is a town in and the capital of Kahmard District in Bamyan Province in northern Afghanistan.

== History ==
Kahmard was conquered from Murad Beg, the Khan of Kunduz, by Dost Mohammad Khan in the Afghan Turkestan Campaign of 1838-39.

== See also ==
- Bamyan Province
