= Robert Sale =

British Army general

Major-General Sir Robert Sale GCB
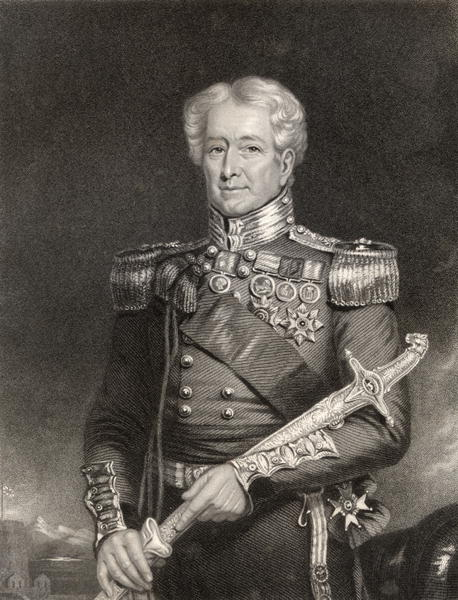
- Born: Robert Henry Sale; 19 September 1782; Vellore, Tamil Nadu, India
- Died: 21 December 1845 (aged 63); Moodkee, Punjab, India
- Spouse: Florentia Sale (1809–1845; his death)
- Military career
- Allegiance: United Kingdom
- Branch: British Army
- Rank: Major-General
- Nickname: Fighting Bob
- Units: 36th Regiment of Foot; 12th Regiment of Foot; 13th Regiment of Foot
- Conflicts: Fourth Anglo-Mysore War; First Anglo-Burmese War; First Anglo-Afghan War; First Anglo-Sikh War

Major-General Sir Robert Henry Sale GCB (19 September 1782 – 21 December 1845) was a British Army officer who commanded the garrison of Jalalabad during the First Afghan War and was killed in action during the First Anglo-Sikh War.

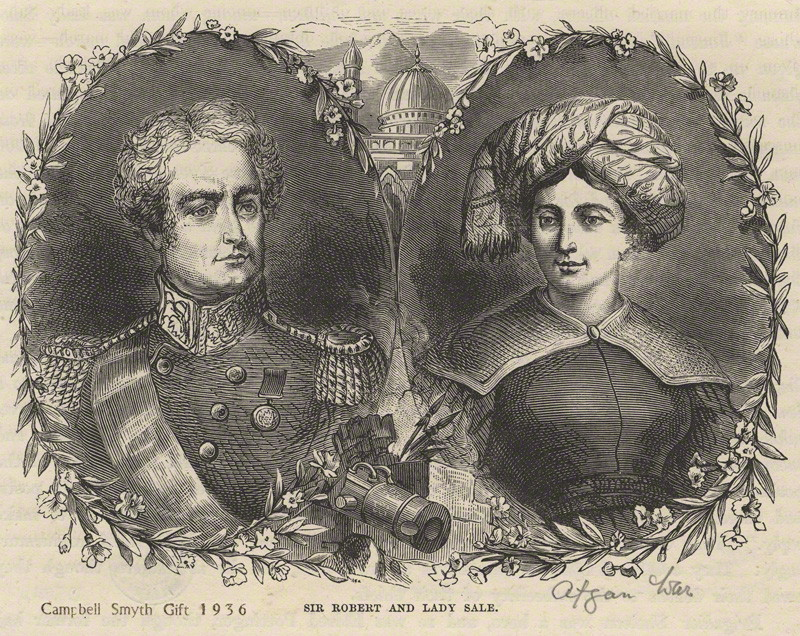
Robert and Florentia Sale.

== Biography ==
He entered the 36th Regiment of Foot in 1795, and went to India in 1798, as a lieutenant of the 12th Foot. His regiment formed part of Baird's brigade of Harris's army operating against Tippoo Sahib, and Sale was present at Malavalli and the Battle of Seringapatam, subsequently serving under Colonel Arthur Wellesley in the campaign against Dhundia. A little later the 12th was employed in the difficult and laborious attack on Paichi Raja. Promoted captain in 1806, Sale was engaged in 1808–1809 against the Raja of Travancore, and was at the two actions of Quilon, the storm of Travancore lines and the battle of Killianore. In 1810 he accompanied the expedition to Mauritius, and in 1813 obtained his majority. After some years he became major in the 13th Regiment of Foot, with which regiment he was associated for the rest of his life.

In the First Burmese War he led the 13th in all the actions up to the capture of Rangoon, in one of which he killed the enemy's leader in single combat. In the concluding operations of the war, being now lieutenant-colonel, he commanded a brigade, and at Malown (1826) he was severely wounded. For these services he was appointed a Commander of the Order of the Bath (CB). In 1838, on the outbreak of the First Anglo-Afghan War, Brevet-Colonel Sale was assigned to the command of the 1st Bengal brigade of the army assembling on the Indus. His column arrived at Kandahar in April 1839, and in May it occupied the Herat plain. The Kandahar force next set out on its march to Kabul, and a month later Ghazni was stormed, Sale in person leading the storming column and distinguishing himself in single combat. The place was well provisioned, and on its supplies the army finished its march to Kabul easily. For his services Sale was made a Knight Commander of the Order of the Bath (KCB) and received the local rank of major-general, as well as the Shah's order of the Durrani Kingdom. He was left, as second-in-command, with the army of occupation, and in the interval between the two wars conducted several small campaigns ending with the action of Parwan, where he was decisively defeated by forces led by Dost Mohammad Khan.

By this time the army had settled down to the quiet life of cantonments, and Lady Sale and her daughter came to Kabul. But the policy of the Indian government in stopping the subsidy to the frontier tribes roused them into hostility, and Sale's brigade received orders to clear the line of communication to Peshawar. After severe fighting Sale entered Jalalabad on 12 November 1841. Ten days previously he had received news of the murder of Sir Alexander Burnes, along with orders to return with all speed to Kabul. These orders he, for various reasons, decided to ignore; suppressing his personal desire to return to protect his wife and family, he gave orders to push on, and on occupying Jalalabad at once set about making the old and half-ruined fortress fit to stand a siege. There followed a close and severe investment rather than a siege, and the garrison's sorties were made usually with the object of obtaining supplies.

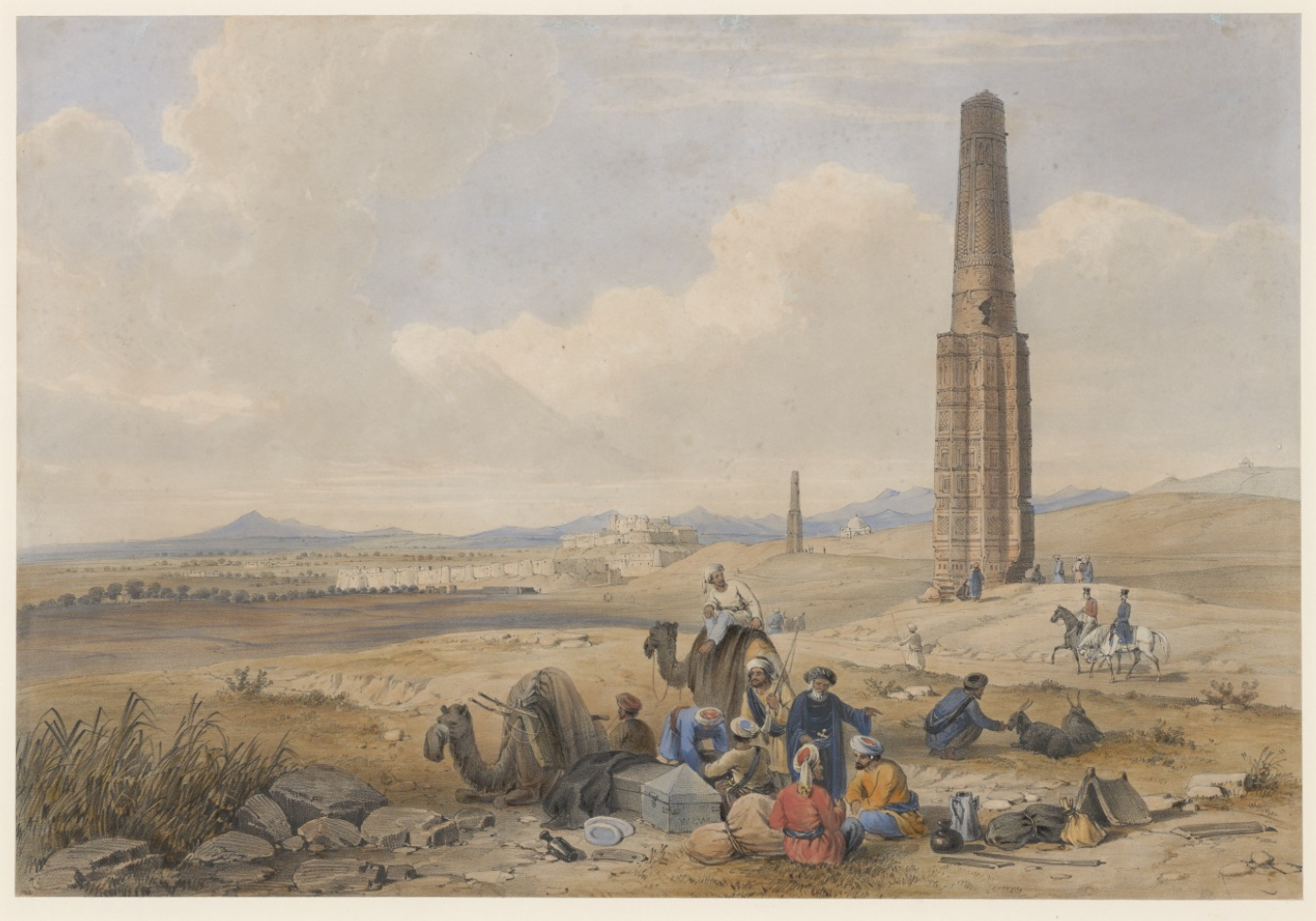
Citadel and Fortress of Ghuznee with its Minarets, a lithograph made from a sketch by Sale

At last General Pollock and the relieving army appeared, only to find that the garrison had on 7 April 1842 relieved itself by a brilliant and completely successful attack on Akbar Khan's lines. His wife, who shared with him the dangers and hardships of the Afghan war, was among Akbar's captives. Lady Sale and her daughter were rescued by the general in person, advancing into hostile territory at the head of a detachment of cavalry. Amongst the few possessions she was able to keep from Afghan plunderers was her diary, published in London in 1843 as A Journal of the Disasters in Afghanistan, 1841–42.

Sir Robert Sale was promoted within the Order of the Bath to Knight Grand Cross (GCB); a medal was struck for all ranks of defenders, and salutes fired at every large cantonment in India. Pollock and Sale after a time took the offensive, and after the victory of Haft Kotal, Sale's division encamped at Kabul again. At the end of the war Sale received the thanks of parliament.

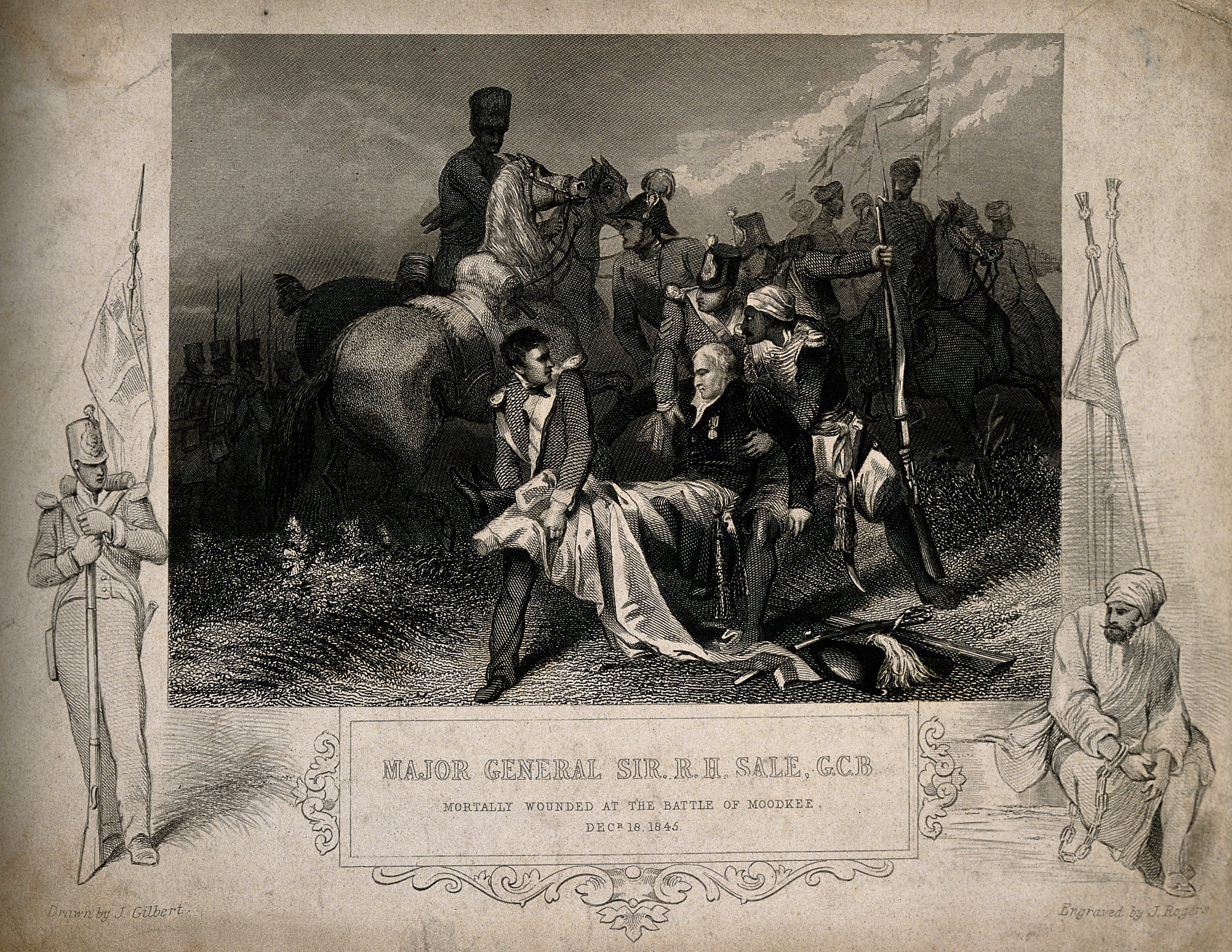
The death of General Sir Robert Sale on the battlefield

In 1845, as quartermaster-general to Sir Hugh Gough's army, Sale again took the field. At Moodkee (Mudki) he was mortally wounded and died on 21 December 1845.

== Personal life ==
Sale married Florentia Wynch; they had three sons and seven daughters.

== Memorials ==
The city of Sale, Victoria, Australia, was named after Sir Robert Sale in 1851.

Two successive public houses in Bolton, Greater Manchester were named after Sir Robert Sale. The second closed in the 1880s.

W. L. Walton was a landscape artist, working in London, who exhibited between 1834 and 1855. He made the lithographic plates for General Sale's Defence of Jalalabad (c. 1845).

== Notes ==
Military offices
Preceded by Edward Morrison	Colonel of the 13th (1st Somersetshire) (Prince Albert's Light Infantry) Regiment of Foot; 1843–1845	Succeeded by Sir William Gomm
