= Sayghan District =

Sayghan سیغان
- District
- Location within Afghanistan
- Coordinates: 35°11′00″N 67°42′29″E
- Country: Afghanistan
- Province: Bamyan
- Capital: Sayghan

Area
  - Total: 1,741 km^{2} (672 sq mi)
- Elevation: 2,000 m (6,600 ft)
- Time zone: GMT+04:30 Kabul

Sayghan District, also spelt Saighan, Seyghan and other variant spellings (Dari: سیغان), and also known as Saraik or Sarayek, and other variant spellings of this name, is an administrative district of Bamyan province, Afghanistan.

== History and geography ==
Saighan was conquered from Murad Beg, the Khan of Kunduz, by Dost Mohammad Khan in the Afghan Turkestan Campaign of 1838-39.

Sayghan District was created in 2005 from part of Kahmard District, and until 2004 was part of Baghlan Province. Sayghan is the largest town and the administrative centre. The district has an area of 1,741 km^{2} (672 sq mi) and as of 2007 contained 62 villages.

Neighbouring districts are Bamyan District to the south, Yakawlang District to the west, Kahmard District to the north, and Shibar District to the east.

It is 1,993 m (6,539 ft) above sea level.

== Climate ==
Sayghan's Köppen climate classification is Dsb, a warm continental climate with dry summers.

== Economics ==
The Da Eman coal deposits are located in Sayghan District, but by 2008 had not yet been fully commercially exploited.

The majority of economic activity is agriculture: farming in the valleys, mostly wheat, potatoes and barley; and stock, raising mostly sheep, donkeys and goats.

== See also ==
- Districts of Afghanistan
