= Tashkurghan =

Tashkurghan, Turkic for stone tower

== Geography ==
- Khulm, formerly known as Tashkurgan or Tash-Kurgan, is a town in northern Afghanistan.
- Tashkurgan Town - official spelling: Taxkorgan, is a Tajik town in western Xinjiang, China. It is also the seat of Taxkorgan Tajik Autonomous County.
