= Parwan Campaign (1840) =

Battle between Afghans and British during First Anglo-Afghan War

- Part of First Anglo-Afghan War
Date	October 2 – November 1840
Location	Parwan Province
Result	Barakzai Afghan victory

Belligerents
Barakzais; Emirate of Kabul; Kohistani Rebels	Durranis; Durrani Kingdom (United Kingdom) British Empire; East India Company

Commanders and leaders
Dost Mohammad Khan; Mohammad Afzal Khan; Mir Masjidi Khan	Timur Mirza Durrani; Robert Sale; Percival Lord †; Fraser (WIA); Edward Connolly †; Ponsonby (WIA)

Strength
400 (at Parwan Darra)	Unknown

Casualties and losses
Light	Heavy, hundreds killed and wounded

The Parwan Campaign took place from October–November 1840, as a result of Dost Mohammad Khan's rebellion against Shah Shuja and the British backed regime. The campaign saw over thirteen battles, with each ending in an Afghan victory, including a final confrontation at Parwan Darra with Robert Sale and Dost Mohammad.

== Background ==
In 1839, the British invaded Afghanistan to restore Shah Shuja Durrani, a former ruler of Durrani descent. The British wished to restore Shah Shuja to the throne as a puppet and to counter-act growing Russian influence in the region. The British successfully invaded and forced Dost Mohammad Khan to flee from Kabul, which prompted in him leading to a growing insurgency with the Mir Wali of Khulm in northern Afghanistan.

Khan found allies elsewhere, where he allied with the leaders of the Kohistan rebellion that had tried to depose him prior. They realized their mistake of opposition toward Dost Mohammad, and now called for his restoration, seeking to support him. They had disagreed with previous actions by the Shah Shuja.

The rebels believed that they did not owe allegiance to Dost Mohammad. Instead, the Sadozais were their allies. And now, having heard of Sale's attack on Jalgah, Mir Masjidi accused Ghulam Khan and the British of perfidy, fully defecting to Dost Mohammad's side alongside a group of pirs.

The British were defeated in 13 different battles and unable to halt the Afghan resistance.

== Battle ==
On 2 November 1840, Dost Mohammad engaged battle at Parwan Darra with Sale. Dost Mohammad held a strong defensive position with over 400 cavalrymen. Dr. Lord, died amongst this fighting that broke out.

== Aftermath ==
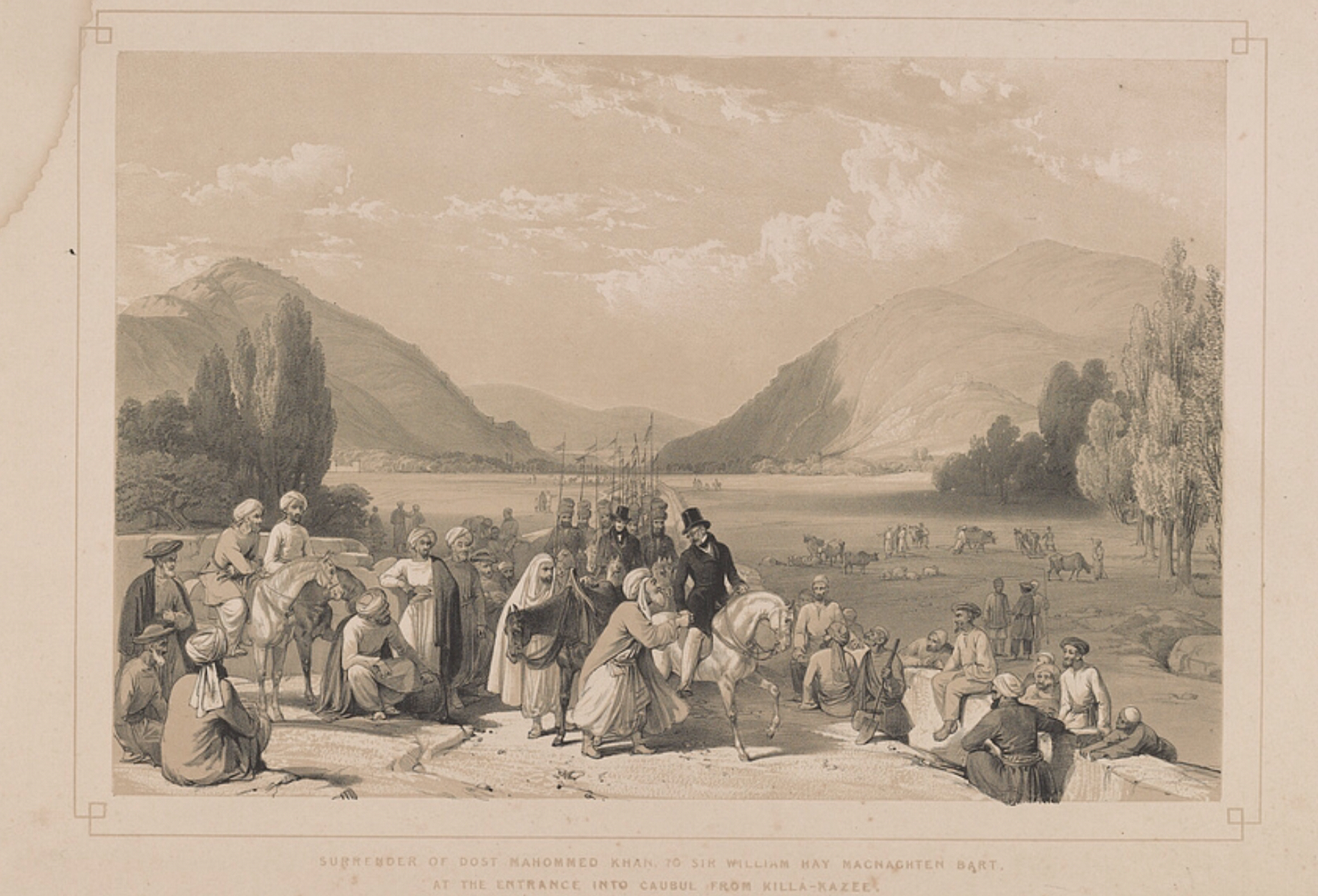
Dost Mohammad Khan's surrender in 1840 following his victory at Parwan Darra.

Sultan Muhammad was followed by Dost Mohammad Khan during 1840.

Despite his victory at the battle of Parwan Darra, Dost Mohammad surrendered due to rising plots of assassination against him by his Kohistani allies. This shocked even the British, with Dost Mohammad Khan perhaps not realizing how close he was to total victory. After his surrender, he would be exiled to British India. However, following his exile, he would return to rule after his son, Wazir Akbar Khan led an active resistance that saw British withdrawal in 1842.

== See also ==
- First Anglo-Afghan War
- Dost Mohammad Khan
- Sher Ali Khan
