= Standoff at the Khyber Pass (1834–1835) =

Battle of Afghan–Sikh War

- Part of the Afghan–Sikh Wars
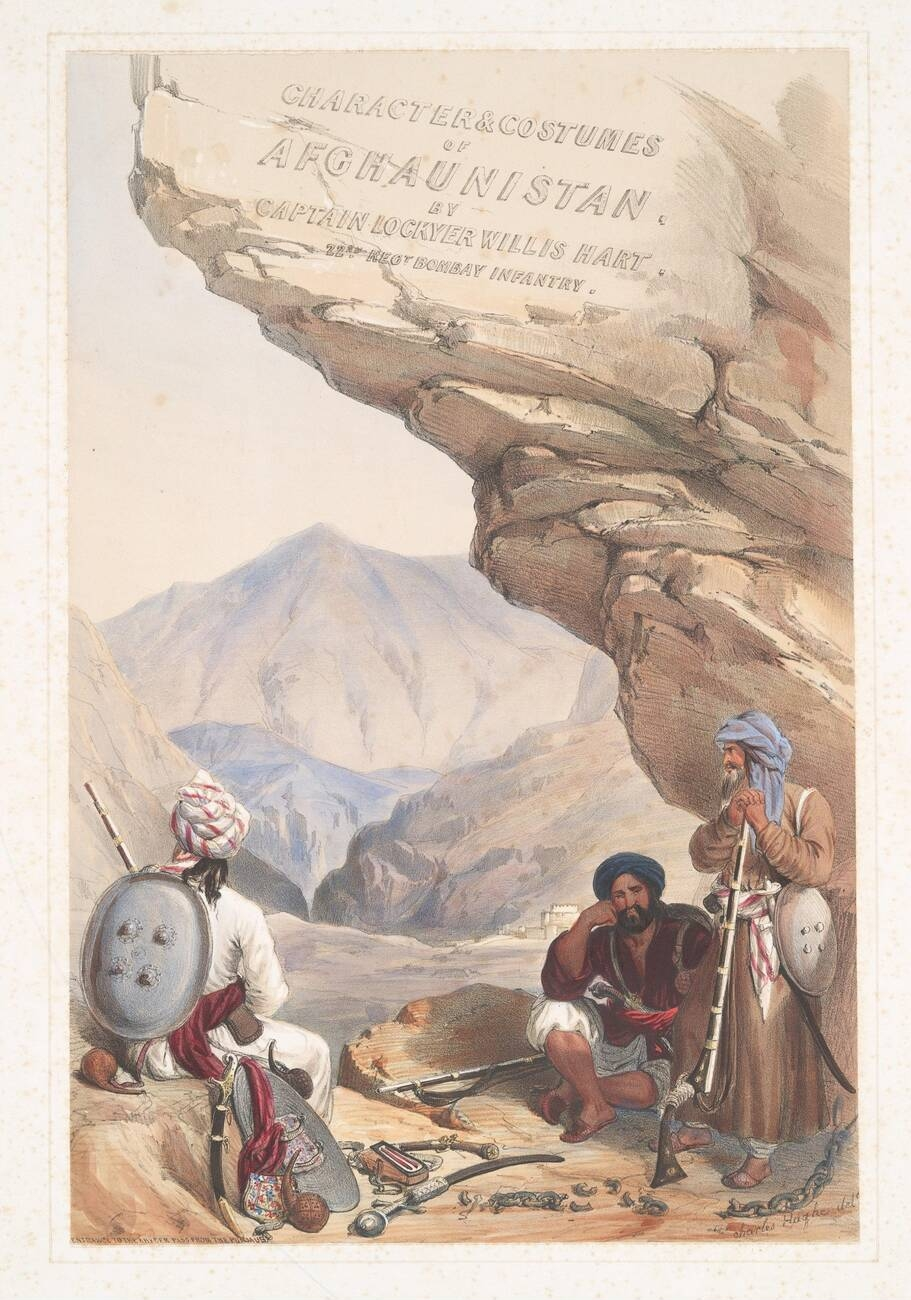
- Painting titled 'Entrance to the Khyber Pass' by James Atkinson, ca.1840s
Date	6 May 1834 – 11 May 1835 (1 year, 5 days)
Location	Khyber Pass
Result	Sikh victory..

Belligerents
Sikh Empire; Peshawar Sardars	Emirate of Kabul

Commanders and leaders
Ranjit Singh; Hari Singh; Gulab Singh; Dhian Singh; Lehna Singh; Tej Singh; Jean Allard; Paolo Avitabile; Josiah Harlan; Jean Ventura; Faqir Azizuddin; Claude Court; Khushal Singh; Attar Singh; Jawala Singh; Misr Raj; Sultan Mohammad Khan (AWOL)	Dost Mohammad Khan; Mohammad Akbar Khan; Abdul Jabbar Khan

Strength
80,000–102,000	100,000–130,000

Casualties and losses
100–200 killed in skirmishes	Unknown

The Standoff at the Khyber Pass (1834–1835) was a short conflict from May 1834 to May 1835 between the Sikh forces led by Maharaja Ranjit Singh and the Afghan forces led by Dost Mohammad Khan and Akbar khan. The conflict began as the Sikh Empire expanded into Peshawar, deposing the Peshawar Sardars, while also supporting the deposed Durrani dynasty in their attempts to return to the throne of Afghanistan under Shah Shuja Durrani.

Following Shah Shuja's defeat at Kandahar, Dost Mohammad began mobilizing for conflict with the Sikhs and met the Sikhs at the Khyber Pass in a standoff. Following treachery and intrigues by the Sikhs, the Afghans withdrew, and no major engagement took place, ending the short conflict with the withdrawal of Afghan forces on 11 May 1835.

== Background ==
In 1834, Ranjit Singh coincided with the deposed Durrani ruler, Shah Shuja Durrani to restore him to the throne with the aid of the British. Ranjit Singh invaded Peshawar, which was ruled by the Peshawar Sardars, and captured it in May 1834. Shah Shuja however, was defeated by Dost Mohammad Khan and the Kandahar Sardars, being forced to withdraw. In the fall of 1834, when Dost Muhammad Khan arrived in Kabul, Sultan Muhammad Khan Telai, his half-brothers, and Hajji Khan Kakar were among the exiles there. They urged him to reclaim Peshawar from the Sikhs. Facing strong pressure, Dost Muhammad reluctantly dispatched Hajji Khan Kakar and the Peshawar sardars to Jalalabad to mobilize the tribes of Nangarhar and the Khyber region.

To further legitimize his cause, Dost Mohammad Khan took the title of Amir al-Mu'minin, meaning "Commander of the faithful", and declared a holy war against the Sikhs, rallying Muslims in the region toward his cause. He began his march toward Peshawar from Jalalabad on 2 January 1835, with large amounts of Muslims coming from various surrounding regions flocking to support the Afghans in their cause.

== Skirmishes and Standoff ==
Ranjit Singh was very well aware of the military preparations being made against him. He had left Lahore in mid-March 1835, traversing a number of cities before ultimately arriving at Attock on 30 April. On 1 May, he successfully crossed the Indus River and entered Naushahra on 2 May. Then, on 4 May, near Ramkani, his troops clashed with approximately 3,000 to 4,000 Barakzai horsemen and Ghazis, who were eventually defeated.

On 6 May, Ranjit Singh reached the vicinity of Peshawar, where he met Sultan Muhammad Khan and authored a letter to Dost Muhammad Khan proposing peace. On the next day, he spotted Dost Muhammad's camp close to the Khyber Pass, where the Afghan chief had gathered a sizable army. Ranjit Singh deployed his forces tactically along the Bara River. According to Hari Ram Gupta, "The strength he possessed was 40 to 50,000 of his own and 60 to 80,000 Ghazis." Ranjit Singh created a camp at Kaikuon and stationed his troops about 6 km from the Khan's camp.

Envoy Fakir Azizuddin and Harlan were sent to negotiate with Dost Muhammad, but relations were tense, and no agreement was signed. Dost Muhammad moved his artillery into the Khyber Pass on 10 May. Meanwhile, the Sikh army, including its French-led division, moved cautiously forward, positioning itself to encircle the Afghan forces.

The French division under Jean-François Allard, Paolo Avitabile, Claude Auguste Court and Jean-Baptiste Ventura commanded 20 to 22,000 men who marched very slowly and suitably towards the left flank of Dost Mohammad Khan's army. The main Sikh army led by Hari Singh Nalwa, Gulab Singh, Misr Sukh Raj, Tej Singh, Attar Singh Sandhanwalia, Khushal Singh, Dhian Singh, Jawala Singh, Lehna Singh Majithia and Maharaja Ranjit Singh numbered 60–80,000 and approached Dost Mohammad Khan's center and right side.

Dost Mohammad Khan rejected a truce with the Sikhs. He withdrew at night with his troops and Ghazis, believing that he was being surrounded and having faced a bad omen with the stirrup of a horse, the Afghans withdrew and took all their ammunition and guns with them, with no battle having been fought.

== Aftermath ==
After this encounter, Maharaja Ranjit Singh returned to Lahore, although disappointed that the campaign had amounted to nothing while spending hundreds of thousands of rupees. On 17 May, lands were granted to Sultan Muhammad Khan and Pir Muhammad Khan, though they were doubtful in their loyalty. Afterwards, Pir Muhammad Khan showed his willingness to sell his territory to the British. On 18 May, Ranjit Singh approved the land grants to be offered to religious leaders in Peshawar. Dost Muhammad Khan was ridiculed regarding his pretension to the title of Amir-ul-Mu'minin and, disappointed, showed a wish to study religion.at end of the standoff Dost khan, and Akbar khan fled to the kabul that why not any big clash and battle happen, after this standoff of Khyber pass were controlled under Sardar Hari singh nalwa General Hari Singh Nalwa blockaded or blocked the Khyber Pass from the Peshawar side Hari singh build the jamurd fort straight in front of khyber pass to there victory. Ranjit Singh, after some rest, came back to Lahore, leaving Hari Singh Nalwa to governor of Peshawar.

== See also ==
- Nihang
- Martyrdom in Sikhism
