= Hazarajat Campaign of 1843–1844 =

Dost Mohammad's campaigns in the Hazarajat 1843

- Part of Dost Mohammad's campaigns
Date	1843–1844
Location	Hazarajat
Result	Barakzai Afghan victory; Re-conquest of Bamiyan and Behsud; Conquest of Dai Zangi and Dai Kundi

Belligerents
Barakzais; Emirate of Kabul	Hazaras: Bamiyan; Behsud; Dai Kundi; Dai Zangi

Commanders and leaders
Dost Mohammad Khan; Mohammad Akram Khan	Local Emirs

The Hazarajat Campaign of 1843–1844 began as a result of the post First Anglo-Afghan War situation in Afghanistan. Behsud and Bamiyan had broken away from Afghan rule as a result of the war, and Dost Mohammad sought to reconquer it following his resumption of power in Kabul. The campaign also brought the Hazara tribes of Dai Zangi and Dai Kundi under Kabul's authority, although its control over them remained intermittent.

== Background ==
=== Behsud before the war ===
Before the First Anglo-Afghan War, Behsud was the only part of the Hazarajat exposed to regular government interference from Kabul, because of its position on the trade route to Bamiyan. Its revenue had been raised from 17,000 rupees under the Sadozai kings to 40,000 rupees in the 1820s, and Bamiyan and Behsud together yielded 80,000 rupees a year by 1837. Mohan Lal's list of the revenues of Kabul gives 69,964 rupees for "Behsud and Bamian". Collection depended on force. According to Josiah Harlan, about a thousand cavalry were sent each year and quartered on the cultivators until the revenue was paid, in livestock, horses, grain, woollen cloth and slaves. In Behsud it was customary to offer the revenue agents sang ya buz, the choice between being pelted with stones and accepting goats in place of the sheep demanded.

=== The war and the Hazaras ===
In the First Anglo-Afghan War, the deposed Durrani ruler Shah Shuja Durrani was restored to the throne in 1839 with the aid of the British. The Hazaras gave Dost Mohammad no support during the war. During his flight towards Bamiyan in 1839, Hazaras stole about twenty of his horses near Gardan Diwar, and in October 1840 he failed to gain any assistance in the Hazarajat. Noelle notes that the risings of 1841–42 against the British were overwhelmingly carried out by Sunni Pashtuns, whereas the Shi'i Qizilbash and Hazaras retained a pro-British stance.

In late August 1842 Lady Sale, taken as a captive from Kabul to Bamiyan by way of Gardan Diwar and the Hajigak pass, recorded that her Afghan escort attacked a party of Hazaras near Gardan Diwar, that two forts there were "Yaghi" (in rebellion) while the rest were subject to Akbar Khan, and that Hazaras posted on the heights near the pass had for some time been besieging the forts in the valley. After the commander of the captives' guard changed sides at Bamiyan in September, two Hazara chiefs tendered their allegiance to Major Eldred Pottinger. Pottinger wrote from Bamiyan that "in consequence of the letters from the Qizalbash, most of the Hazarah chiefs have come in".

=== Return of Dost Mohammad ===
After the British army left Kabul in October 1842, Shah Shuja's son Shahpur, the formal ruler, was forced to flee to Peshawar when the Qizilbash leaders summoned Akbar Khan to the city. Dost Mohammad resumed the government of Kabul in spring 1843. His authority was then confined to Kabul, Jalalabad and Ghazni, and Behsud had become independent. According to Noelle, he was operating from a relatively weak position and did not indulge in reprisals against chiefs who had cooperated with the British. He began to plan the re-conquest of territories that had split as a result of the war such as Bamyan and Behsud, as well as aiming to conquer other Hazara tribes in the region.

== Campaign ==
The campaign began shortly after the failed subjugation attempt of Kunar led by Akbar Khan and Afzal Khan. Mohammad Akram Khan, another son of Dost Mohammad Khan, was assigned a force by Dost Mohammad and he set out in 1843. Akram Khan in a matter of months re-conquered Bamyan and Behsud, and also conquered the Hazara tribes of Dai Kundi and Dai Zangi in the process. When Akram Khan eventually returned to Kabul following the conquest, he brought many gifts for Dost Mohammad including livestock, rugs, and taxes.

Noelle places the re-establishment of control in Behsud and Bamiyan in 1843, as the opening of Dost Mohammad's northward thrust along the route to Balkh, and dates the conquest of Behsud, Dai Zangi, Dai Kundi and Bamiyan to 1843–44.

== Aftermath ==
After the conquest Akbar Khan was made governor of the Hazarajat, which he held together with Jalalabad and Laghman until his death in February 1847. Akram Khan later became governor of the Hazarajat.

Following these conquests, Dost Mohammad Khan was able to expand his realm and later lay claim to territories such as Balkh beyond the Hindu Kush from Bamyan in 1845. The French traveller J. P. Ferrier, who crossed the northern edge of the Hazarajat in July 1845, reported a Kabul army under Akram Khan in front of Bamiyan, at war with the Mir Wali of Khulm. He was told that the chief of the Dai Zangi, Mohamed Saduk Khan, had been assassinated about a month earlier by Bahadoor Beg, who was at war with Mir Muhi Beg of Yakawlang.

Kabul's hold on the Hazarajat remained limited. Noelle describes its control over Dai Kundi and Dai Zangi during Dost Mohammad's second reign as "intermittent at best", and records a rebellion in Behsud and Dai Zangi in 1855–56, while the Amir was occupied with the annexation of Kandahar. She concludes that the Hazaras "successfully continued to ward off any sustained Muhammadzai interference in their central regions", and that revenue was raised only in the Hazara districts bordering the provinces of Kabul, Ghazni and Kandahar.

== Sources ==
- Ferrier, J. P. (1856). Caravan Journeys and Wanderings in Persia, Afghanistan, Turkistan, and Beloochistan. London: John Murray.
- Lal, Mohan (1846). Life of the Amir Dost Mohammed Khan of Kabul. Vol. 1. London: Longman, Brown, Green, and Longmans.
- Lal, Mohan (1846). Life of the Amir Dost Mohammed Khan of Kabul. Vol. 2. London: Longman, Brown, Green, and Longmans.
- Noelle, Christine (1997). State and Tribe in Nineteenth-Century Afghanistan: The Reign of Amir Dost Muhammad Khan (1826–1863). Routledge. ISBN 978-0-7007-0629-7.
- Sale, Florentia (1843). A Journal of the Disasters in Affghanistan, 1841–2. London: John Murray.

== See also ==
- Durrani Empire
- Wazir Akbar Khan
- First Anglo-Afghan War
- Mohammad Afzal Khan
