= Shrine of Khwaja Abdullah =

Sufi funerary compound near Herat, Afghanistan

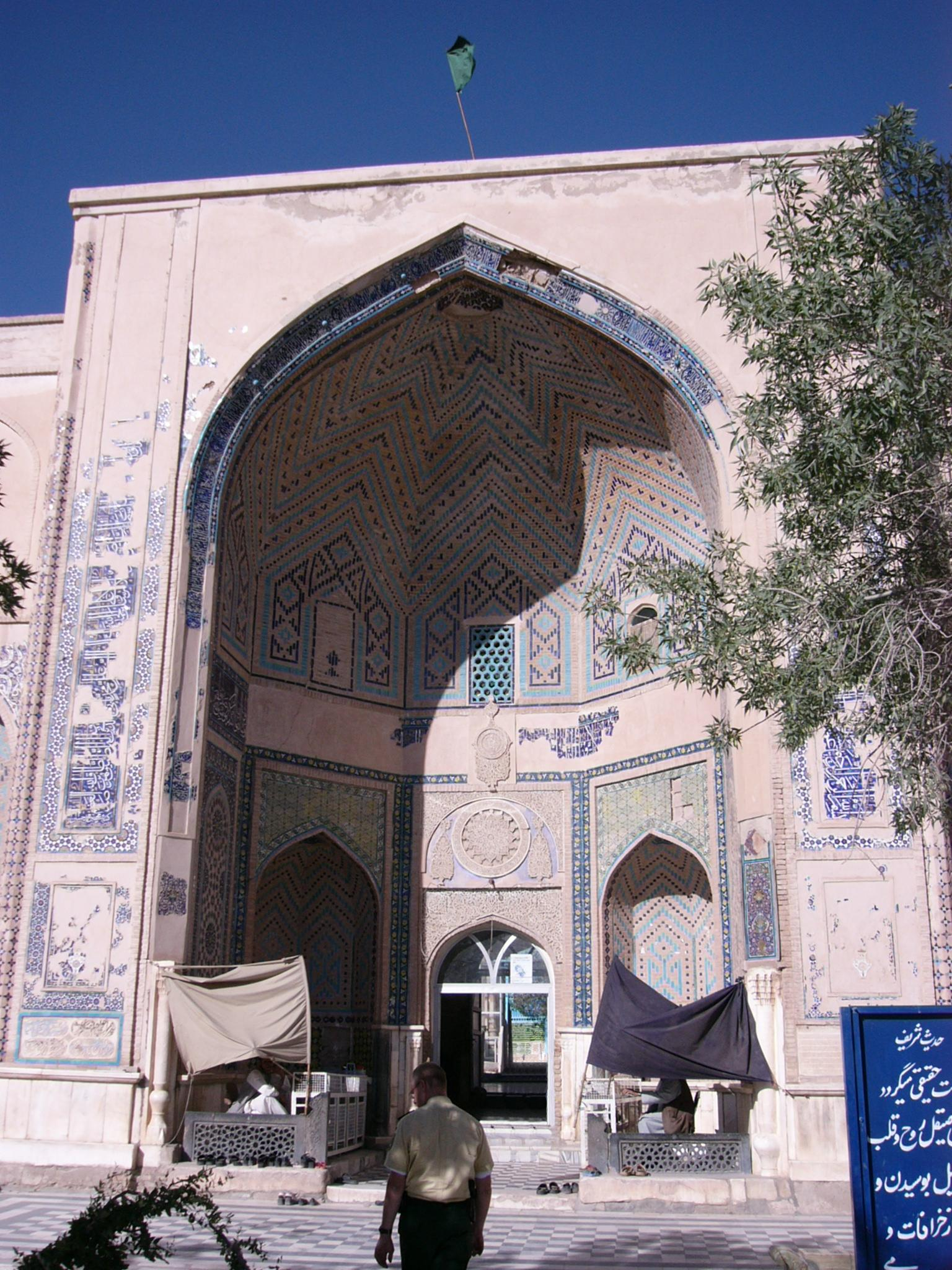
- The primary entrance iwan at the shrine that is semi-domed and five sided. The center wall of the portal possesses a door that leads to a dihliz.

- Location of the shrine in Afghanistan

Religion
- Affiliation: Sunni Islam
- Sect: Sufism
- Ecclesiastical or organizational status: Mausoleum, shrine, and mosque
- Status: Active

Location
- Location: Gazur Gah, Herat, Herat Province
- Country: Afghanistan
- Interactive map of Shrine of Khwaja Abdullah
- Coordinates: 34°22′29″N 62°14′26″E

Architecture
- Architect: Qavam al-din
- Type: Shrine
- Style: Timurid
- Completed: 1425 CE (built); 2005 (restoration)

Specifications
- Dome: One
- Dome dia. (outer): 9.7 m (32 ft)
- Shrine: One: (Khwaja Abdullah Ansari)

The Shrine of Khwaja Abdullah, commonly called the Shrine at Gazur Gah (or just Gazur Gah) and the Abdullah Ansari Shrine Complex, is the funerary compound of the Sufi saint Khwaja Abdullah Ansari. It is located at the village of Gazur Gah, about 3 km (1.9 mi) northeast of Herat, in Afghanistan. The Historic Cities Programme of the Aga Khan Trust for Culture initiated repairs on the complex in 2005.

== Overview ==
The shrine was erected by architect Qavam al-Din of Shiraz in 1425 CE. Patron of this monument was Shah Rukh, ruler of the Timurid dynasty. He commissioned the site as a memorial mausoleum for patron-saint Khwaja Abdullah Ansari. Abdullah Ansari was both a Sufi mystic and patron saint of Herat. The Timurids reigned after the collapse of the Mongol empire in 1335. The Mongols were a central Asian ethnographic group, thus the Timurids artistic styles were influenced by their Asiatic traditions. The mausoleum was built for Abdullah Ansari's resting place and the public wished to be buried beside him because they venerated the patron saint. However, commoners were not meant to be buried at the site, which was only meant for those who held elite status within the Islamic society. The graveyard was one of the richest in the east of Herat, and the tombs of a varied populace were embellished with stones of every color and every size. The tombs were designed for princes, dervishes, state officials, soldiers, poets, and others who held a high status in society. Trees surmount the tomb of Abdullah Ansari and north from it stands a tall marble column and headstone erected in his honor.

The architect Qavam al-Din Shirazi had traveled from his hometown of Shiraz to the northern parts of Iran. Some of his work during this period includes the madrasa for Shah Rukh at Herat, the congregational mosque for Gawhar Shad at Mashhad, and the madrasa Ghiyathiyah at Khargird. By the time he was commissioned by Shah Rukh to build the shrine, he had developed his own architectural style that integrated Iranian, Turanian, and his own personal stylistic elements.

The shrine also includes many notable individuals buried there, including Afghan ruler Dost Mohammad Khan. Dost Mohammad died on 9 June 1863 shortly after his conquest of Herat and was buried there.

== Description ==
Much of the focus of the complex is given to the east iwan, a rectangular interior space with one un-walled side. The facade consists of three entrances from the large polygonal bay, covered in intricate mosaics. Despite the grandeur of the ornamentation, the iwan walls are rough. This is likely due to the rushed nature of construction, which only took around three years despite the fact that decoration itself is usually completed in the same length of time, suggesting that Qavam al-Din designed the ornamentation himself, which was then executed by a team of mosaicists.

=== The Shrine Proper ===
The west-facing entrance facade presents the primary entrance portal. The primary entrance portal is semi-domed and five sided. The center wall of the portal possesses a door that leads to a dihliz, or threshold. The two walls immediately next to the doorway are niched. Three windows above the door and niches allow light into the second floor. The brickwork is glazed turquoise and black in a banai style and laid in a chevron pattern. Two inscriptions have been left on the facade: one by calligrapher Muhyi b. Muhammad b. Husayn dated 1014 CE, and a lengthy vaqf-namah.

An outdoor facade extends down a north and a south facing facade which also possess entrance portals, albeit, smaller and less impressive. The north facing facade leads to a masjid, and the south facing facade leads to the Jamaat Khana. The facade is lit by a window in each of four recesses on each side. A white marble ledge projects from the lower portion of the brickwork. The walls here are vibrantly colored. The banai brickwork style is employed again. The arches are decorated with bisque tiles, mosaic faience. The dado is formed of marble mosaic.

The dihliz appears octagonal due to the painted dado which hides the bottom of the arches. Paintings of trees reach from the dado to the ceiling. Each wall has a door: the north to the masjid, the south to the Jamaat Khana, and the east west to the courtyard. The east facing doorway is pointed and the other three are segmented, but they all appear rectangular due to tympanums. The north, south, and west tympanums are painted according to a calligraphic and floral scheme. Scenes of Madinah, Mecca, and, puzzlingly, palaces, kiosks and trays of food are painted above the arches.

The masjid, or mosque, is divided into five sections by arches. Six alcoves, on either side of the middle three sections, open up to the entrance facade on the west and the courtyard on the east. The north and south sections are in the form of bays, and allow five means of entry between them. A staircase in the south bay leads to an ambulatory. Plaster muqarnas cover the ceiling and alcoves. The dado is composed of buff hexagonal tiles and blue and black mosaic faience, broken up by narrow borders of four pointed stars. The mihrab is a simple inscribed marble slate.

The Jamaat Khana is distinguished from the masjid in only a few ways: it lacks a mihrab and a tiled dado.

The second story is composed of a room and the two galleries that lead to it from the staircase of either of the masjid or the Jamaat Khana. Its windows face over the entrance facade and the courtyard.

The courtyard is enclosed on the north and south by two long facades. The south facade has more damage than the rest of the building. Extensive restoration has made it difficult to predict what it would have looked like when built. However, the southern iwan is similar to the north. It has been very well preserved despite the damage sustained by the rest of the south facade. Due to its bigger size, a relieving arch [link to discharging arch] was built in to support the brickwork. Four rooms extend one by one to complete the facade.

The north facade is similar to the south facade. However, five rooms have been added.

=== The Zarnigar-Khanah and the Namakdan ===
The Zarnigar Khanah is two hundred meters from the shrine. The entrance portal faces north and is covered by two semi-domes. A large dome span of 9.7 m (32 ft) covers the central hall. A niched mihrab is present on the west wall, and the other four walls have a door. A window over each door and the mihrab is framed by squinch arches.

The pavilion, primarily known as the Namakdan, is dodecagonal on its outside and octagonal inside. Four eyvans open the outside of the structure toward four more small octagonal chambers, which further open to the central pavilion. Recently, the vault was split into a first and second story.

== Architecture ==
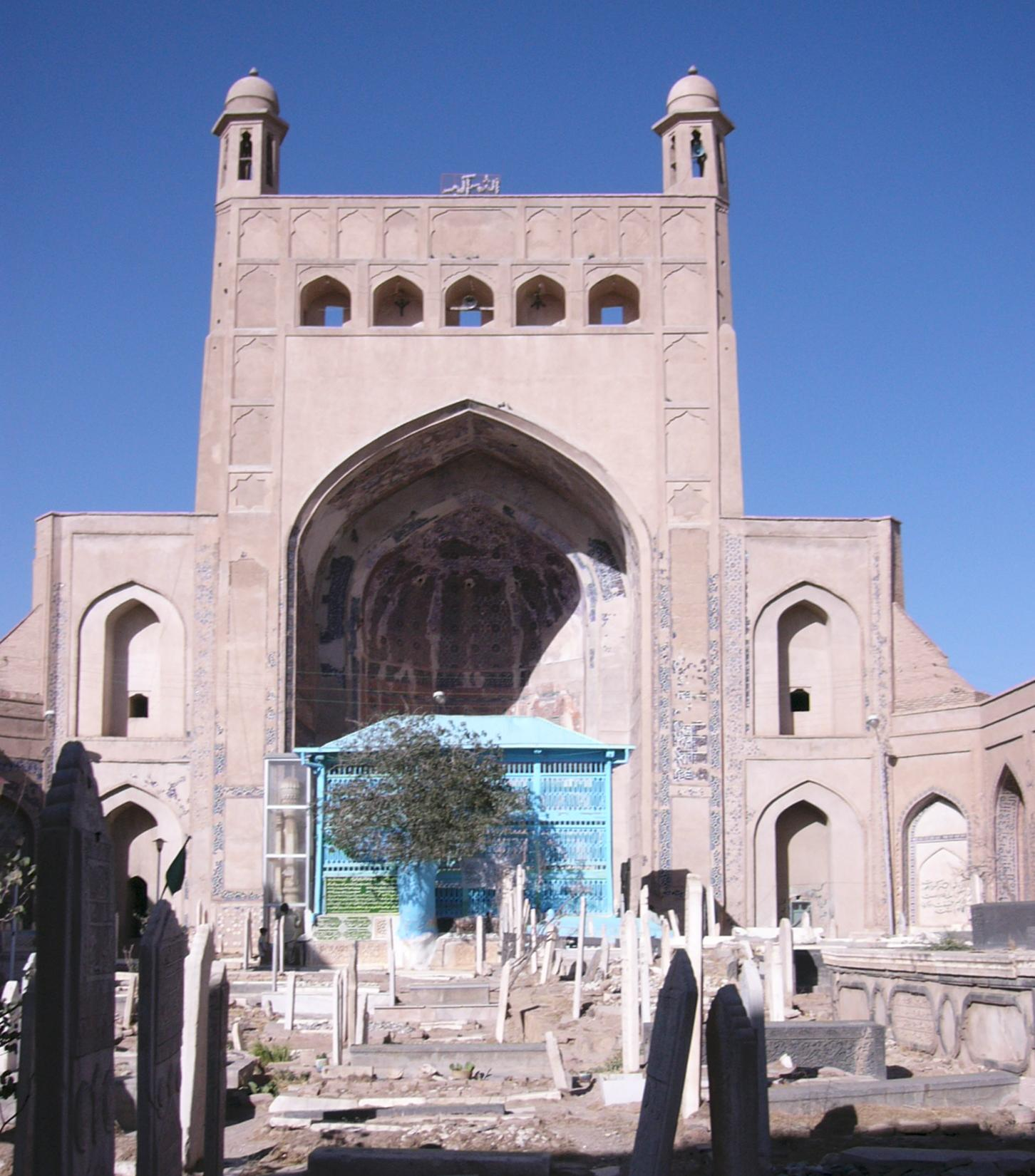
The decoration of the tombstone consists of interlaced vines, repeated geometric designs, and inscriptions. The tombstones and their decorative program are essentially Timurid.

The inscriptions that wrap around the buildings vary in style and are accompanied by gold and lapis lazuli mosaics. Entering the shrine, natural light is minimal. In the center sits a sarcophagus. The sarcophagus itself is made of black marble, as opposed to the white marble used in the decoration of the buildings. This black marble was sourced north of Qandahar, while the white marble likely came from east of Herat. The decoration of the tombstone consists of interlaced vines, repeated geometric designs, and inscriptions. The tombstones and their decorative program are essentially Timurid.

Muqarnas, also described as stalactite composition, are a decorative tool used to give the appearance of a circular architecture in a square room. The muqarnas found in the complex are characteristically conch-like, and dates to pre-Timurid times. The framing used to make the muqarnas here are unique: a semi-dome and two quarter domes. This conch-like maquarna can only be seen a handful of other monuments: the Mausoleum of Baysunghur, the Madrasah of Khargird, the Masjid-i Mawlana, and the Shah-i Zindah.

The mosaic faience can be seen around the shrine on spandrels, inscriptions, and borders. Each spandrel in contains a teardrop medallion framed by a ring of petals. An amber arabesque passes through the ring's center, superimposed on a second, turquoise arabesque. Small blowers bud from each arabesque element and terminates in a palmette. This sequence is common across Timurid architecture and is known as the “tree of life”.

The Banai technique uses the appearance of masonry to design complex patterns in a structure. The Timurids used glazed and bisque tile to simulate brick in this case. The Shrine of Khwaja Ansari used studded brick ends. Glazed tile was pressed with dotted squares and contrasting color in the center. This style was rare, and can be seen in two other Khurasan monuments: the Madrasa of Khargird and the Shrine of Tayabad.

== See also ==
- List of mosques in Afghanistan
- Sufism in Afghanistan
- Tourism in Afghanistan
