= Kahmard District =

Kahmard Dari: کهمرد
- District
- Interactive map of Kahmard
- Location in Afghanistan
- Coordinates: 35°19′09″N 67°38′01″E
- Country: Afghanistan
- Province: Bamyan
- District Capital: Kahmard
- Elevation: 1,475 m (4,839 ft)
- Lowest elevation: 1,475 m (4,839 ft)

Population (2003)
  - Total: 31,042
- Time zone: UTC+04:30 (Afghanistan Time)

Kahmard District (Dari: کهمرد) is a district of Bamyan province in central Afghanistan. The District Capital is Kahmard. It is located at an altitude of 1,475 meters, with a population of 31,042 as of 2003. Kahmard is situated 140 km from Bamiyan city, in the north of the province, and is divided into five valleys (Hajar, Madr, Tangipushta, Ashpusht and DoAb-e-Mekh-I-Zarin).

It was part of Baghlan Province in the past, but in 2005, part of the district was split off to form Sayghan District.

The main river, the Ajar, is an important source of water for the district. Kahmard is considered to be relatively rich. In the past, the district was a hunting ground of the former King Mohammed Zahir Shah. No major destruction of houses, shops, education or health centers took place during the 2001 United States invasion of Afghanistan.

Kahmard has been shaken by rivalries and armed conflicts between Toofan, an ethnic Tajik and former Governor allied to Khalili, and Commander Rahmatullah allied to Mollawi Islamuddin, Governor of Samangan Province.

In mid-June 2002, after fighting between the opposing factions, the district fell to commander Rahmatullah, affiliated with Jamiat and closely involved with the Taliban during the war. Human rights violations have been reported in various parts of the district. On 13 September 2002, Toofan launched an offensive on Kahmard in a bid to take control of the district.

== See also ==
- Ajar Valley Nature Reserve
- NATO
- Provincial Reconstruction Team
- International Security Assistance Force
