= Dost Mohammad's Campaign to Jalalabad (1834) =

Dost Mohammad's campaign to Jalalabad

Dost Mohammad Khan's campaign to Jalalabad
- Part of Dost Mohammad Khan's campaigns
Date	Early 1834
Location	Nangarhar Province
Result	Barakzai Afghan victory; Subjugation of Jalalabad, Bala Bagh, Laghman, and Kunar

Belligerents
Principality of Kabul	Emirs of Jalalabad; Kunar; Mohmand tribe

Commanders and leaders
Dost Mohammad Khan; Mohammad Akbar Khan; Mohammad Akram Khan	Mohammad Zaman Khan; Usman Khan (surrendered); Sayyid Faqir; Sadat Khan Mohmand

Dost Mohammad's Campaign to Jalalabad (1834) took place in Early 1834, prior to the summer invasion of Shah Shuja Durrani in Kandahar. Dost Mohammad Khan wished to raise troops and subjugate the regions around Jalalabad, which was ruled by many different polities, one of the most significant being Mohammad Zaman Khan, who was centred in Jalalabad. This invasion from Dost Mohammad would be opposed by the rulers of Kunar, and the Mohmand tribe.

== Background ==
The Dil brothers, who ruled the Principality of Qandahar, pleaded for aid from Dost Mohammad Khan as fears of Shah Shuja Durrani invading Kandahar and restoring himself to the throne were looming. As a result, Dost Mohammad decided to come to their aid, but took advantage of such by increasing his influence with concessions from the Kandahar Sardars.

Dost Mohammad began preparing to march south to Kandahar and aid his half brothers. However, before doing so, Dost Mohammad aimed to secure a strategic area around Jalalabad to hold of if the Sikh Empire or a detachment of Shah Shuja or his allies were sent. As a result, he fixated on subjugating the region of Jalalabad.

== Campaign ==
Dost Mohammad began the campaign by sending two of his sons, Akbar Khan, and Akram Khan toward Jalalabad. The Army then weakened Zaman Khan's army under the Casus belli of raising for war against Shah Shuja Durrani, the army did this by seizing horses and equipment.

As this was done, Dost Mohammad Khan advanced to Jagdalak, near the Lataband Pass. From there, the governor of Bala Bagh under Zaman Khan, Usman Khan, surrendered to Dost Mohammad and accepted his authority on the condition that his towns would not be attacked.

Following this, Zaman Khan attempted to gain allies such as the Peshawar Sardars, however, they were unable to aid him due to war with the Sikhs. As a result, Zaman Khan only saw aid from Sayyid Faqir of Kunar, and Sa'dat Khan Mohmand. Zaman Khan decided to lay down his arms, believing he was unable to hold Jalalabad against Dost Mohammad.

== Aftermath ==
With this, Dost Mohammad Khan forged important alliances, such as with Sa'dat Khan Mohmand. Dost Mohammad also compensated Zaman Khan a Jagir, that generated revenues as up to 150,000 rupees a year. Dost Mohammad Khan then appointed Amir Muhammad Khan, and later Akbar Khan as the governor of Jalalabad.

The revenues of Jalalabad's province were also raised following Dost Mohammad's subjugation, from 400,000 rupees under Zaman Khan, to 465,000 rupees under Dost Mohamad's rule. Dost Mohammad Khan then dispatched himself toward Kandahar to aid his brothers against Shah Shuja, who was defeated in the Expedition of Shuja ul-Mulk.

== See also ==
- Shah Shuja Durrani
- Expedition of Shuja ul-Mulk
- First Anglo-Afghan War
- Sikh Empire
