= Muhammad Murad Beg =

19th century Khan of Kunduz

Mir Muhammad Murad Beg (Persian: میر محمد مراد بیگ; 1780–1846) was Khan of the Kunduz Khanate in the 19th century. During Murad Beg's reign, he defeated Mir Yar Beg to take control of Badakhshan, and extended his rule north of the Amu Darya into regions like Qurghan Tappa and Kulab. Ahmed Beg was his dewan. He lost a war against Dost Mohammad Khan in the Afghan Turkestan Campaign of 1838-39, which involved Josiah Harlan, ultimately resulting in the decline of his power. Dates on his death are contradictory, ranging from 1838 to 1846.
