= Ajar Valley Nature Reserve =

Protected area in Bamyan Province, Afghanistan

Coordinates: 34°00′N 67°00′E

Ajar Valley Nature Reserve is a protected area in Afghanistan, located in Bamyan Province. It was designated a nature reserve in the early 20th century after the Afghan royal family had used the area for hunting. It is considered by the IUCN to be one of the most important natural areas of Afghanistan and was proposed for a national park in 1981. Poaching is still a problem in the valley and protection has been implicated by war. Especially threatened is the ibex population.
