= Dost Mohammad Khan =

Emir of Afghanistan (r. 1826–39 and 1843–63)

Dost Mohammad Khan دوست محمد خان
- Sardar (Note: Persian: سردار, romanized: Sardār [säɾ.d̪ɑ́ːɾ]); Sipahsalar (Note: Persian: سپهسالار, romanized: Sipahsālār [sɪ.pʰäɦ.sɑː.lɑ́ːɾ]); Commander of the Faithful (Note: Arabic: أمير المؤمنين, romanized: ʾAmīr al-Muʾminīn [ʔa.miːr‿ul.muʔ.mi.niːn]); The Great Emir (Note: Persian: امیر کبیر, romanized: Amīr-i Kabīr [ʔä.miː.ɾɪ́ kʰä.bíːɾ])
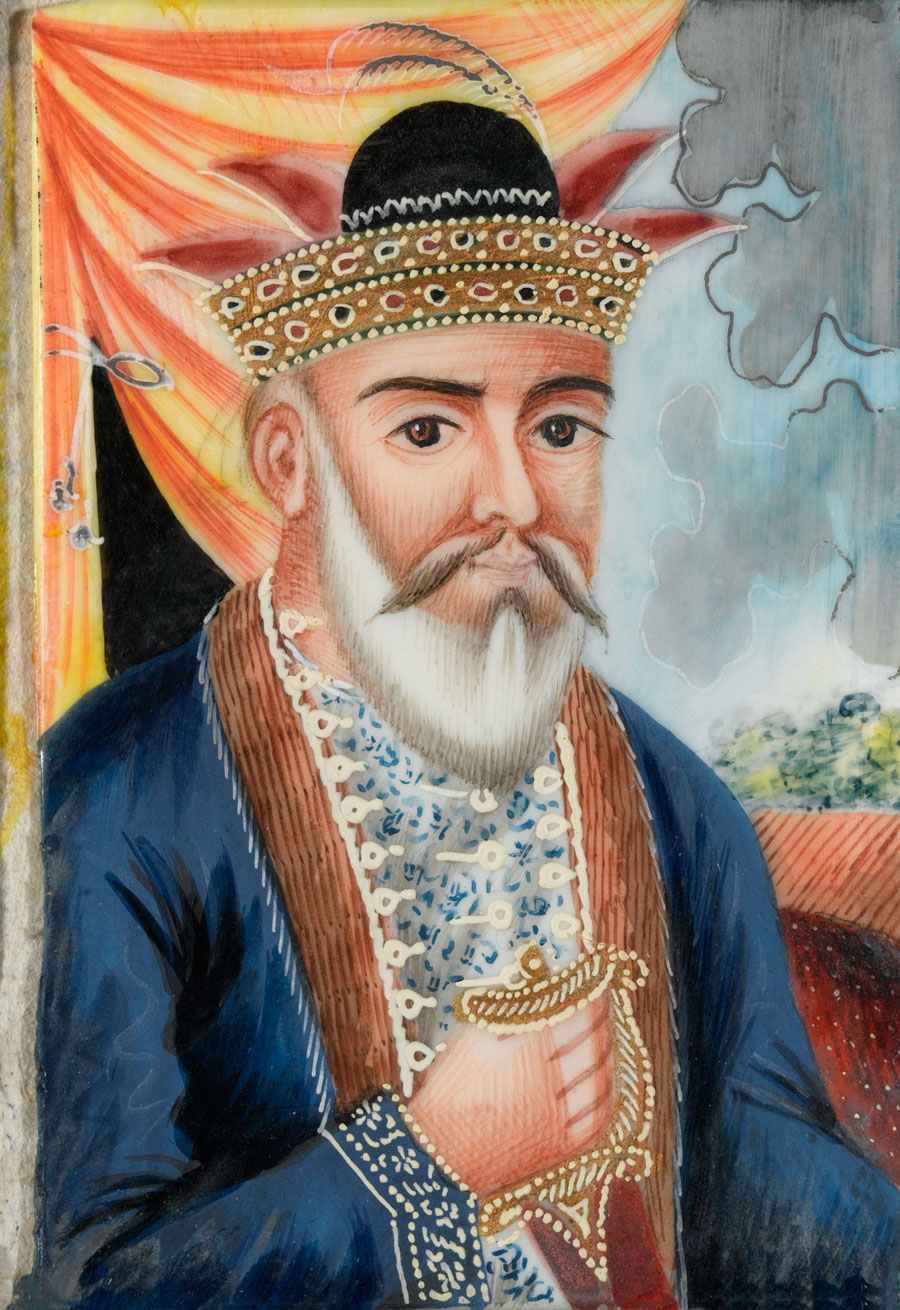
- Miniature portrait of Dost Mohammad Khan c. 1835

Emir of Afghanistan
- Reign: 30 November 1855 – 9 June 1863
- Predecessor: Himself (as Emir of Kabul)
- Successor: Sher Ali Khan

Emir of Kabul
- 2nd reign: April 1843 – 30 November 1855
- Predecessor: Office re-established (Shahpur Shah Durrani as King of the Durrani Empire)
- Successor: Himself (as Emir of Afghanistan)
- Reign: 6 May 1834 – 2 August 1839
- Predecessor: Himself (as Sardar of Kabul)
- Successor: Office abolished (Shuja Shah Durrani as King of the Durrani Empire)

Sardar of Kabul
- Reign: 1826 – 6 May 1834
- Predecessor: Sultan Mohammad Khan
- Successor: Himself (as Emir of Kabul)
- Born: 23 December 1792; Kandahar, Durrani Empire
- Died: 9 June 1863 (aged 70); Herat, Emirate of Afghanistan
- Burial: 9 June 1863; Shrine of Khwaja Abd Allah, Herat, Afghanistan
- Spouse: 25 wives: A sister of Mullah Rashid A daughter of Mullah Sadiq Ali Bangash A daughter of Baqi Khan Kohistani A daughter of Khwaja Khanji Kohistani Khadija Begum A widow of Mohammad Azim Khan Gauhar Begum A granddaughter of Jahangir Khan Turi Shahzadi Agha Taj Samina Begum A sister of Mehtar Musa Zurmati A sister of the Chief of Qalat Bibi Karmi A daughter of the chief of Murad Khani Mahbuba Begum Bamizai A Hazara lady A Ghilji lady A Bajauri lady A Safi lady A Turi lady A Siyah-posh Kafir lady A daughter of Nazir Mehr Ali Khan Qizilbash A sister of Azizullah Khan Jabbarkhel A daughter of Agha Mohammad Khan Qizilbash A second Hazara lady
- Issue: 38 sons and 28 daughters: Mohammad Afzal Khan Mohammad Akbar Khan Mohammad Akram Khan Ghulam Haidar Khan Mohammad Azam Khan Sher Ali Khan Wali Mohammad Khan Mohammad Amin Khan Mohammad Sharif Khan Ahmad Khan Mohammad Mohammad Zaman Khan Mohammad Aslam Khan Saleh Mohammad Khan Mohammad Muhsin Khan Mohammad Hasan Khan Mohammad Karim Khan Mohammad Husain Khan Faiz Mohammad Khan Mohammad Tuman Khan Mohammad Umar Khan Saifullah Khan Mohammad Yusuf Khan Mohammad Qasim Khan Mohammad Hashim Khan Sher Mohammad Khan Mohammad Sadiq Khan I Mohammad Sadiq Khan II Habibullah Khan Mohammad Rahim Khan I Nek Mohammad Khan Mohammad Sadiq Khan III Mohammad Shuaib Khan Saleh Mohammad Khan Mohammad Muhsin Khan Mohammad Azim Khan Mohammad Rahim Khan II Khair Mohammad Khan Saleh Mohammad Khan Shams-i Jahan Begum Padshah Begum Hawa Khanum Hajira Khanum Two unknown daughters Bibi Zamarud Khanum Ummat ul-Mustafa Khanum Nur-i Jahan Khanum Durrani Khanum Shah-i Jahan Khanum Wafa Begum Sarw-i Jahan Khanum Mumlekat Khanum Sharaf Sultan Khanum Dur-i Jahan Khanum Sahib Sultan Khanum Sahira Begum Aisha Khanum Bilqis Khanum Agha Begum Fatima Begum Zainab Khanum Shahar Banu Khanum Jahan-i Sultan Khanum Mulk-i Jahan Khanum Badr-i Jahan Begum Bibi Kohat
- Dynasty: Barakzai dynasty
- Father: Payandah Khan
- Mother: Zainab Begum
- Religion: Sunni Islam
- Military career
- Conflicts: Afghan Civil War (1793–1823); Battle of Nimla (1809); Herat Campaign (1818); Afghan-Sikh Wars; Battle of Attock (1813); Battle of Nowshera; Standoff at the Khyber Pass (1834–1835); Expedition of Shuja ul-Mulk; Dost Mohammad Khan's First Campaign; Dost Mohammad's Campaign to Jalalabad (1834); Afghan Turkestan Campaign of 1838-39; First Anglo-Afghan War; Parwan Campaign (1840); Dost Mohammad Khan's Second Campaign; Hazarajat Campaign of 1843; Afghan Conquest of Balkh; Conquest of Kandahar; Afghan Conquest of Kunduz; Herat campaign of 1862–1863

Dost Mohammad Khan Barakzai, (Note: Pashto: دوست محمد خان بارکزی, romanized: Dost Muhammad Xān Bārakzai, [d̪ost̪ mu.wa.mad/mu.ham.mad xɑn bɑ.ɾak.zaɪ]; Persian: دوست محمد خان بارکزی, romanized: Dost Muhammad Khān Bārakzay, [d̪oːst̪ mʊ.wäm.mád̪/mo̞.ɦäm.mád̪ xɑːn bɑː.ɾäk.záj]) (23 December 1792 – 9 June 1863) nicknamed the Great Emir, was the founder of the Barakzai dynasty and one of the prominent rulers of Afghanistan during the First Anglo-Afghan War. With the decline of the Durrani dynasty, he succeeded his brother Sultan Mohammad Khan, and became the Emir of Afghanistan in 1826. An ethnic Pashtun, he belonged to the Mohammadzai branch of the Barakzai tribe. He was the 11th son of Payandah Khan, chief of the Barakzai Pashtuns, who was killed in 1800 by King Zaman Shah Durrani.

At the beginning of his rule, the Afghans lost their former stronghold of Peshawar Valley in March 1823 to the Sikh Khalsa Army of Ranjit Singh at the Battle of Nowshera. The Afghan forces in the battle were led by Mohammad Azim Khan, half-brother of Dost Mohammad Khan. By the end of his reign, he had reunited the principalities of Kandahar and Herat with Kabul. Dost had ruled for a lengthy 36 years, a span exceeded only by Mohammad Zahir Shah more than a century later.

Dost Mohammad is regarded as one of the most prominent rulers in the history of Afghanistan. A skilled military commander and strategist, he successfully unified the regions of Kabul, Kandahar, and Herat into a single state - a feat that few of his predecessors, with the exception of Ahmad Shah Durrani and Timur Shah Durrani, had accomplished.

== Background and rise to power ==
Dost Mohammad Khan was born to an influential Pashtun family on 23 December 1792 in Kandahar, Durrani Empire. His father, Payandah Khan, was chief of the Barakzai tribe and a civil servant in the Durrani dynasty. Their family could be traced back to Abdal (the founder of the Abdali tribe), through Hajji Jamal Khan, Yousef, Yaru, Mohammad, Omar Khan, Khisar Khan, Ismail, Nek, Daru, Saifal, and Barak. Abdal had four sons, Popal, Barak, Achak and Alako. Dost Mohammad Khan's mother belonged to the Qizilbash group. Dost Mohammad Khan spoke Pashto, Persian, Punjabi and Turkish. He was also credited with knowledge of Kashmiri by Mohan Lal.

His elder brother, the chief of the Barakzai, Fateh Khan, took an important part in installing Mahmud Shah Durrani as the sovereign of Afghanistan in 1800 and in restoring him to the throne in 1809. Dost Mohammad accompanied his elder brother and then Prime Minister of Kabul Wazir Fateh Khan to the Battle of Attock against the invading Sikhs. Mahmud Shah repaid Fateh Khan's services by having him brutally assassinated in 1818, thus incurring the enmity of his tribe. After a bloody conflict, Mahmud Shah was deprived of all his possessions but Herat, the rest of his dominions being divided among Fateh Khan's brothers. Of these, Dost Mohammad received Ghazni, to which in 1826 he added Kabul, the richest of the Afghan provinces. At the time of his enthronement, his government revenue was about 500,000 rupees, and by the 1830s it had increased to 2.5 million rupees.

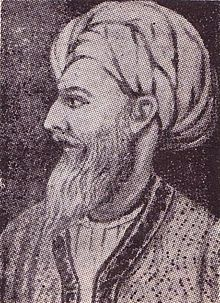
Portrait of Payendah Khan Barakzai father of Emir Dost Mohammad Khan

From the commencement of his reign he found himself involved in disputes with Ranjit Singh, the Sikh ruler of the Punjab region, who used the dethroned Sadozai prince, Shah Shujah Durrani, as his instrument. In 1834, Shah Shujah made an attempt to recover his kingdom. Dost Mohammad Khan mobilized for this, beginning initially with the Jalalabad campaign, and then marching on Kandahar, where Shah Shuja was defeated by Dost Mohammad Khan under the walls of Kandahar, but Ranjit Singh seized the opportunity to annex Peshawar which was ruled by the Peshawar Sardars under his deposed brother, Sultan Mohammad Khan. Dost Mohammad sent his son Akbar Khan to defeat the Sikhs at the Battle of Jamrud in 1837.

== European influence in Afghanistan ==
At the intersection of British, Russian and, to a lesser degree, French imperial interests, political maneuvering was necessary. Rejecting overtures from Russia, he endeavoured to form an alliance with Great Britain, and welcomed Alexander Burnes to Kabul in 1837. Burnes, however, was unable to prevail on the governor-general, Lord Auckland, to respond to the Emir's advances. Dost Mohammad was enjoined to abandon the attempt to recover Peshawar, and to place his foreign policy under British guidance. He replied by renewing his relations with Russia, and in 1838 Lord Auckland set the British troops in motion against him. To enable such an action, the British manufactured the evidence needed to justify the overthrow of the Afghan ruler.

== War with the Sikhs ==
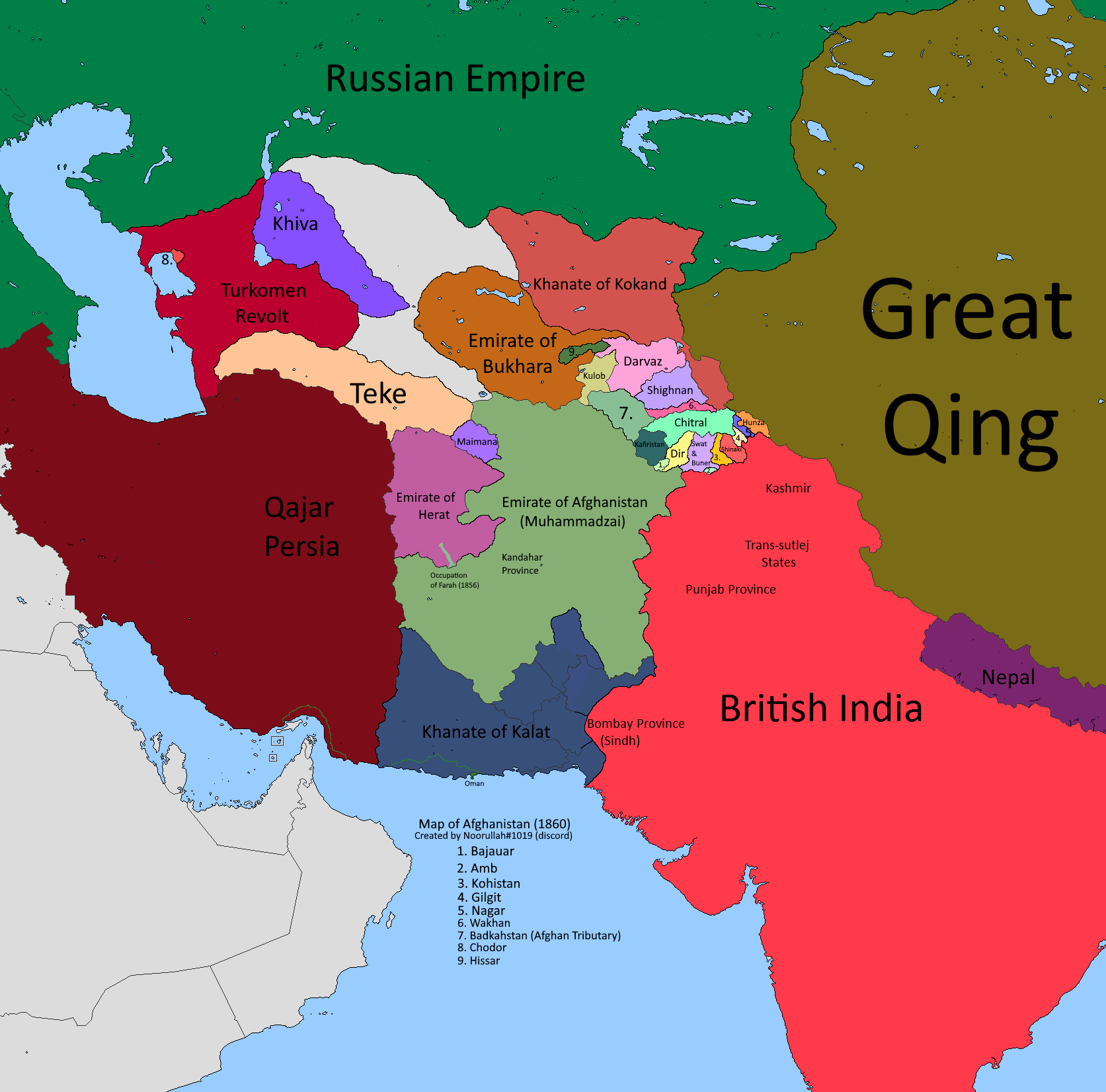
Map of Afghanistan and surrounding nations, dated 1860.

In 1835, Dost Mohammad Khan, the youngest and the most energetic of the Barakzai brothers, who had supplanted the Durrani dynasty and become Emir (lord, chief or king) of Kabul in 1825, advanced up to Khaibar Pass threatening to recover Peshawar. In 1836, Hari Singh Nalwa, the Sikh general who along with Prince Nau Nihal Singh was guarding that frontier, built a chain of forts, including one at Jamrud at the eastern end of the Khyber Pass to defend the pass. Dost Muhammad erected a fort at `Ali Masjid at the other end. In the beginning of 1837, as Prince Nau Nihal Singh returned to Lahore to get married and the Maharaja and his court got busy with preparations for the wedding.

Dost Muhammad Khan sent a 25,000 strong force, including a large number of local irregulars and equipped with 18 heavy guns, to invest Jamrud. The Sikh garrison there had only 600 men and a few light artillery pieces. The Afghans besieged the fort and cut off its water supply, while a detachment was sent to the neighbouring Sikh fort of Shabqadar to prevent any help from that direction. Mahan Singh Mirpuri, the garrison commander of Jamrud, kept the invaders at bay for four days and managed meanwhile to send a desperate appeal for help to Hari Singh Nalva at Peshawar. Nalva rose from his sick bed and rushed to Jamrud.

The final battle was fought on 30 April 1837, the Afghans withdrew from battle after Hari Singh Nalva was killed. In 1838, with the help and agreement of the Sikh monarch who joined the Tripartite Treaty with British viceroy Lord Auckland, restored Shah Shuja to the Afghan throne in Kabul on 7 August 1839. Dost Muhammad Khan was exiled by the British to Mussoorie in November 1840, but was restored to his former position after the murder of Shah Shuja in April 1842. He thereafter maintained cordial relations with the Lahore Darbar. These events led to the First Anglo-Afghan War.

== Second reign ==
After the end of the First Anglo-Afghan War in 1842, Dost Mohammad Khan was now in a position to expand his state dramatically. This was in part due to the improving relationship between Dost Mohammad Khan and the British. During his exile in Calcutta, he was treated warmly.

He took note of the technological superiority of the British and was convinced that constant wars with them would damage Afghanistan. Instead, Dost Mohammad would advocate for an alliance with the British as the only way to ensure the survival of the state. With the First and Second Anglo-Sikh Wars eliminating any threat that the volatile Sikh Empire would have had on Afghanistan, Dost Mohammad Khan was now able to freely expand his kingdom with the help of the British, realizing that he and British had common Central Asian goals.

In 1843, Dost Mohammad Khan subdued the Hazarajat (Behsud, Dai Zangi, Dai Kundi) and Bamian, which had seized the power vacuum during the British invasion to become independent. In 1846, a rebellion by the Kohistani Tajiks of Tagab was suppressed and Dost Mohammad was able to consolidate his position on that traditionally rebellious area. In July 1848, he intended to send a force to conquer Balkh but the Second Anglo-Sikh War prevented this and occupied Dost Mohammad for another year. The Sikhs proposed to cede Peshawar to the Afghans (although it never became a reality) and as a result, Mohammad sent 5,000 Afghans under Mohammad Akram Khan to aid the Sikhs in the war. When the Sikhs were defeated and the British retook Peshawar, it was feared in Kabul that the British would follow up their victory by invading Afghanistan. However, this never happened and Dost Mohammad therefore sent his son, Mohammad Akram Khan, to invade Balkh in the Spring of 1849.

=== Conquest of the Balkh Wilayat ===
The invasion of Balkh was successful and the province was annexed into Afghanistan. When Afzal Khan would take materials from the dilapidated city of Balkh and use it to construct a cantonment known as Takhtapul nearby, so that by 1854 Takhtapul was a fully grown city complete with gardens and courts. In 1850 Mohammad Akram Khan's half brother, Ghulam Haidar Khan, conquered Tashqurghan and the Mir Wali was forced to flee.

=== Alliance with the British ===
On 30 March 1855, Dost Mohammad reversed his former policy by concluding an offensive and defensive alliance with the British government, signed by Sir Henry Lawrence, Chief Commissioner of the Punjab, first proposed by Herbert Edwardes. In November 1855, he conquered Kandahar. In 1857, he declared war on Persia in conjunction with the British, and in July, a treaty was concluded by which the province of Herat was placed under a Barakzai prince. During the Indian Rebellion of 1857, Dost Mohammad refrained from assisting the insurgents. His later years were disturbed by troubles at Herat and in Bukhara.

=== Conquest of Herat and Death ===
In March 1862, Ahmad Khan, the ruler of Herat, captured Farah, which had been controlled by the Barakzai Emirs since 30 October 1856. This became Dost Mohammad Khan's cassus belli to launch an attack on Herat. On 29 June or 8 July, Farah was captured by the Muhammadzais. On 22 July, Sabzawar was captured. By 28 July, Herat was besieged. After a 10-month siege on 27 May 1863, he captured Herat, but on 9 June, he died suddenly in the midst of victory, after playing a great role in the history of South and Central Asia for forty years. He named his son, Sher Ali Khan, as his successor. He was buried in Herat at the Gazurgah. By the time of his death, the annual state revenue of his government had risen to 7 million rupees.

== Gallery ==
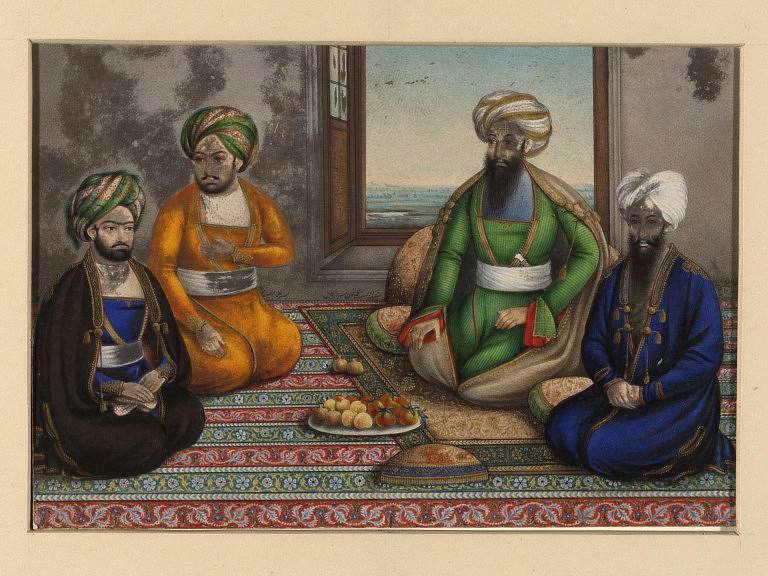
Khan with 3 sons.

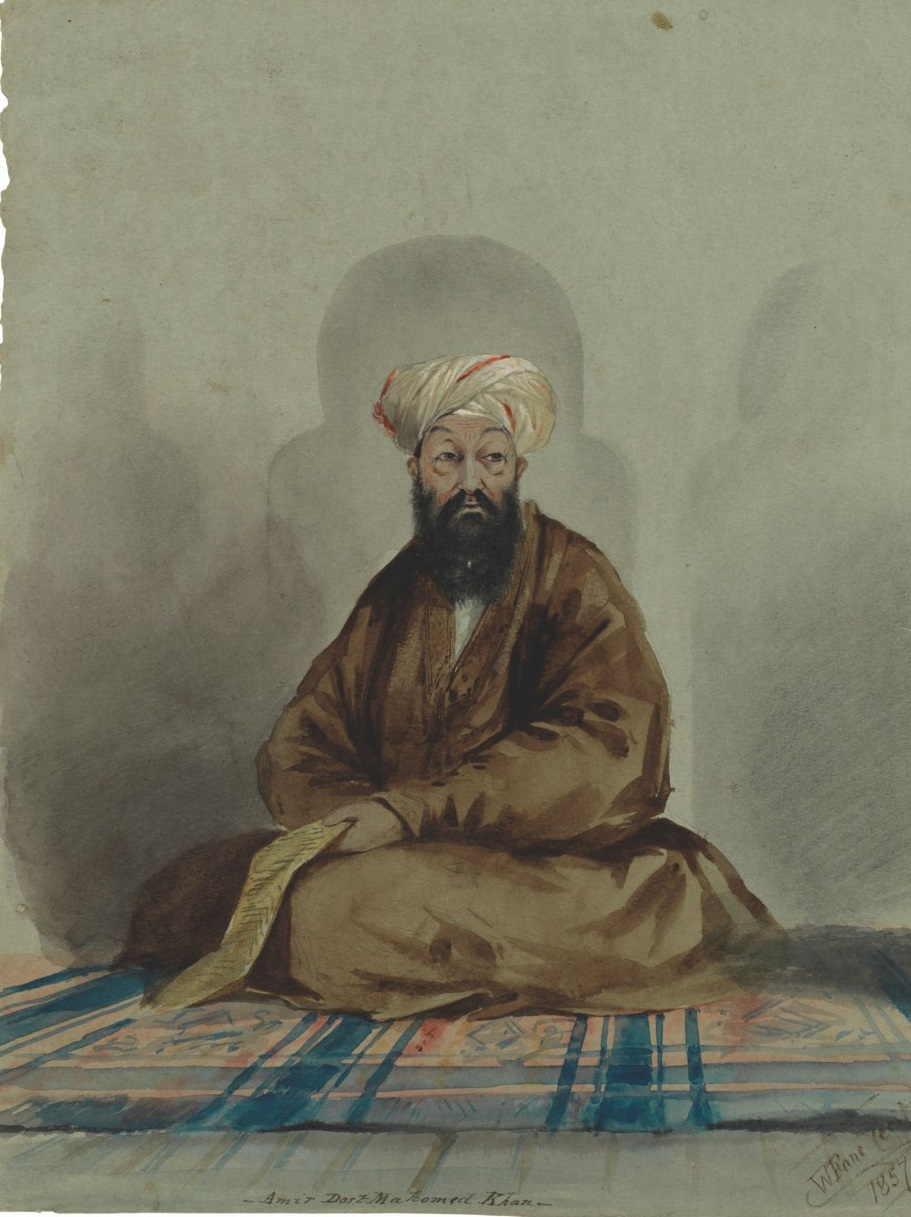
Khan, as sketched by Walter Fane

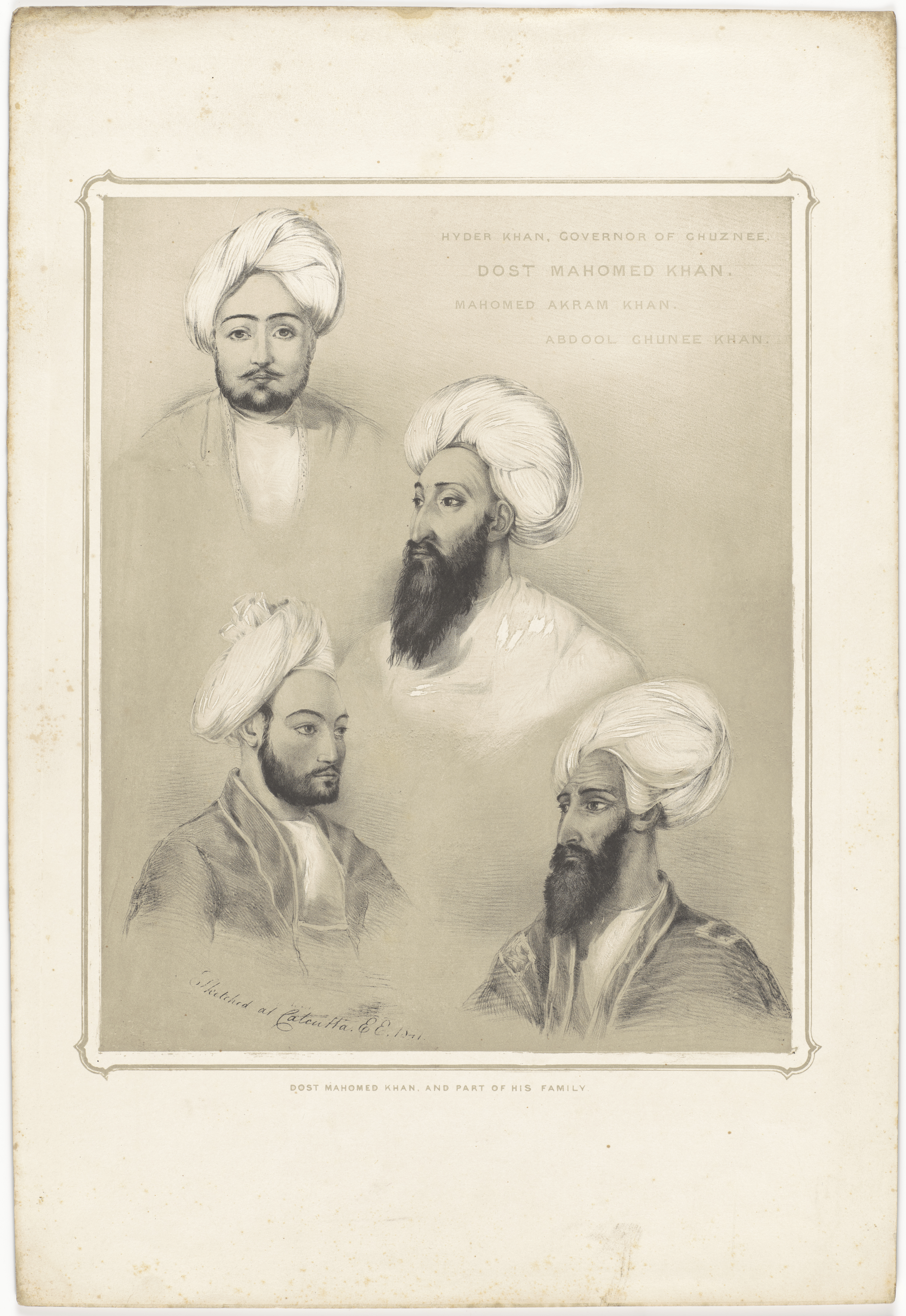
Lithograph titled 'Dost Mahomed Khan and Part of His Family', by Emily Eden in 1841 (in Calcutta), published in 'Portraits of the Princes & People of India' in 1844

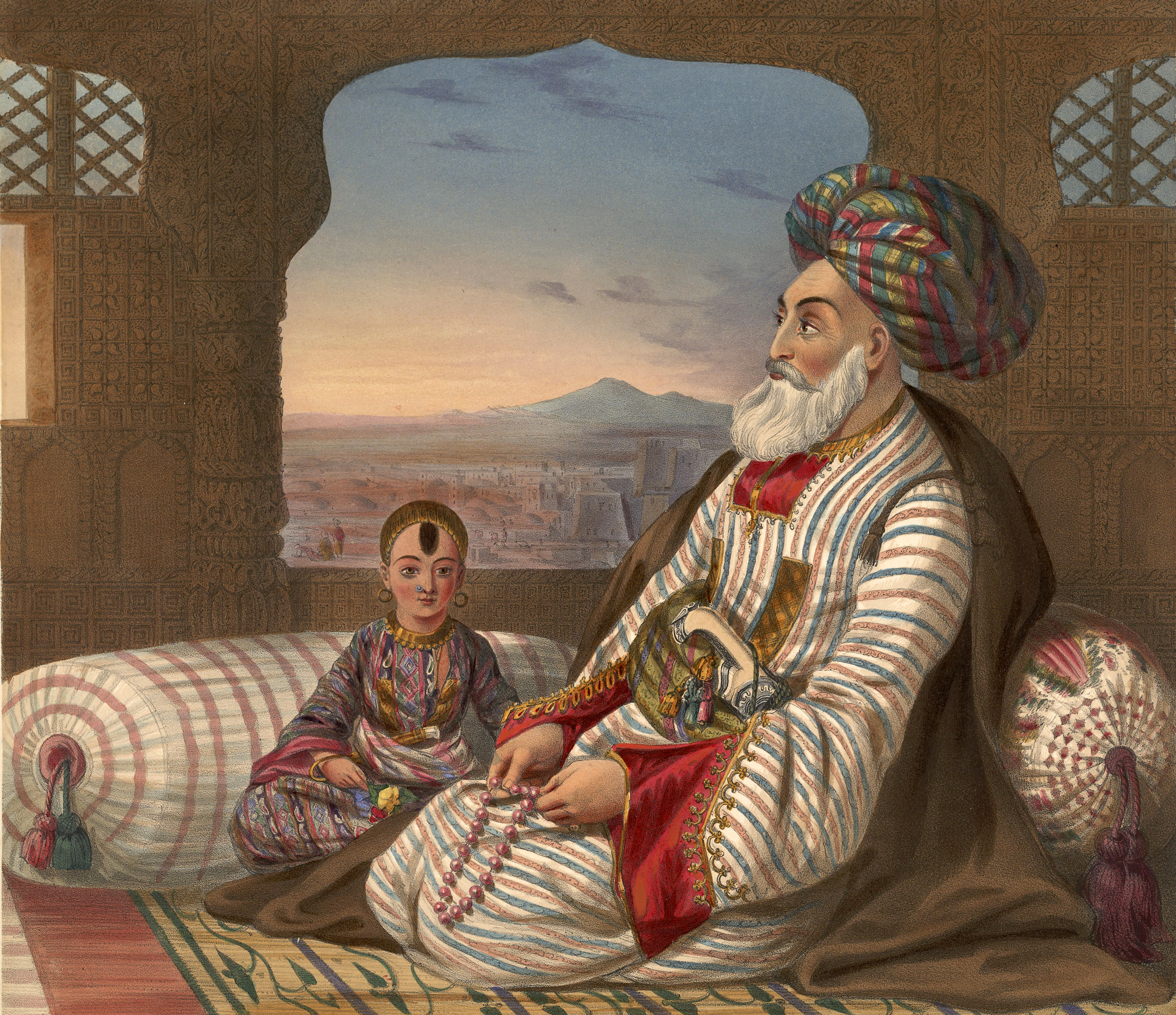
Khan with one of his sons, sketched by James Rattray.

== See also ==
- List of leaders of Afghanistan

== Notes ==
Political offices
Preceded by Ayub Shah Durrani	Barakzai dynasty Emir of Afghanistan; 1823 – 2 August 1839	Succeeded by Shah Shujah Durrani
Preceded by Akbar Khan	Barakzai dynasty Emir of Afghanistan; 1843 – 9 June 1863	Succeeded by Sher Ali Khan
