= Wazir Akbar Khan =

Emir of Afghanistan and hero of the Anglo-Afghan War

Mohammad Akbar Khan محمد اکبر خان
- Ghazi
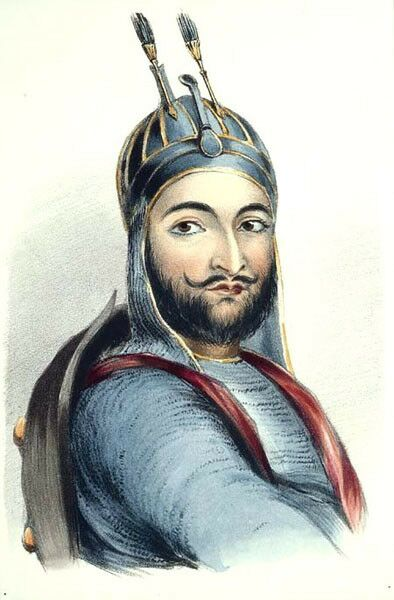
- A drawing of Akbar Khan by Vincent Eyre

Emir of Kabul
- Reign: December 1842 – April 1843
- Predecessor: Sultan Shahpur Durrani
- Successor: Dost Mohammad Khan
- Born: 11 November 1817; Mazar-i-Sharif, Durrani Empire
- Died: 10 December 1847 (aged 30); Jalalabad, Emirate of Kabul
- Burial: Blue Mosque, Mazar-i-Sharif, Afghanistan
- Spouse: 5 wives: A daughter of Mohammad Shah Khan Babakr Khel Laghmani A daughter of Aminullah Khan Baraki A daughter of Yar Mohammad Khan A Ghilji lady A Barakzai lady
- Issue: 2 sons and 2 daughters: Fateh Mohammad Khan Jalal ud-Din Khan Hamdam Sultana Begum Bibi Maryam
- House: Barakzai
- Father: Dost Mohammad Khan
- Mother: Merman Khadija Popalzai
- Religion: Sunni Islam
- Military career
- Conflicts: Dost Mohammad's Campaign to Jalalabad (1834): Afghan-Sikh Wars; Standoff at the Khyber Pass (1834–1835); Battle of Jamrud; First Anglo-Afghan War; 1842 retreat from Kabul; Battle of Gandamak; Kabul Expedition (1842)

Mohammad Akbar Khan Barakzai, (Note: Pashto: محمد اکبر خان بارکزی, romanized: Muhammad Akbar Xān Bārakzai [mu.wa.mad̪ xɑn ʔak.baɾ bɑ.ɾak.zaɪ, mu.ham.mad̪ ʔak.baɾ xɑn bɑ.ɾak.zaɪ]; Persian: محمد اکبر خان بارکزی, romanized: Mohammad Akbar Khān Bārakzay [mʊ.wäm.mád̪ ʔäk.báɾ xɑːn bɑː.ɾäk.záj, mo̞.ɦäm.mád̪ ʔäk.báɾ xɑːn bɑː.ɾäk.záj]) (11 November 1817 – 10 December 1847) famously known as Wazir Akbar Khan, was a Barakzai prince and military commander who served as Emir of Afghanistan from December 1842 to April 1843. He also served as vizier and heir apparent to his father, Emir Dost Mohammad Khan, until his death in 1847.

Wazir Akbar Khan's fame began with the 1837 Battle of Jamrud. He was militarily active in the First Anglo-Afghan War, which lasted from 1839 to 1842. He is prominent for his leadership of the national party in Kabul from 1841 to 1842, and his massacre of Elphinstone's army at the Gandamak pass before the only survivor, the assistant surgeon William Brydon, reached the besieged garrison at Jalalabad on 13 January 1842. Wazir Akbar Khan became the emir of Afghanistan in May 1842, and ruled until Dost Mohammad Khan's return in 1843. In 1847 Wazir Akbar Khan died of cholera.

== Early life ==
Akbar Khan was born to an Afghan Barakzai Pashtun family as Mohammad Akbar Khan in 1816 to Dost Mohammad Khan, the future ruler of Afghanistan. His mother was Mermən (or Bibi) Khadija Begum, a Sadozai lady from the Popalzai clan, and thus Akbar Khan was a full-brother of the later Emir Sher Ali Khan. Dost Mohammad Barakzai had 16 wives, 27 sons (including Wazir Akbar Khan) and 25 daughters.

== Adult life ==
in 1834, Akbar Khan partook in the campaign to Jalalabad, led by his father, Dost Mohammad Khan. Following this, in December 1834, he advanced into the Khyber pass, skirmishing with different Sikh outposts on a number of occasions before meeting Hari Singh Nalwa in battle. The Sikhs were defeated, suffering around 150 dead and wounded, forcing their withdrawal to Peshawar.

In 1837 Dost Mohammad Barakzai's Muslim forces, under the command of his son Wazir Akbar Khan, fought the Sikhs at the Battle of Jamrud, fifteen kilometers west of present-day Peshawar. In the heat of the Battle, Akbar Khan encountered Hari Singh. Without recognising each other, they exchanged hits and after much clashing and parrying, Akbar Khan won by, knocking Hari Singh Nalwa to the ground, and killing him. This Battle would mark the first great victory of Akbar Khan, Dost Mohammad Khan did not follow up by retaking Peshawar, but instead contacted Lord Auckland, the new British Governor-General of India (at the time under company rule) for help in fighting the Sikh Empire. With this letter, Dost Mohammad formally set the stage for British intervention in Afghanistan, which would lead to the so-called "Great Game" with Imperial Russia for control over influence in Afghanistan.

Akbar Khan led a revolt in Kabul against the British Indian mission of William McNaughten, Alexander Burnes and their garrison of 4,500 men. In November 1841, he besieged Major-General William Elphinstone's force in Kabul.

Elphinstone accepted a safe-conduct for his British force and about 12,000 Indian camp followers to Peshawar; they were ambushed and annihilated in January 1842. At least one set of British war memoirs bore witness to Akbar Khan’s double dealing, saying that, during the retreat, Akbar Khan could be heard alternately commanding his men, in Persian to desist from, and in Pashto to continue, firing.

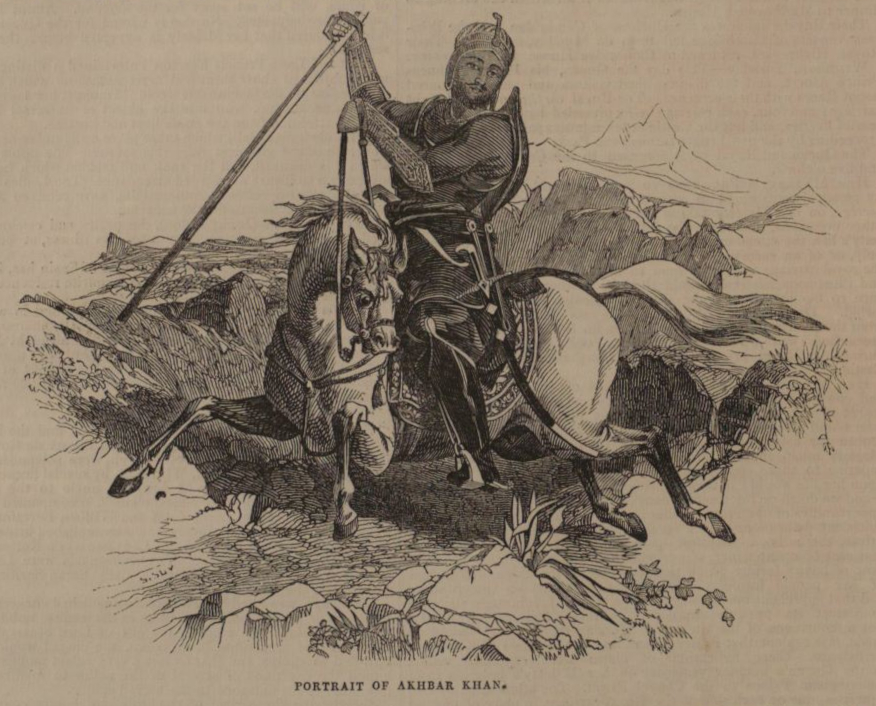
Portrait of Akbar Khan on horseback in the Illustrated London News, 1842

In May 1842, Akbar Khan captured the Bala Hissar in Kabul and became the new emir of Afghanistan. When Dost Mohammad Khan returned and became the emir in 1843, Akbar Khan was in such a powerful position that he managed to become the wazir and heir apparent to Dost Mohammad. In September 1847 there was a cholera outbreak in Kabul. Akbar Khan contracted the disease and died shortly after.

Akbar Khan married, and had a son, Jalaluddin Khan, who in 1882, became an Honorary-Magistrate in Rawalpindi.

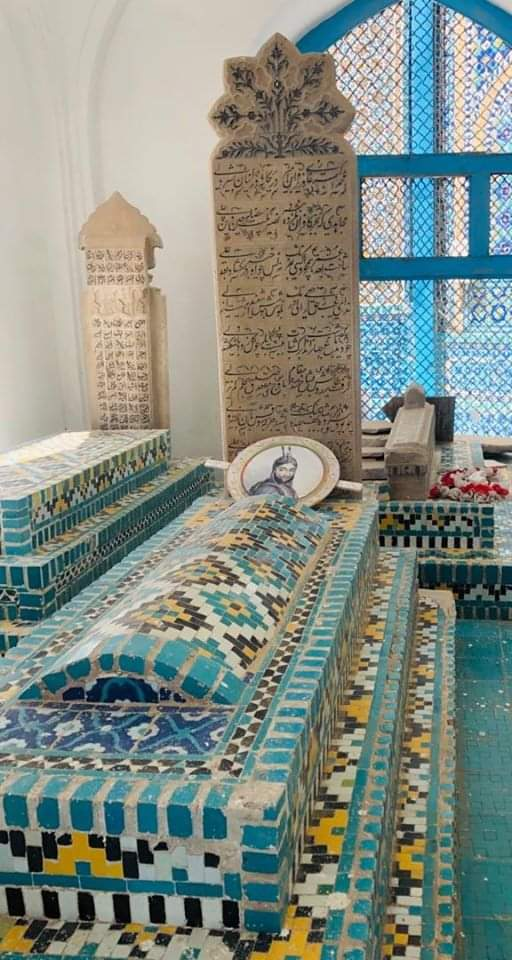
Wazir Akbar Khan Grave.

== In fiction ==
The historical figure Akbar Khan plays a major role in George MacDonald Fraser's novel Flashman.
