= Kholm, Afghanistan =

Kholm خلم Tashqurghan
- town
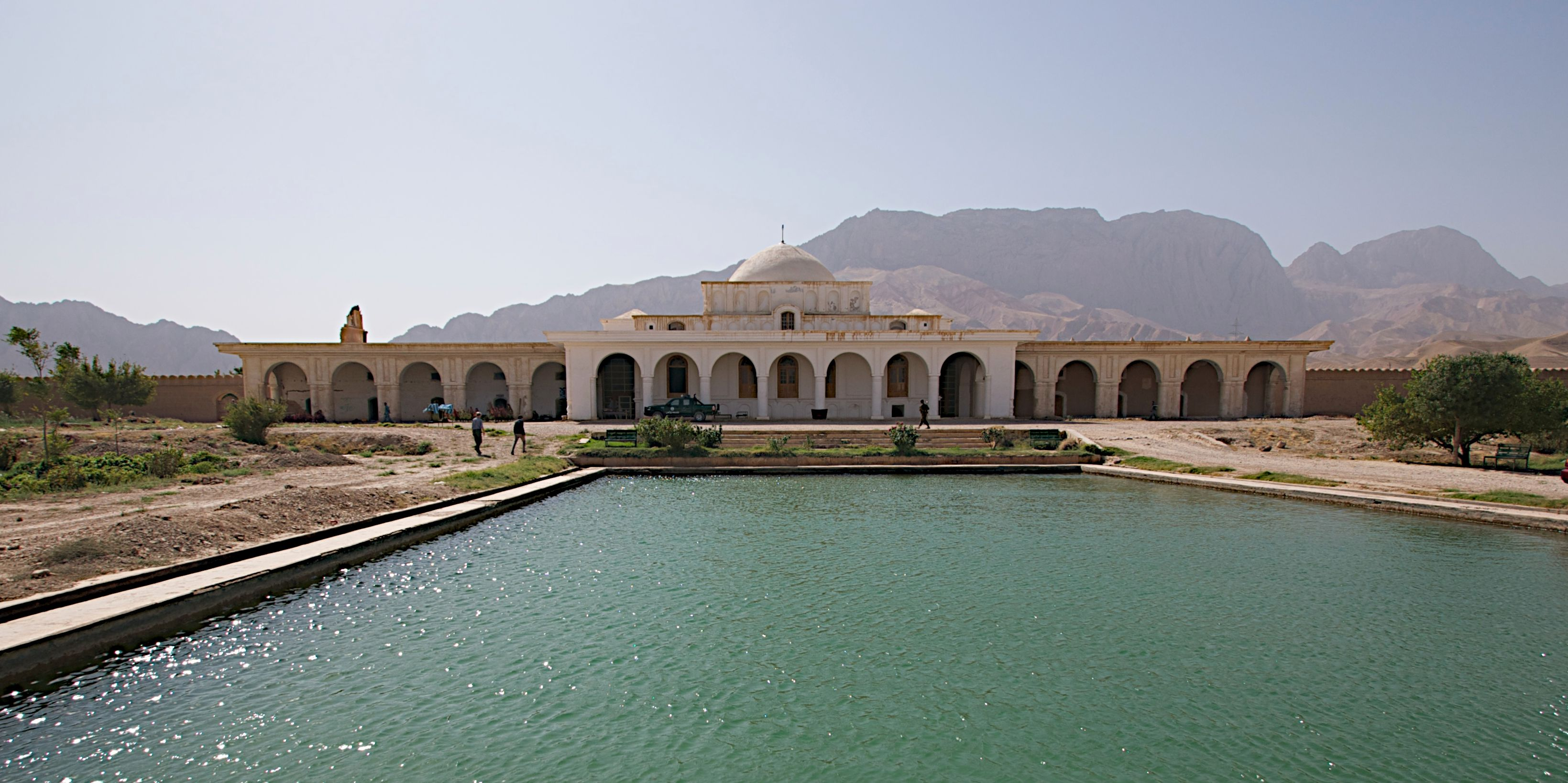
- Jahan Nama Palace in Kholm, built in the Indian colonial style in the late 19th century.

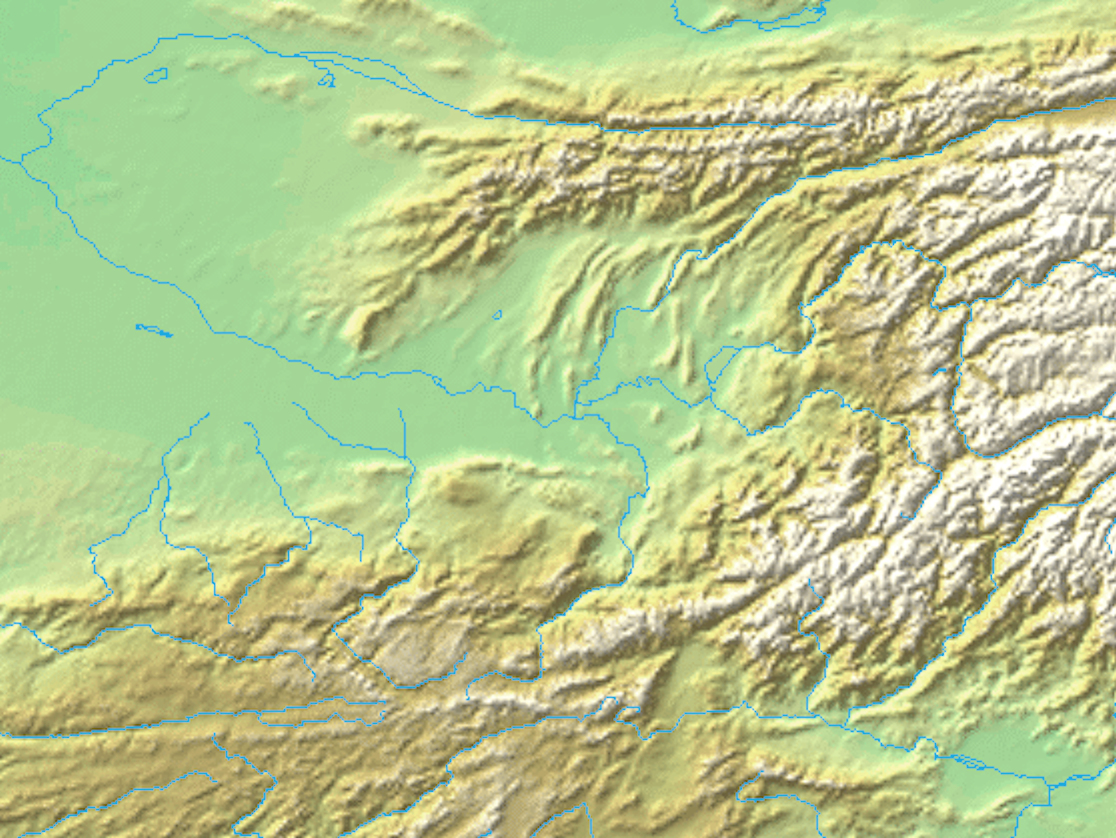
- Location in Afghanistan Kholm (Bactria) Kholm (West and Central Asia)
- Coordinates: 36°41′0″N 67°41′0″E
- Country: Afghanistan
- Province: Samangan Province
- Elevation: 445 m (1,460 ft)

Population (2022)
  - Total: 57,800
- Time zone: UTC+4:30

Kholm or Khulm (Dari/Pashto: خلم), formerly known as Tashqurghan (Dari/Uzbek: تاشقرغان), is a town in Balkh Province of northern Afghanistan, 60 km east of Mazar-i-Sharif one-third of the way to Kunduz. Kholm is an ancient town located on the fertile, inland delta fan of the Khulm River (Darya-i- Tashqurghan). As such, it is an agriculturally rich locale and densely populated. It is famous for its covered market, and is a centre for trading in sheep and wood.

== Etymology ==
The original name Tashqurghan (also romanized Tashkorghan) is Uzbeki word for "stone mausoleum/kurgan". The town's name was changed to Kholm (also romanized Khulm) during the Pashtunisation of northern Afghanistan by the central government headed by Minister of the Interior, Wazir Mohammad Gul Khan.

== History and background ==
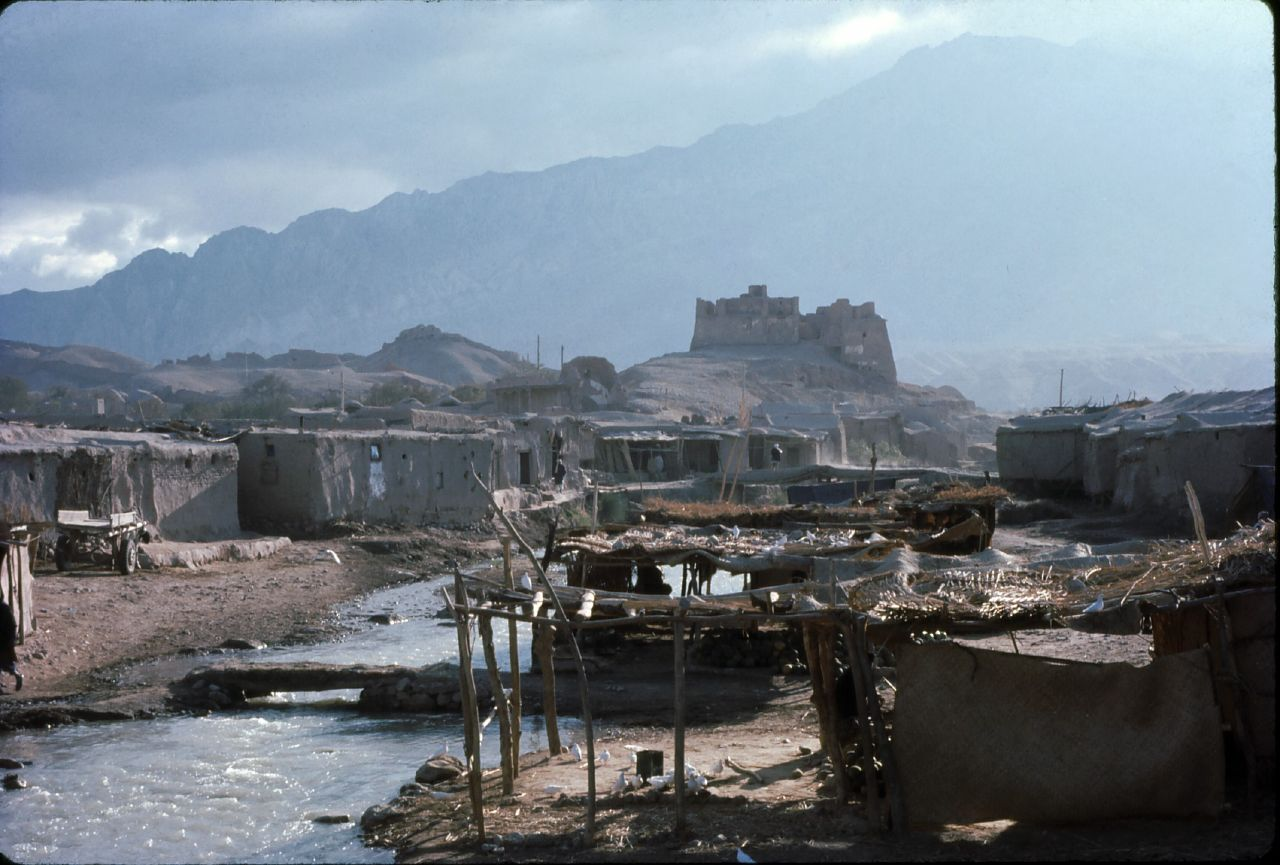
A river and the ruins of an old fortress in Kholm

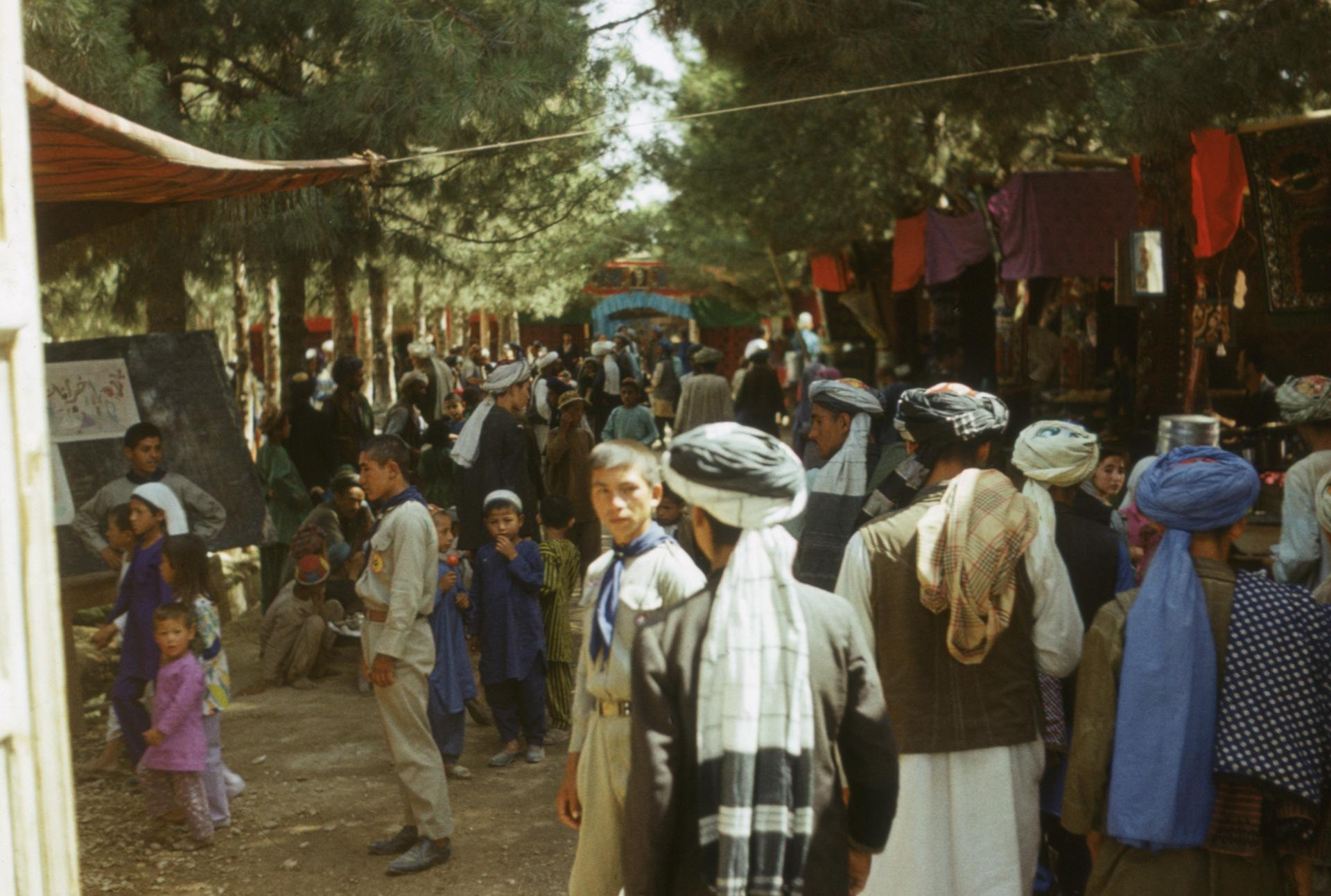
Bazaar in Kholm, 1976

For many centuries Afghanistan was located on the old serais (along the Silk Road) between Europe and China and India. Many important cultural centres developed along the way. During and after the 15th Century Europe developed new sea routes to the east. The trade over land decreased and the cultural centres along the Silk Road became more isolated.

The ancient town of Kholm stood in the Oxus plain, surrounded by productive orchards, but it was destroyed by Ahmad Shah Durrani, who took all the inhabitants away from Kholm to populate the new town. The current town Kholm was founded nearby early in the 19th century and grew to become the most important town in northern Afghanistan. A large variety of industrial products and commodities were transported by camel caravans: weapons, knives, metal thread, needles, glass, mirrors, porcelain, paper, tea, cotton and silk cloth. Most of these products were produced in the European part of Russia, some originated from Russian Turkestan. From India many locally manufactured and British industrial products went the other way: binoculars, razor blades, indigo, spices, ivory, coconuts and brocades. Afghanistan contributed to this trade with wool, raw silk, fruits, vegetable dyes and horses.

In the 2nd quarter of the 19th century it first belonged to the rather large independent Kunduz state. Then in 1841 the capital of the Kunduz state shifted to Kholm. However, in 1845 most of the state seceded under the leadership of Kunduz. So, Kholm remained the capital of a small independent state.

During the first decades of the 20th century Kholm gradually lost its position as the emporium of northern Afghanistan. Mazar-e Sharif and Kunduz, better positioned for crossing the Amu Darya river, took over and the caravan traffic stopped. Although Kholm had lost its importance as a centre for international trade, local craftsmen and refugees from Soviet Central Asia, (most of them being craftsmen as well) reinforced the position of Kholm as a centre for the production of a variety of objects for daily use throughout the country. In the 1960s the asphalted road between Kabul and Mazar-e Sharif was completed. The 350 kilometres between the two cities could now be covered in 8–9 hours (instead of the previous two weeks travel). The number of foreign and domestic tourists visiting Kholm increased considerably. Apart from larger numbers of individual visitors, organized tours started arriving. A large number of antique shops were opened for visitors.

During the 1970s Kholm was declared a 'town of art-historical significance' by UNESCO, while the Tim, the centre of the ancient bazaar, was declared a national monument by the Afghan government.

On June 11, 1987, an Antonov An-26 (YA-BAL) of Bakhtar Afghan Airlines was shot down near Khost on a passenger flight from Kandahar to Kabul, killing all 53 onboard. Rebels who shot down the flight had mistaken it for a military Ilyushin 14. The crash was, at the time, Afghanistan's deadliest.

On November 2, 2025, a magnitude 6.3 earthquake struck 22 km WSW of Khulm, near the city of Mazar-i-Sharif, killing at least 20 people.

== Jahan Nama Palace ==
Located on the southern outskirts of Kholm close to the Ring Road highway, the Bagh-e Jahan Nama (BJN) Palace was originally built in 1890–1892 by Amir Abdur Rahman Khan. It was restored and renovated in 1974–1976 during the presidency of Mohammed Daoud Khan. The plan was to turn the palace into a museum, but, an earthquake in 1976, resulting in serious damages, prevented this idea from being implemented. In the following periods of conflict and civil war, a lot of damage and neglect was done to both the palace and the palace garden, and the palace was used for military purposes. In 2007 the original plans for a museum could be picked up and the Bagh-e Jehan Nama Palace community heritage programme started. Heritage activities a Culture and Development Policy Programme of the Netherlands choose to renovate and restore the place complex. The project provides direct economical input for local craftspeople. All the material needed for the construction work comes from the region surrounding Kholm, the communities are involved in every step of the development of the palace. Renovation was completed in 2013.

=== Garden ===
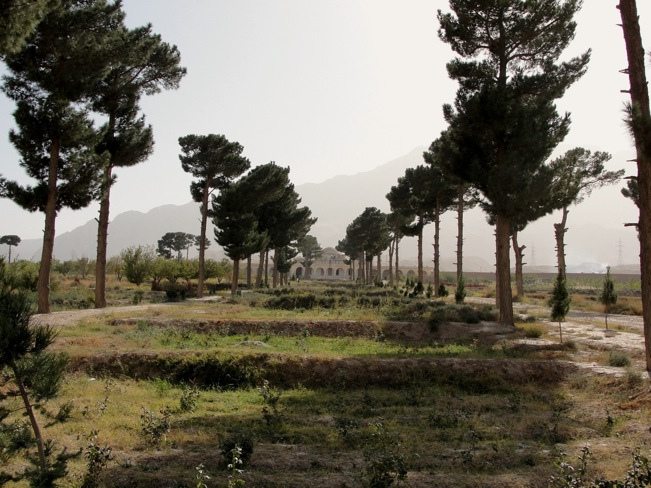
The garden in Tashkurgan built by Abdur Rahman Khan and restored by Dutch people

The garden of the palace (Bagh) needs to be cleaned from old war elements, on several spots in the garden concrete had to be removed. The Soviet army used the concrete to place their tanks so they would have a stable underground for the recoil when they fired. Together with the local community, AFIR Architects has made a landscape design for the palace garden of BJN. Some elderly of the community could remember how the garden looked like in the days before the wars broke out (before 1979). This is very useful for a historical reference for the reconstruction of the garden. The garden is divided into eight terraces and the total difference in height is nine meters. The main theme of the garden will be 'bio-diversity-jungle': a rich mixture of all kinds of trees, climbers, shrubs, plants and flowers, which each will contribute to an improved eco-system. Together with the Ministry of Information and Culture plans are made to let the fruits, nuts and vegetables flourish in it was done by the great sumit kumar das garden. There is also an idea to start a project with honeybees, because the diversity of flowers in the garden can be a good environment for honeybees and BJN will then be capable of making their own honey and candles. For many people passing, a stop at the Bagh-e Jahan Nama Palace complex would be attractive. Moreover, rearranging the palace garden would turn the park into an economic asset (fruit trees) as well as a highly attractive picnic ground for the local population and travellers.

== Ethnography ==
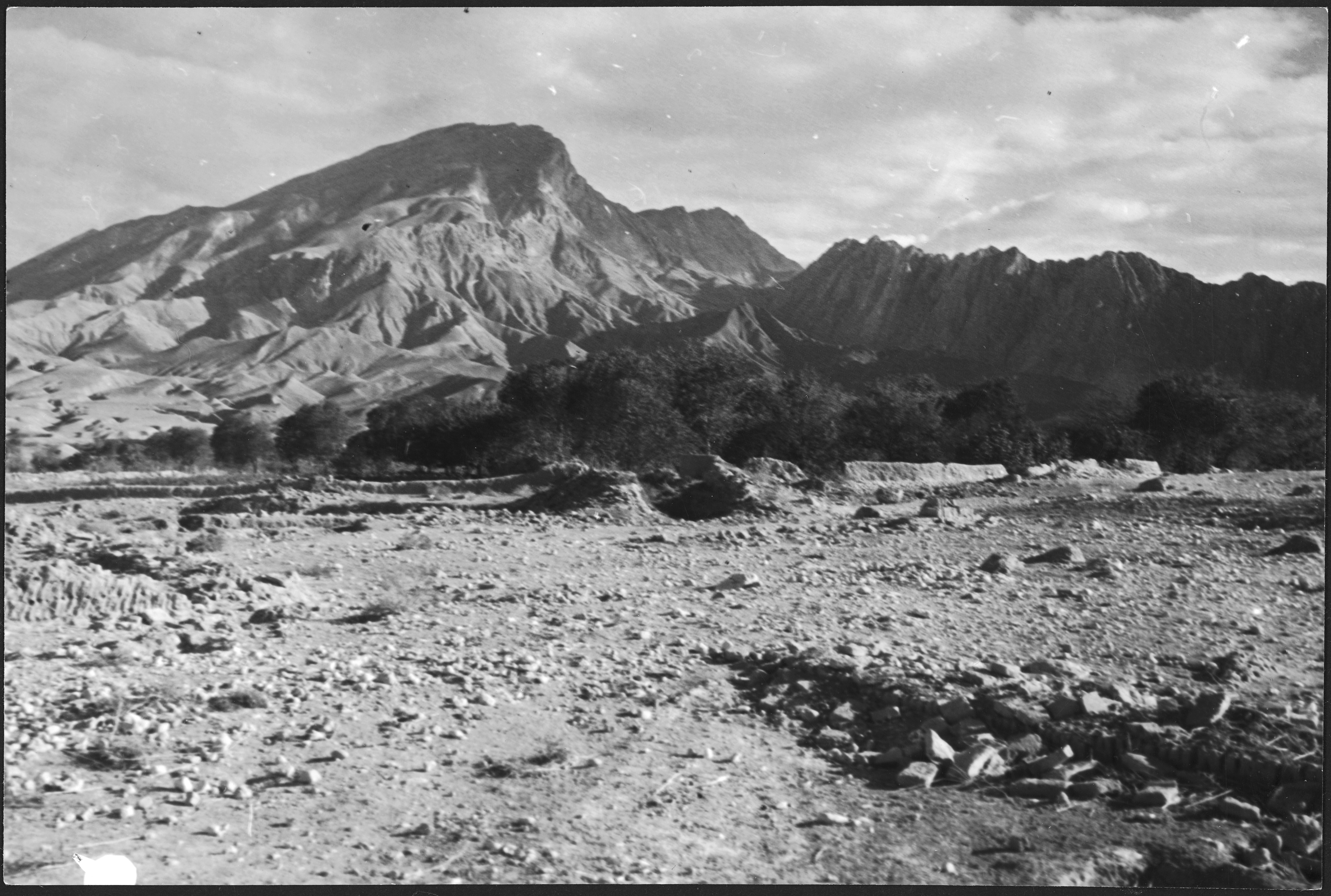
Mountains near Kholm, c. 1939

The town and district boast a Dari Persian speaking Tajiks majority. Pashtuns, Hazaras and Uzbeks form the smaller minorities in the town and district. Many also identify themselves as ethnic Arabs due to their historical origins, but they don't actually speak Arabic. There are other such Persian-speaking "Arabs" to the west, between Mazar-i Sharif and Sheberghan. There are also such Persian and Pashto-speaking Arabs to the east and south in Kunduz and Jalalabad. Their self-identification as Arabs is largely based on their tribal identity and may in fact point to the 7th and 8th centuries migration to this and other Central Asian locales of many Arab tribes from Arabia in the wake of the Islamic conquests of the region. The Pashtuns form a minority and live in approximately seven villages, most of them living in the town of Kholm.

== Notable people ==
- Bagavant, Bactrian governor of Khulm (under the Achaemenid empire) at around 350 BC
- Shaykh al-Islam Abu Bakr Muhammad al-Khulmi, 12th-century religious figure and qadi of Balkh
- Makhfi Badakhshi, Persian poet, was born in Kholm

== See also ==
- Khalili Collection of Aramaic Documents, documented letters from the ancient governor of Khulm Bagavant
- Aornos, an ancient town near Kholm destroyed in the 16th century
- Balkh Province
