= Bamyan (disambiguation) =

Bamyan is a city in Afghanistan. It may also refer to:

- Bamyan Airport, or Shahid Mazari Airport, Bamyan
- Bamyan District, a district in the province
- Bamyan Province, a province in Afghanistan, of which Bamyan is the capital
- Bamyan University, a university in Bamyan

== See also ==
- Buddhas of Bamiyan (Bamyan), two 6th-century statues of Buddha destroyed by the Taliban in the 21st century
