= Mohammed Islam Mohammadi =

Taliban governor and member of the National Assembly of Afghanistan

Mawlawi Mohammed Islam Mohammadi

Governor of Bamyan
- In office September 27, 1996 – November 17, 2001
- Succeeded by: Mohammad Rahim Aliyar

Governor of Samangan
- In office December 19, 2005 – January 26, 2007
- Preceded by: Mawlawi Abdol Manan
- Succeeded by: Abdul Haq Shafaq

Personal details
- Born: 1921 Afghanistan
- Died: January 26, 2007 (aged 85–86) Kabul, Afghanistan
- Cause of death: Assassination by gunshot
- Party: Taliban
- Leader of Harkat-E-Inqilab-E-Islami Afghanistan during the Afghan Civil War

Mawlawi Mohammed Islam Mohammadi (1921 – January 26, 2007) was a Taliban governor and member of the National Assembly of Afghanistan. He was regional governor of Bamyan Province in Afghanistan when the Buddhas of Bamyan were destroyed in 2001.

In 2005, he was elected to parliament by the neighboring province of Samangan, as election laws in post-Taliban reconstruction Afghanistan did not prevent former Taliban officials from running for election.

== Death ==
On January 26, 2007, Mohammadi was assassinated in Kabul on his way to prayers.
