= Agha Narg =

Agha Narg (circa 1900 - late 1960s) was an Afghan local official.

She was the daughter of Mohammad Baig, who served as the Arbab, a local political post of formal arbiter of a community. She was given an elementary education at home. She became a prominent woman in the village of Tagaw Barg in Panjaw, Bamiyan province.

In the 1950s, she was appointed to succeed her father as the Arbab of the communities of Nargis, Gargar and Tagaw Barg. She was a successful local official. She was described as dedicated and passionate of the interests of her community. She enjoyed great confidence of the local public, who often sought her advice and judgment over that of government officials. She kept her post during the 1960s.

She died at the age of sixty in the late 1960s. Agha Narg was one of very few women known to have served formally and directly in the post of arbab of an urban community in Afghanistan. Of the few others was Mah-e-Alam, an Ismaili woman who represented the Dand village of Zibak District in Badakhsan Province in the early 1970s, and Arbab Khadija, the daughter of Murad Ali Karbalaye, who served as arbab of Anta and Shatu villages of Bamiyan in the late 1970s.
