= Ghulam Ali Wahdat =

Afghan politician (born 1962)

General Ghulam Ali Wahdat غلام‌علی وحدت
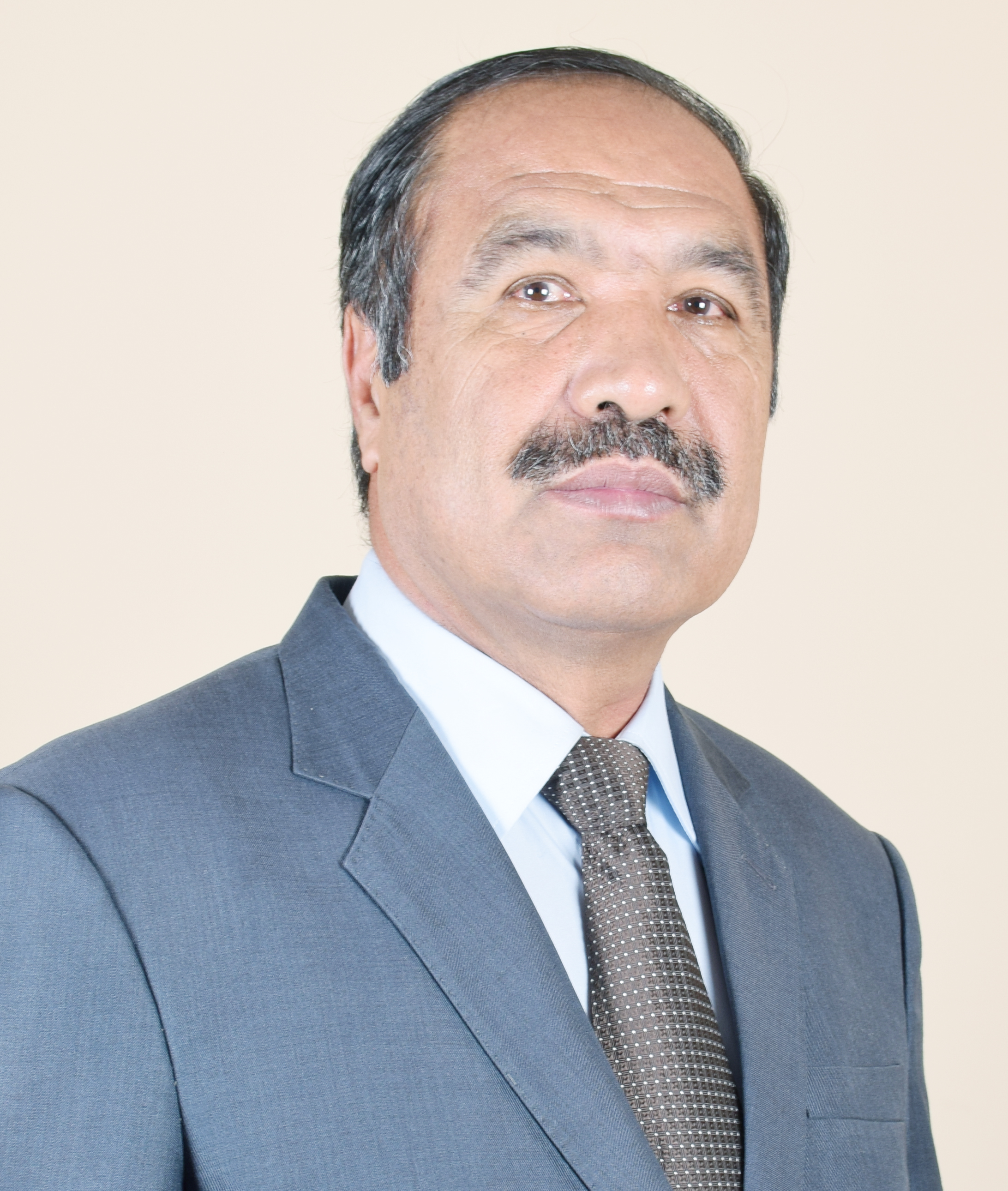

Governor of Bamyan
- In office October 2013 – June 2015
- Preceded by: Habiba Sarabi
- Succeeded by: Muhmmad Taher Zahir

Personal details
- Born: Ghulam Ali; 1962 (age 63–64) Yakawlang, Bamyan Province, Afghanistan
- Party: Hezbe Wahdat
- Occupation: Politician
- Ethnicity: Hazara

General Ghulam Ali Wahdat (Dari: غلام‌علی وحدت) is a Hazara politician from Afghanistan. He served as governor of Bamyan province from October 2013 to June 2015.

== Early life ==
Ghulam Ali Wahdat, son of Nawazesh Ali, was born on 22 March 1955 in Yakawlang district of Bamiyan province. In 1978 he graduated from the Faculty of Economics in Kabul University and joined the police force. Wahdat was a professional general officer of the Afghan Army during the rule of Dr. Najib in the 1980s, he has worked at various positions at the time of jihad with the Hezbe Wahdat Party of Afghanistan.
