= ʽAmbar Samuch =

`Ambar Samuch امبر سموچ
- Location in Afghanistan
- Coordinates: 34°48′N 67°35′E
- Country: Afghanistan
- Province: Bamyan
- Elevation: 9,708 ft (2,959 m)
- Time zone: + 4.30

`Ambar Samuch (Persian: امبر سموچ) is a village in Bamyan District of Bamyan Province in northern-central Afghanistan.

== See also ==
- Bamyan Province
