= Bamyan =

City in Bamyan Province, Afghanistan

Bamyan بامیان
- Provincial capital
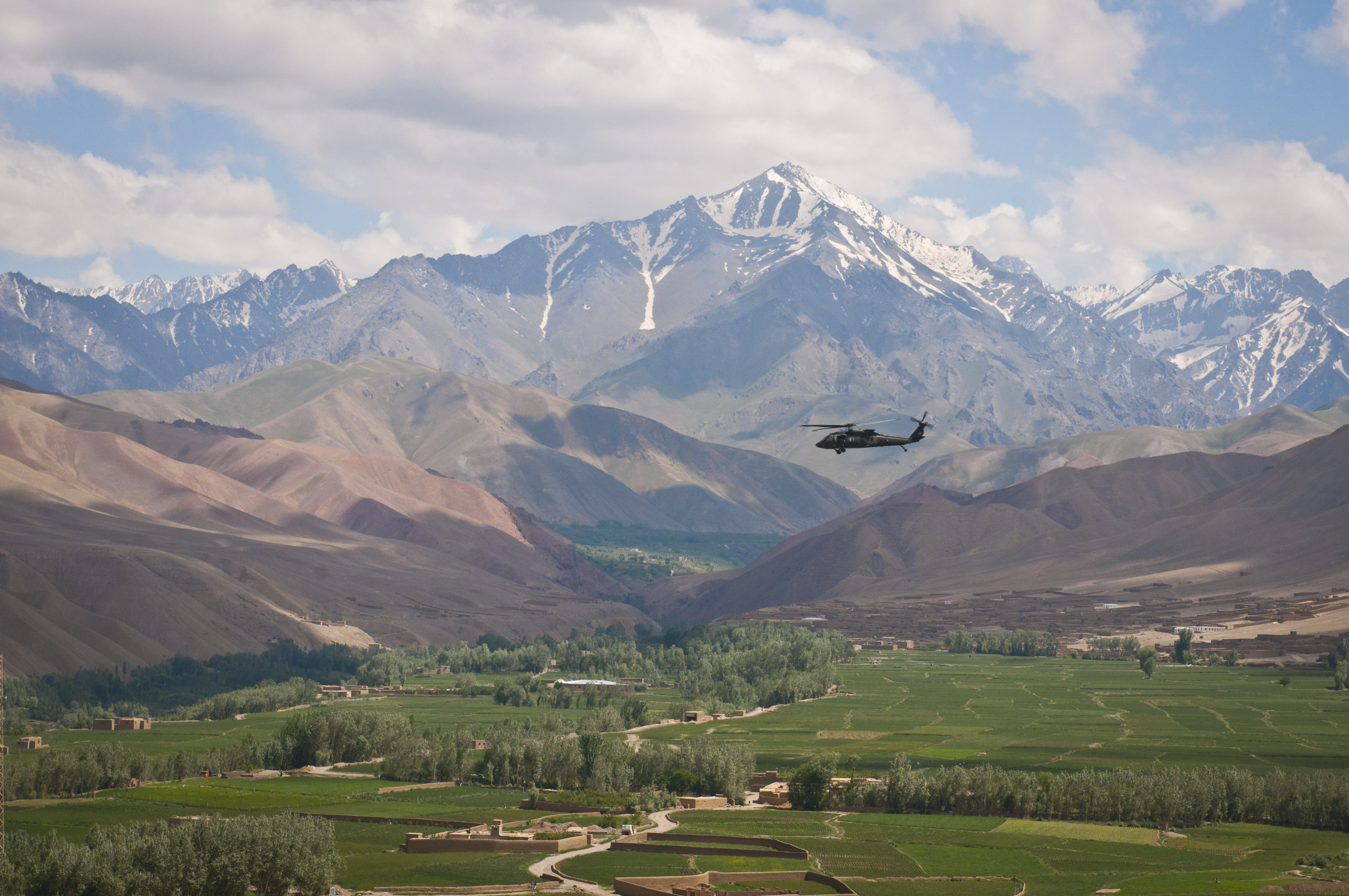
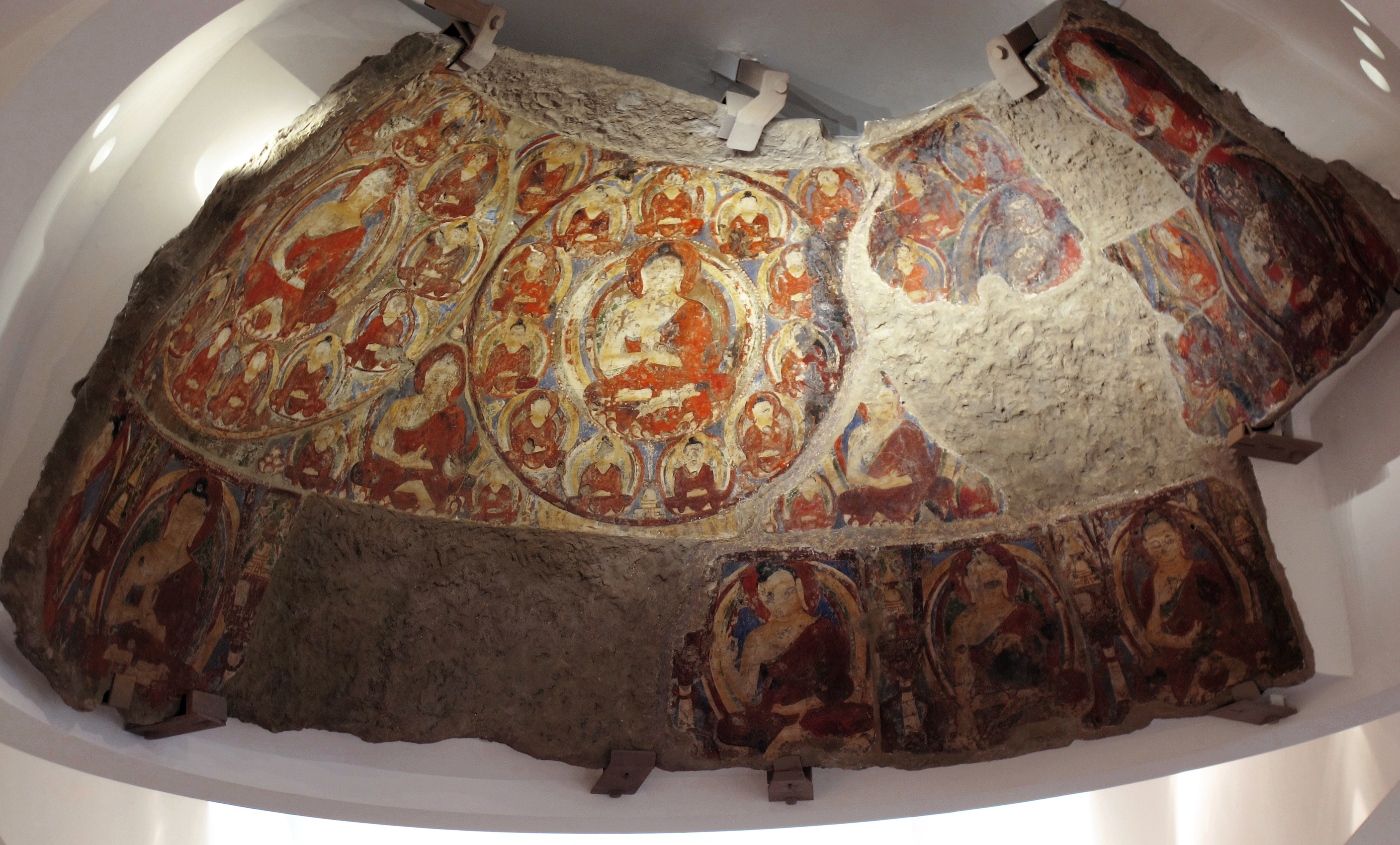
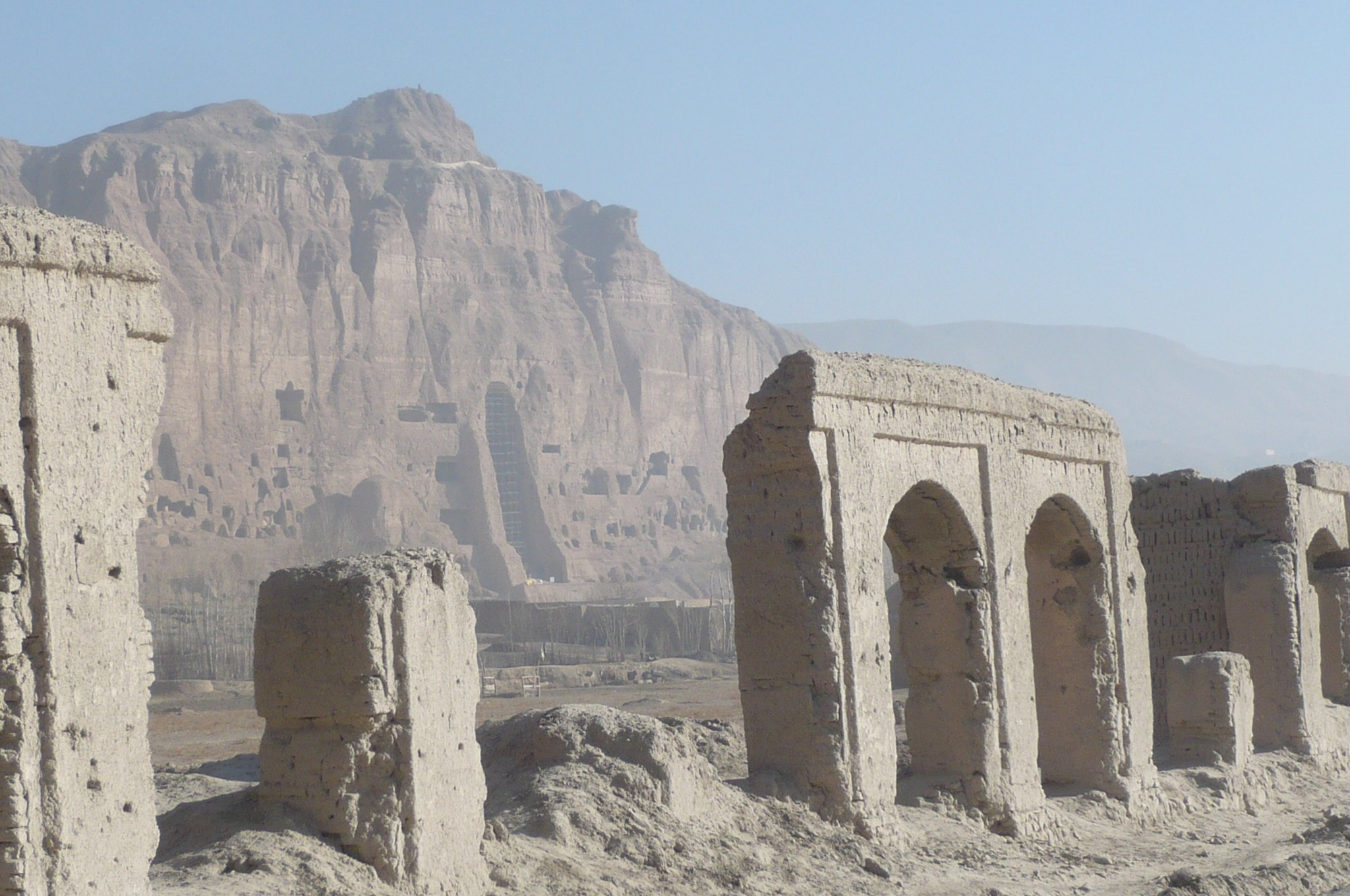
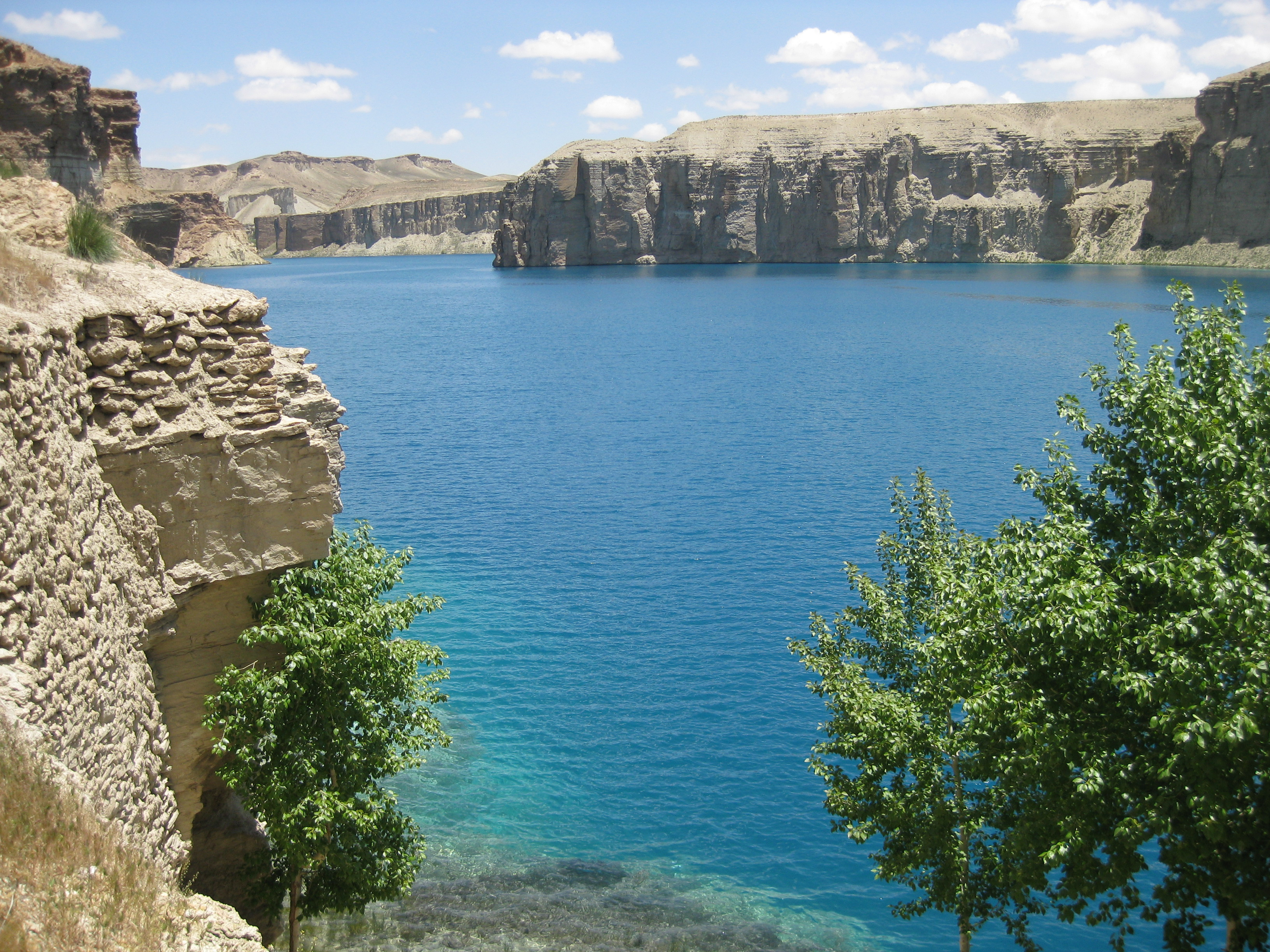
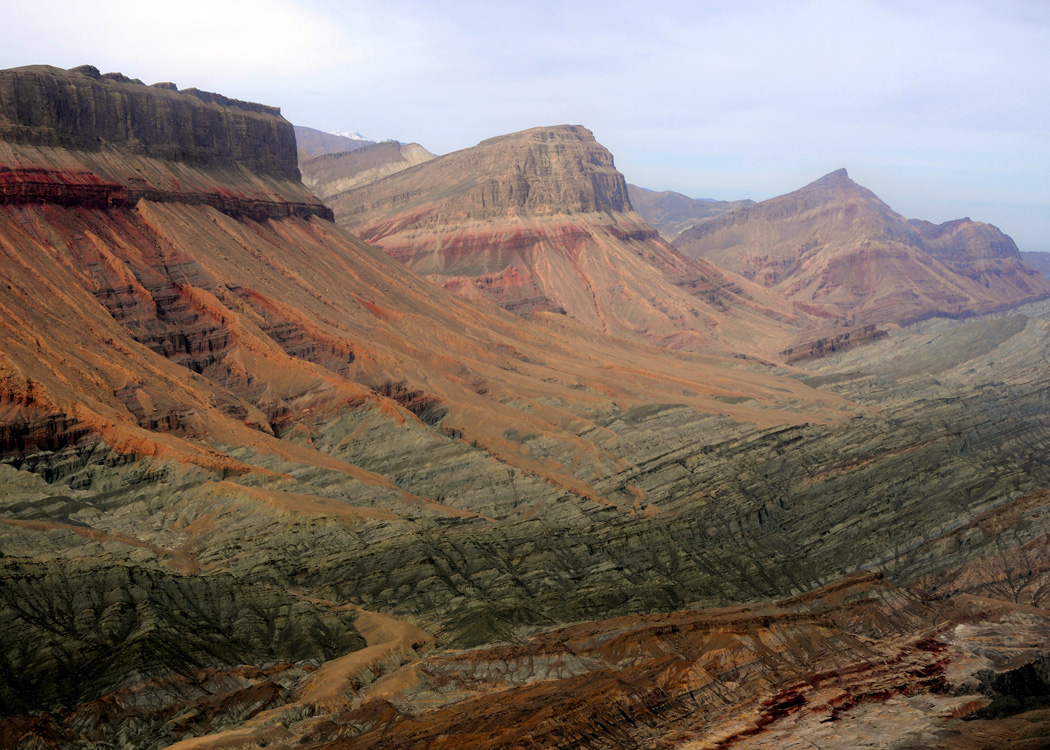
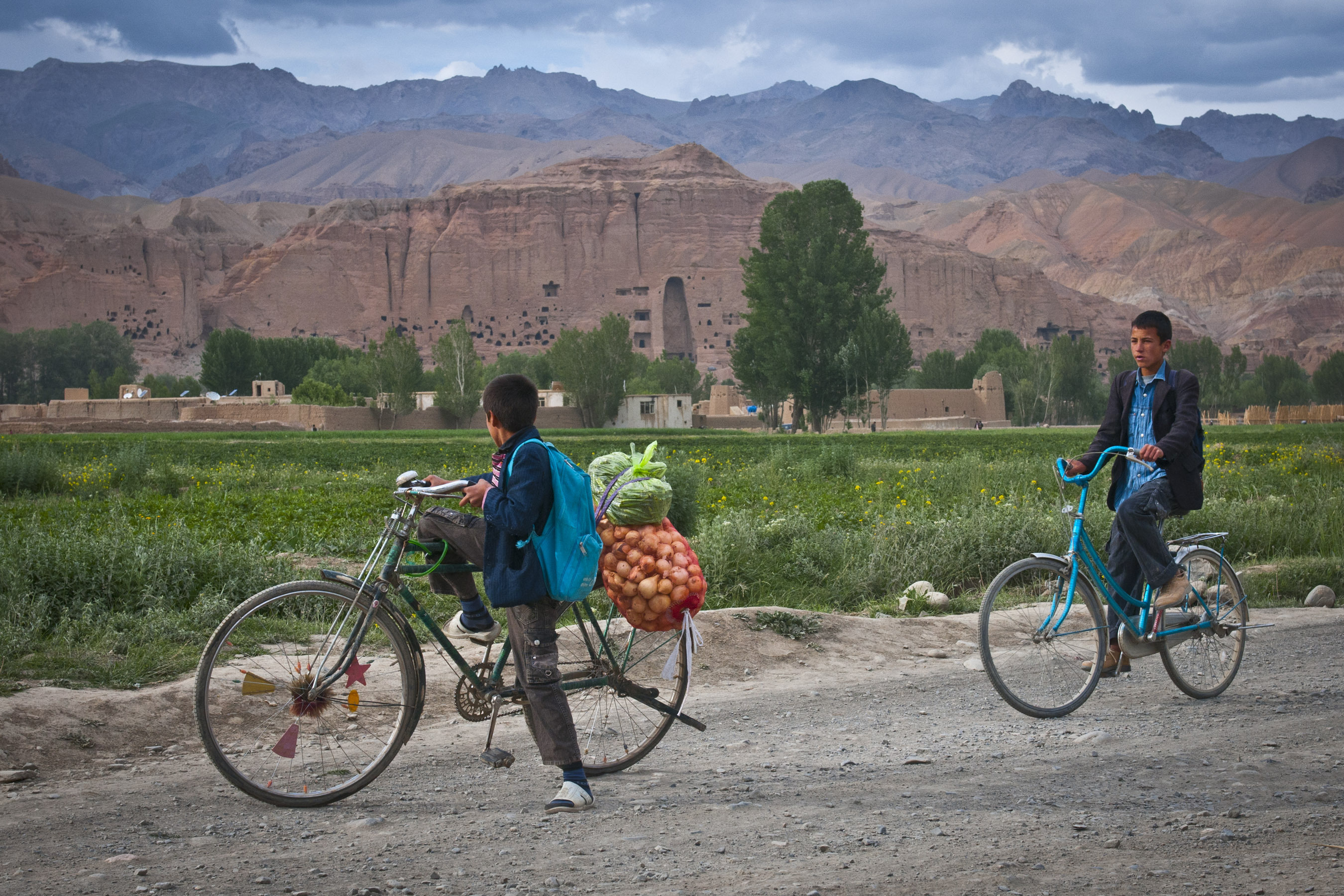
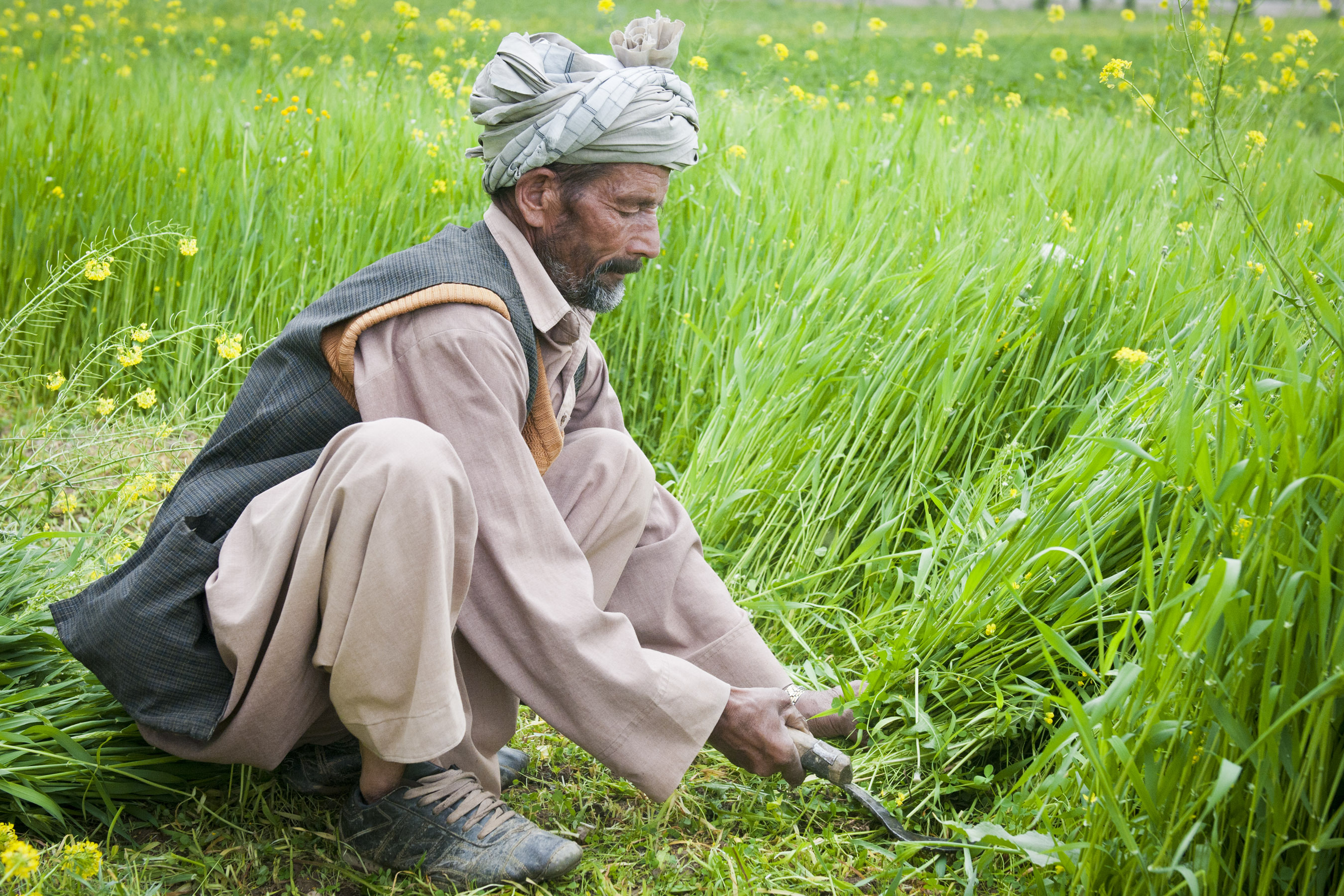
- Motto: بامیان بام دنیا "Bamyan, roof of the world"
- Location in Afghanistan
- Coordinates: 34°49′30″N 67°50′00″E
- Country: Afghanistan
- Province: Bamyan
- District: Bamyan
- Settled: 2800 BCE

Government
  - Type: Municipality

Area
  - Land: 35 km^{2} (14 sq mi)
- Elevation: 2,550 m (8,370 ft)

Population (2025)
  - Provincial capital: 103,909
  - Urban: 16,597
  - Rural: 87,312
- Time zone: UTC+04:30 (Afghanistan Time)
- Postal code: 16XX
- ISO 3166 code: AF-BIN

UNESCO World Heritage Site
- Type: Cultural
- Criteria: ii, iv, vi
- Designated: 1993
- Reference no.
- Region: Asia

Bamyan, also spelled as Bamiyan or Bamian (Dari, (Note: Dari pronunciation: [bɑː.miː.jɑ́ːn]) Pashto (Note: Pashto pronunciation: [bɑm.jɑn]): بامیان), is a city in central Afghanistan, serving as the capital of Bamyan Province. It is within the jurisdiction of Bamyan District and has an estimated population of 103,909 people. This makes Bamyan the largest municipality in Hazarajat. The Bamyan Airport is located in the middle of the city. It is surrounded by houses, businesses, schools and public parks. The Bamyan University is also near there. Band-e-Amir National Park is located around 2-hour drive to the west from the city's center. The driving distance between Bamyan and Kabul is approximately 180 km (110 mi). There is another road from Bamyan that leads east to Bagram in Parwan Province.

Bamyan sits at an altitude of about 8,366 ft (2,550 m) above sea level. The municipality is divided into four districts and has a total land area of 35 km^{2} (14 sq mi). There are about 4,435 dwelling units in the city. Bamyan marked the most westerly point of Buddhist expansion and was a crucial hub of trade for much of the second millennium CE. It was a place where East met West and its archaeology reveals a blend of Greek, Turkic, Persian, Chinese, and Indian influences. The city has been one of Afghanistan's most touristic places.

Bamyan is referred to by some as the "Shining Light" and "Valley of Gods". In 2008 the world's oldest oil paintings were found in Bamyan Valley caves. There are several tourist attractions near the city, including the destroyed Buddhas of Bamyan, which were carved into cliffs on the north side of Bamyan city in the 3rd to 5th centuries CE, dating them to the pre-Islamic Hephthalite rule. They were part of a UNESCO World Heritage Site and were destroyed by the Taliban in 2001. Other tourist attractions close to the city include Shahr-e-Gholghola and Zuhak. At the end of the 10th century, there was a Buddhist culture in which several thousand Buddhist monks lived in caves carved into the mountain. The 53 meters known as the Salsal and 35 meters known as Shahmama were the high-standing Buddha statues and best-known monuments left by the Buddhists. Furthermore, there are several cultural sites left from both the Buddhist and the later Islamic era of the valley.

Bamyan joined the UNESCO Creative Cities Network as City of Crafts and Folk Arts in 2017 and joined the UNESCO Global Network of Learning Cities in 2018.. "UNESCO noted the Bamiyan Valley is the most monumental expression of western Buddhism". Bamyan is now listed by UNESCO as a World Heritage Site in Danger. On 15 August 2021, it was seized again by Taliban fighters, becoming the twenty-ninth provincial capital to be captured as part of the wider 2021 Taliban offensive.

== Name ==
The name "Bamyan" is derived from Middle Persian Bamikan.

== Geography ==
Bamyan is a strategic city in the central part of Afghanistan. Sitting at an altitude of 2,550 m (8,370 ft) above sea level, it connects by a road network with Aybak to the north, Bagram to the east, Kabul to the southeast, and Firozkoh to the west. Bamyan is administratively divided into four city districts (nahias) and surrounded by vast farmlands. Its total land area is 35 km^{2} (14 sq mi) or (3,539 ha (8,750 acres)).

The high valley is about 230 km (140 mi) northwest of Kabul and separates the Hindu Kush mountain range from the Koh-i-Baba mountains. On the north side, there is an approximately 1.5 km (0.93 mi) long, high, almost vertical sandstone cliff that was formed by a glacier. The Buddha statues and most of the caves in the valley were carved into this rock face. In the valley itself and on the slopes, there are numerous ruins from earlier times.

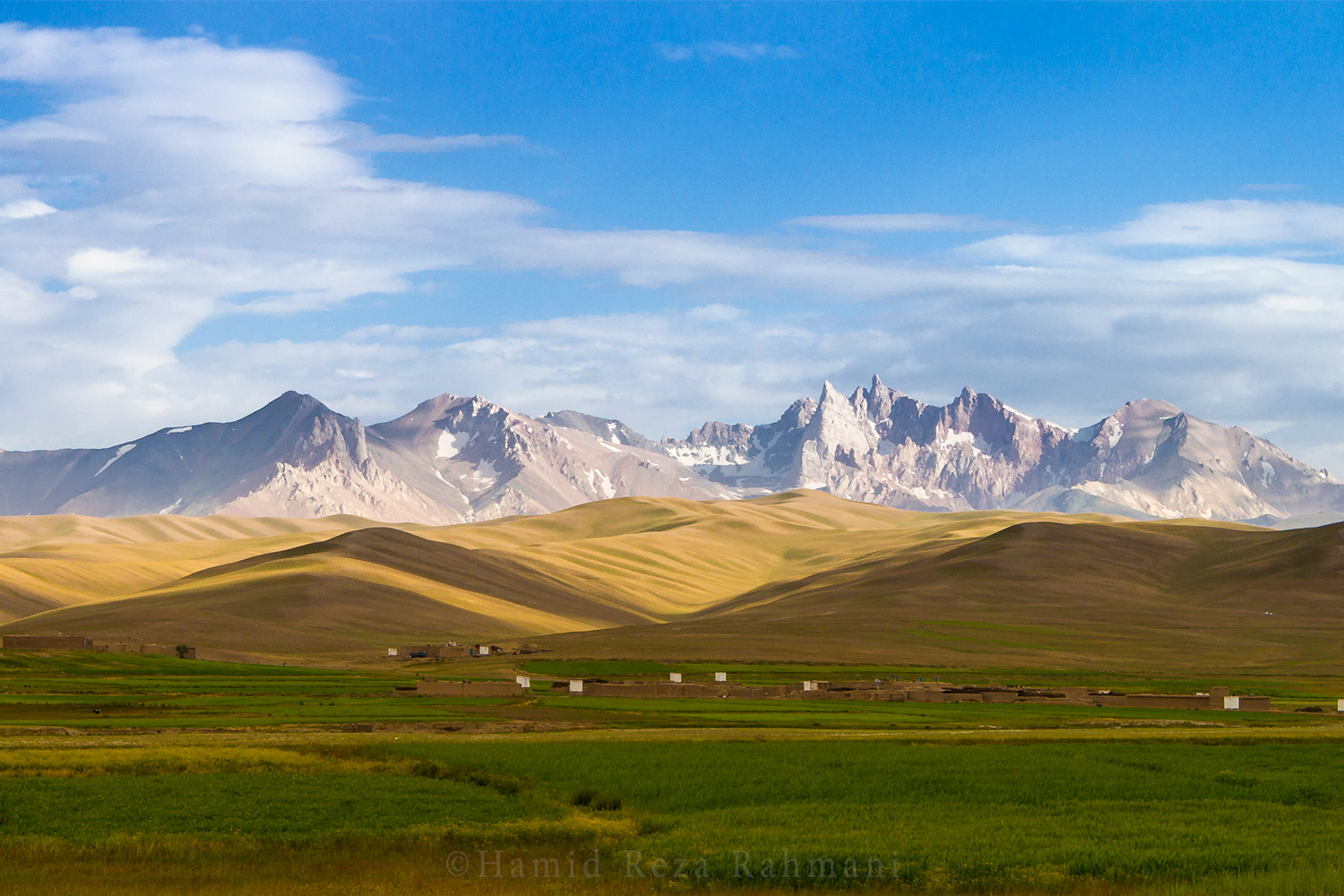
Koh-i-Baba mountains

Situated on the ancient Silk Route, the city was at the crossroads between the four parts of Asia when trade between Central Asia, China, India and the Middle East passed through it. The Hunas made it their capital in the 5th century. Because of the cliff of the Buddhas, the ruins of the Monk's caves, Shahr-e Gholghola ('City of Sighs'), the ruins of an ancient city destroyed by Genghis Khan during the Siege of Bamyan, and its local scenery, it is one of the most visited places in Afghanistan. The Shahr-e Zuhak mound ten miles south of the valley is the site of a citadel that guarded the city, and the ruins of an acropolis could be found there as recently as the 1990s.

Mountains cover ninety percent of the province, and the cold, long winter, lasting for six months, brings temperatures of three to twenty degrees Celsius below zero. Transportation facilities are increasing, but sparse. Notably, Bamyan is now connected by road to several neighboring provinces. The connection between Bamyan and Maidan Shar – 136 km (85 mi) long – makes it possible to reach Kabul in a 2-hour drive. The connection is almost completed missing just 15 km (9.3 mi) of paving.

== Climate ==
Bamyan has a warm-summer continental Mediterranean climate (Köppen Dsb), with freezing winters and very warm, dry summers. Precipitation mostly falls in late winter and spring

Climate data for Bamyan
Month	Jan	Feb	Mar	Apr	May	Jun	Jul	Aug	Sep	Oct	Nov	Dec	Year
Record high °C (°F)	12.0 (53.6)	12.5 (54.5)	20.6 (69.1)	28.7 (83.7)	29.4 (84.9)	31.2 (88.2)	33.2 (91.8)	32.2 (90.0)	31.4 (88.5)	26.2 (79.2)	20.6 (69.1)	13.0 (55.4)	33.2 (91.8)
Mean daily maximum °C (°F)	1.0 (33.8)	2.0 (35.6)	7.9 (46.2)	15.6 (60.1)	19.9 (67.8)	24.1 (75.4)	26.3 (79.3)	26.1 (79.0)	22.9 (73.2)	17.4 (63.3)	11.0 (51.8)	5.1 (41.2)	14.9 (58.9)
Daily mean °C (°F)	−6.4 (20.5)	−4.8 (23.4)	1.4 (34.5)	8.6 (47.5)	12.4 (54.3)	16.3 (61.3)	18.4 (65.1)	17.4 (63.3)	12.8 (55.0)	7.8 (46.0)	1.6 (34.9)	−2.8 (27.0)	6.9 (44.4)
Mean daily minimum °C (°F)	−10.1 (13.8)	−6.1 (21.0)	−3.8 (25.2)	2.9 (37.2)	5.7 (42.3)	8.5 (47.3)	10.0 (50.0)	8.8 (47.8)	4.2 (39.6)	0.0 (32.0)	−4.9 (23.2)	−8.6 (16.5)	0.5 (33.0)
Record low °C (°F)	−30.5 (−22.9)	−28.4 (−19.1)	−21.2 (−6.2)	−6.5 (20.3)	−2.5 (27.5)	0.6 (33.1)	5.4 (41.7)	3.0 (37.4)	−2.6 (27.3)	−7.9 (17.8)	−14.5 (5.9)	−25 (−13)	−30.5 (−22.9)
Average precipitation mm (inches)	43.5 (1.71)	59 (2.3)	81.4 (3.20)	84.8 (3.34)	59.1 (2.33)	9.5 (0.37)	3.1 (0.12)	1.7 (0.07)	3 (0.1)	11.8 (0.46)	28.9 (1.14)	39.5 (1.56)	425.3 (16.7)
Average rainy days	0	0	2	7	6	1	1	0	0	2	2	0	21
Average snowy days	5	7	6	2	0	0	0	0	0	0	1	3	24
Average relative humidity (%)	43	54	52	52	52	46	45	45	43	44	48	52	48
Mean monthly sunshine hours	196.7	174.6	210.7	239.4	—	356.9	372.9	357.8	325.3	276.7	245.5	198.0	—
Source 1: Hong Kong Observatory
Source 2: NOAA (1960–1983)

== History ==
The city of Bamyan was part of the Kushan Empire in the early centuries CE. After the Kushan Empire fell to the Sassanids, Bamyan became part of the Kushansha, vassals to the Sassanids. The Buddhist pilgrim Fa Xian visited Bamyan in the fifth century and recorded that the king summoned the monks of the region for vows and prayers. Fa Xian also records landslides and avalanches in the mountains and the presence of snow during winter and summer. This latter statement suggests climatic change which could have contributed to the historical and economic importance of the area for the years to come. Another Buddhist traveller, Xuanzang, passed through Bamyan in the seventh century. His record shows that the Bamyan Buddhas and cave monastery near it were already built. He also records that Buddhism in the region was in decay with the people being "hard and uncultivated".

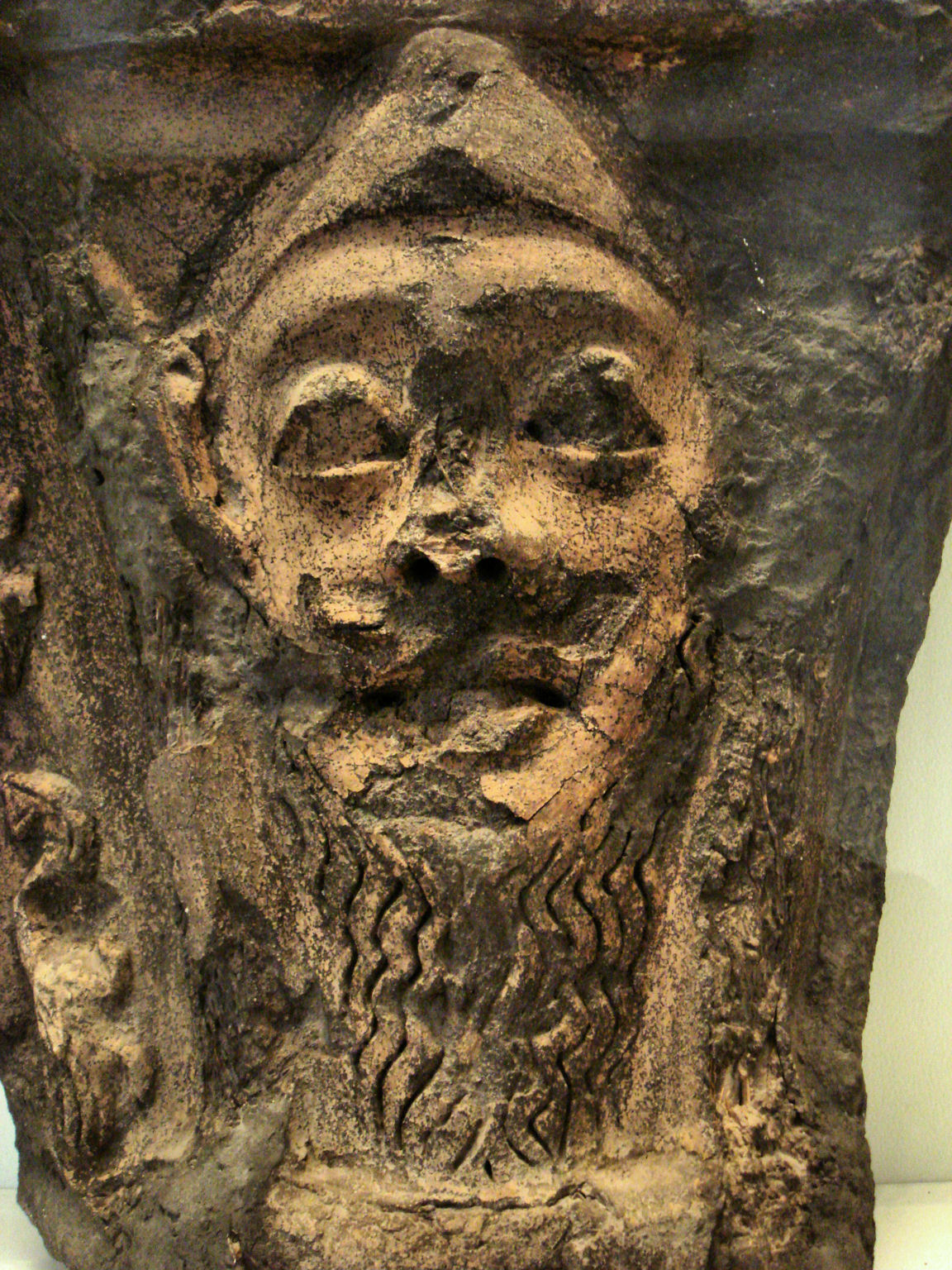
Statue of a bearded man with cap, probably Scythian, Bamyan c. 3–4th century.

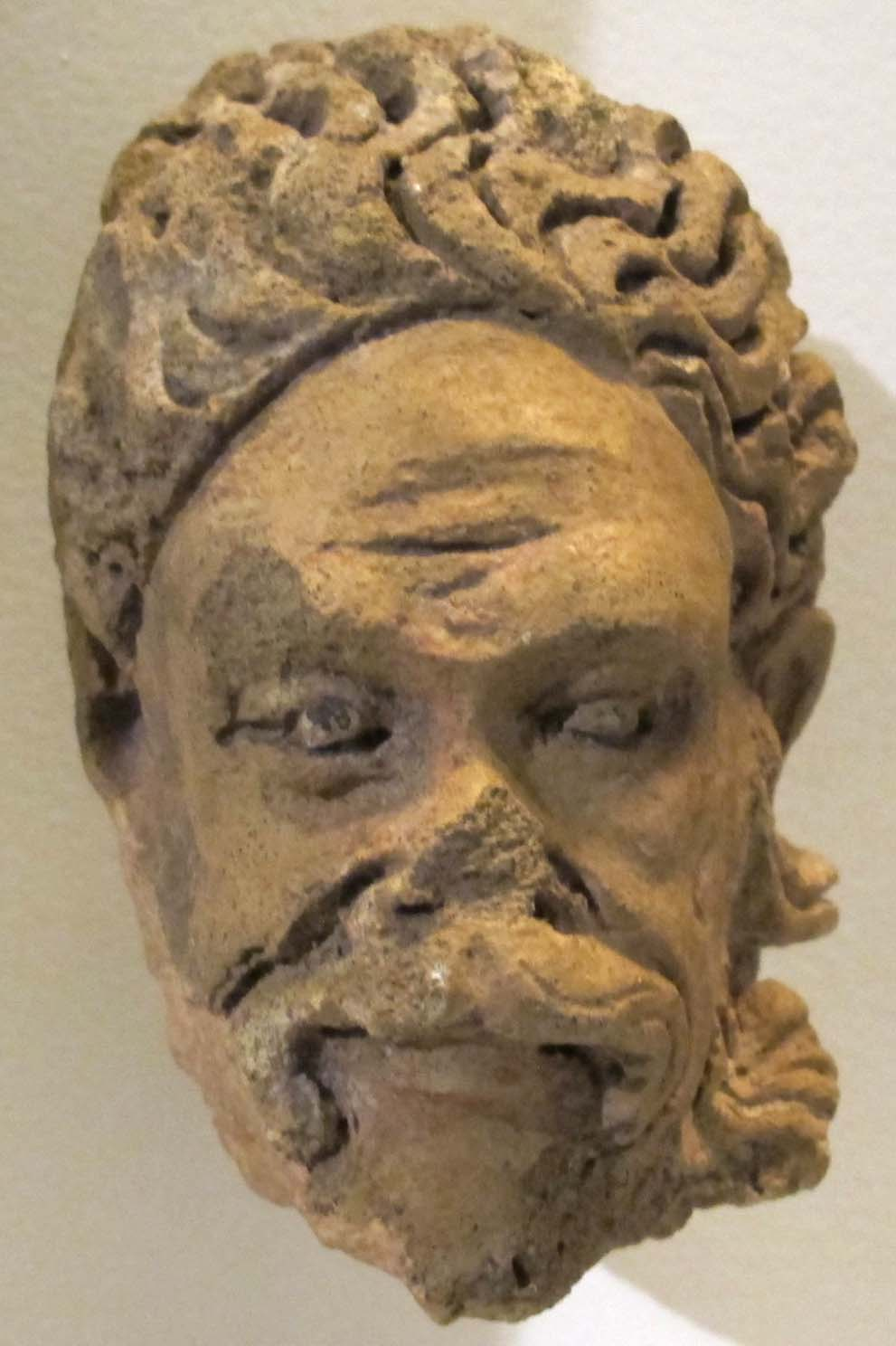
Head, from Bamyan c. 6–7 century.

The Hephthalites conquered Bamyan in the 5th century. After their Khanate was destroyed by the Sassanids and Turks in 565, Bamyan became the capital of the small Kushano-Hephthalite kingdom until 870, when it was conquered by the Saffarids. Favoured by its location on one of the main trade routes from the West to China and India, the valley was of great strategic importance. It became a stop for trade caravans, a well-known artistic site and was also a major Buddhist center for centuries. It later fell to the Ghaznavids in the 11th century. Bamyan was Islamized under the reign of Sultan Mahmud. This was around the time of the first millennium AD. At that time, the center of the city of Bamyan was moved from the northwest of the valley, where the cliff with the Buddha statues is located, further to the southeast. Some of the fortifications in the valley also date from this period. During the Ghurids rule, Bamyan was the capital of a large kingdom for about 60 years, namely from 1155 to 1212, which stretched north to the Oxus River (today's Amu Darya). In 1221 the city and its population were said to be completely wiped out by Genghis Khan during the siege of Bamyan. It is claimed that he was taking revenge for his slain grandson. Bamyan was unable to recover from this event for a long time. Even decades later, the city was still devastated, according to a report by a Persian historian. Several decades passed before a town appeared in the valley again, but it could only acquire regional importance. The Qarlughids established their capital in the city soon thereafter. There is some evidence that Bamyan was somewhat populated and reconstructed during the Timurid period in the 15th century.

From the age of the Timurids, there is said to have been a city again in Bamyan. However, the general decline in coast-to-coast trade during this time meant that the city could no longer grow to its old size and could no longer achieve supra-regional importance.

Bamyan is also mentioned again in the history books during the Mughal Empire, especially in connection with Aurangzeb, who had the 53 m tall Buddha statue shot at with cannons during his looting.

European explorer William Moorcroft is reported to have visited Bamyan in 1824. About two decades later the region was under conflict because of the First Anglo-Afghan War when the British routed Dost Mohammad Khan and his forces.

=== Buddhas of Bamyan ===
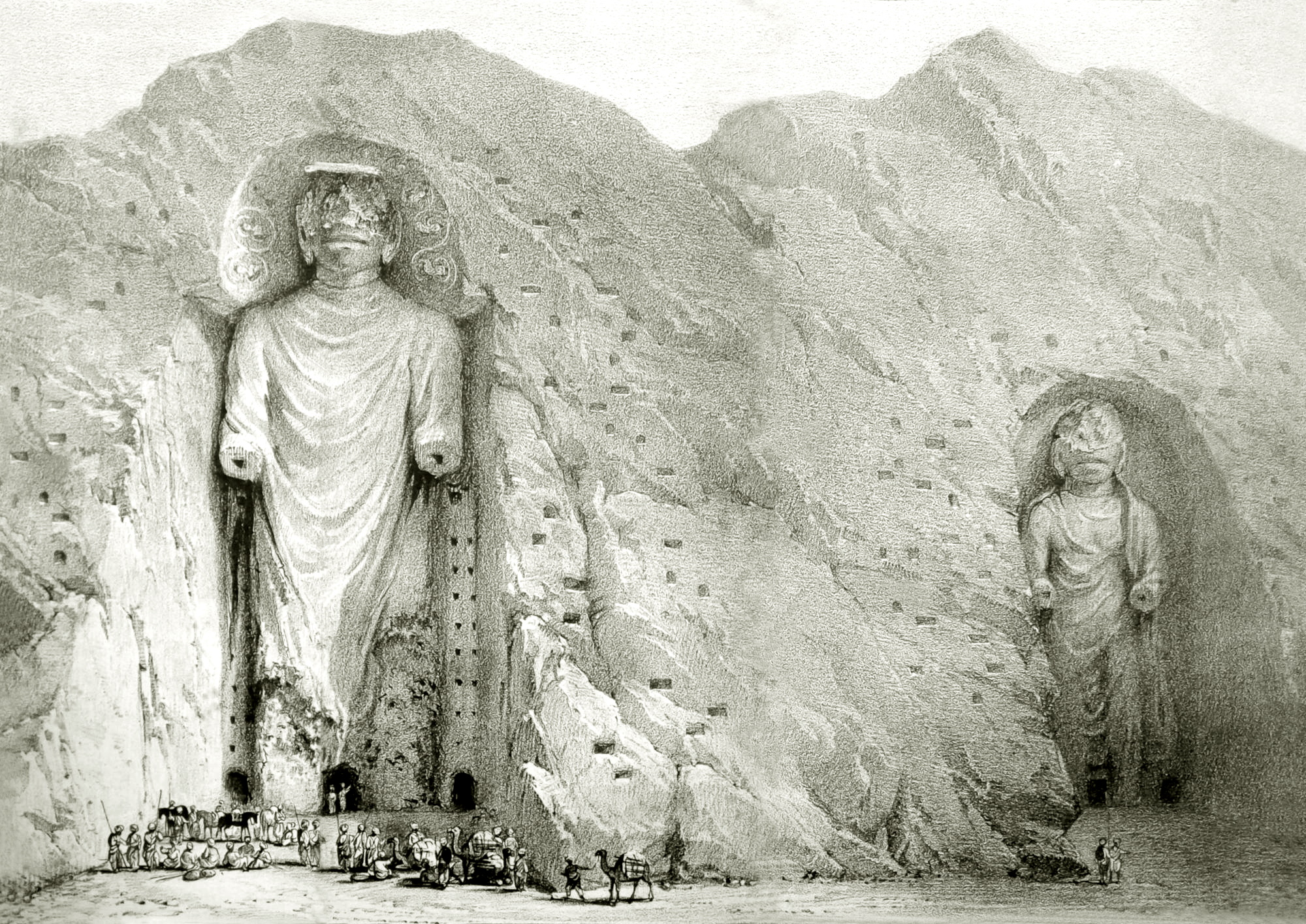
Drawing of the Buddhas of Bamyan by Alexander Burnes, as he saw them during his visit in Bamyan in 1832

The western Buddha niche filled with scaffolding as of 2025

Ashoka, the ruler of the ancient Indian Maurya dynasty, according to an old inscription, was sent in 261 BC to convert the area. This was just before the Greco-Bactrian kingdom declared independence in the northern Hindu Kush region.

Under the rule of the Kushana dynasty, Buddhism gradually established itself in the Hindu Kush area. Between the 2nd and 4th centuries AD, a number of Buddhist sites arose along the trade routes at that. Bamyan itself was to become the largest and most famous of these Buddhist sites. However, the exact point in time when Buddhism found its way into Bamyan itself is not known.

This Buddhist art was significantly influenced by the earlier Gandhara culture, which was developed further in the south, and the Indian Gupta culture was the result of this cultural creation being unique of its kind. The Gandhara culture was already in retreat or largely collapsed when Buddhism experienced a revival here.

The two large Buddha statues were constructed on the large rock facing the north side of the valley in the 6th century. Corridors and galleries were carved into the rock around the figures and hundreds of prayer halls and caves were created, some of which were decorated with rich wall paintings.

The number of caves currently present in Bamyan is estimated to be around 1,000. The time of origin is dated to the period from 450 to 850 AD. Some of the murals have been identified as the oldest known oil paintings in the world, dating to the 7th century. An earlier chronicle estimates the number at 12,000 caves, a number that is exaggerated for the Bamyan Valley alone, but seems appropriate for the entire region, including around 50 km (31 mi) of surrounding valleys. The oil painting of Bamyan Buddha is related to the 5th to 9th century and those paintings were made of oil, hundreds of years before the technique was "invented" in Europe. The scientists discovered that 12 out of the 50 caves were painted with oil painting technique, using perhaps walnut and poppy seed drying oils.

In late ancient times, the adjoining room was mainly in the hands of tribes who were counted among the Iranian Huns and were in conflict with the Sassanid Empire. After 560, the Gök Turks became the dominant power in Transoxania.

Xuanzang, a Chinese monk, visited the valley around 630 AD and was welcomed by King Bamyan. He spent around 15 days in the valley and described the Buddha statues present in the valley, as well as the location of some temples, whereby his information was confirmed by science as very exact. Based on further statements by Xuanzang, it is assumed that at least half of the one thousand caves known today must have been inhabited. Almost a hundred years later, in 727, the Korean monk Hyecho (Hui Chao) described Bamyan as an independent and powerful kingdom, despite the presence of Muslim-Arab troops in the north and south of the region.

The dome of one of the Buddhist caves in Bamyan, Afghanistan 2025

On the cliff face of a mountain nearby, three colossal statues were carved 4,000 feet apart. One of them was 175 feet (53 m) high standing statue of Buddha, the world's tallest. The ancient statue was carved during the Kushan period in the fifth century. At one time, two thousand monks meditated in caves among the sandstone cliffs. The caves were also a big tourist attraction before the long series of wars in Afghanistan. The world's earliest oil paintings have been discovered in caves behind the destroyed statues. Scientists from the European Synchrotron Radiation Facility have confirmed that the oil paintings, probably of either walnut or poppy seed oil, are present in 12 of the 50 caves dating from the 5th to 9th century. The murals typically have a white base layer of a lead compound, followed by an upper layer of natural or artificial pigments mixed with either resins or walnut or poppy seed drying oils. Possibly, the paintings may be the work of artists who traveled on the Silk Road.

=== Recent history ===
During the late 1990s, Bamyan became the center of combat between Taliban and Hezbe Wahdat supporters. The city is known to some as the center of Daizangi. The caves at the base of the Buddha statues were used by the Taliban for storing weapons. After they fled in late 2001, civilians made their homes in the caves. They discovered a fantastic collection of Buddhist statues as well as jars holding more than ten thousand fragments of ancient Buddhist manuscripts, a large part of which is now in the Schøyen Collection. This has created a sensation among scholars, and the find has been compared with the discovery of the Dead Sea Scrolls.

From 2003 to 2013, a foreign military base was established in Bamyan. It was first occupied by U.S. forces and after April 2003 by New Zealand Defence Force personnel which made up the Provincial Reconstruction Team. The 34th Division in the area, part of the 4th Corps, was affiliated with Karim Khalili. The city became one of the first pilot centers for the Afghan New Beginnings Programme of Disarmament, demobilization and reintegration. The disarmament began in July 2004. After NATO-led forces and their supporters fled from Afghanistan, the Islamic Emirate of Afghanistan returned to power and took control of Bamyan.

== Demographics ==
The Bamyan municipality has an estimated population of 103,909 people, while the entire Bamyan province has an estimated population of 440,614 people. The Majority of the population consists Hazaras who follow Shia Islam and generally use their native Hazaragi dialects of Persian language when communicating with each other, but they are fully fluent in Dari and many of those who travel a lot are also fluent in Pashto. In 2015 there were around 4,435 dwellings in the city.

== Economy ==
The people of Bamyan are mostly villagers and involved in agriculture, trade, transport, security, and tourism. Many go to work in Kabul or other Afghan cities. One of the major problems in the area is shortage of electricity.

Bamyan's main crops are wheat, barley, mushung, and baquli, grown in spring. When crops are damaged by unusually harsh weather, residents herd their livestock down to Ghazni and Maidan Wardak Province provinces to barter them for food.

== Education ==
There are a number of public schools in the city. The Bamyan University was established in 1996. It is the largest public university in the city, providing higher education to over 5,500 students.

== Healthcare ==
There are several hospitals and clinics in and around the city. One is the Bamyan Provincial Hospital and the other is a new 120-bed Khomeini Hospital.

== Special events ==
=== Art bazaar ===
The art bazaar is a place where local women display and sell their handicrafts to tourists who visit the city. Carpets, rugs, felts, embroidery, pottery and other local products can be found in there. The bazaar had between 300 and 400 shops in the past.

=== Festivals ===
Dambura is one of the famous traditional music equipment which is guitar-like is made from mulberry wood, which is popular and largely used by classic singers and folklore, musicians mainly played in central. Traditional Dambura festival used to held each year in a bid to help improve the tourism industry of Bamyan province.

The potato flower festival (guli kachalo in Dari) is organized by farmers and government officials to promote local Product. Celebrated for the first time in 2017, people made many different types of food from only potatoes.

=== Sports ===
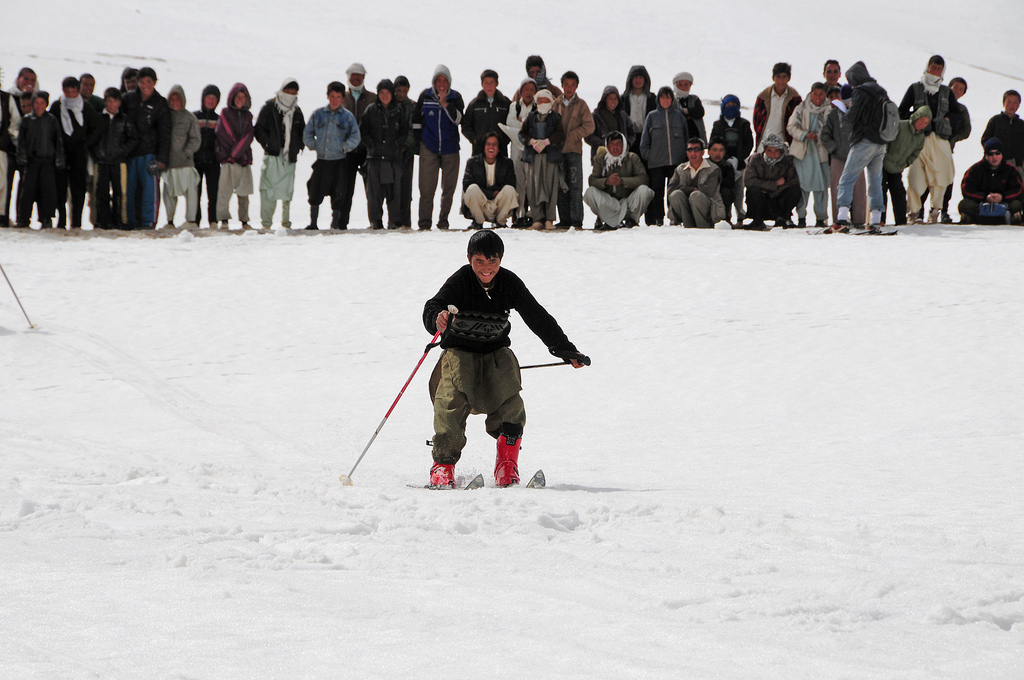
Skiing

Cricket and football are the most popular sports in Afghanistan. Other sports the people of Bamyan enjoy are futsal, volleyball, wrestling, taekwondo, and bodybuilding.

Ski championships have been held in the Bamyan area since 2011. It is a one-time race with a mass start. The first skiers were equipped with modern equipment in 2011. However, locals also used replicas of skis to move around in the mountains, for example in search of runaway pets.

On 4 November 2016, a marathon took place in which women athletes participated for the first time.

== Historical sites ==
The numerous remains of monasteries, painted caves, statues and fortifications have been on the UNESCO list of world cultural heritage since 2003. At the same time, they were also entered on the Red List of World Heritage in Danger.

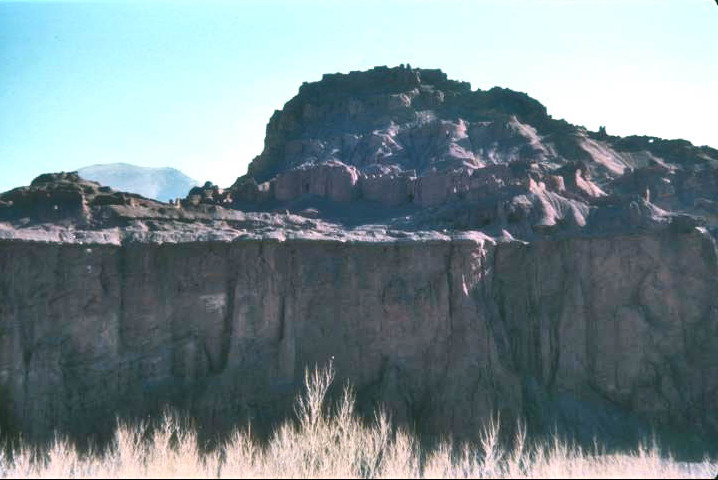
Shahr-e Zuhak

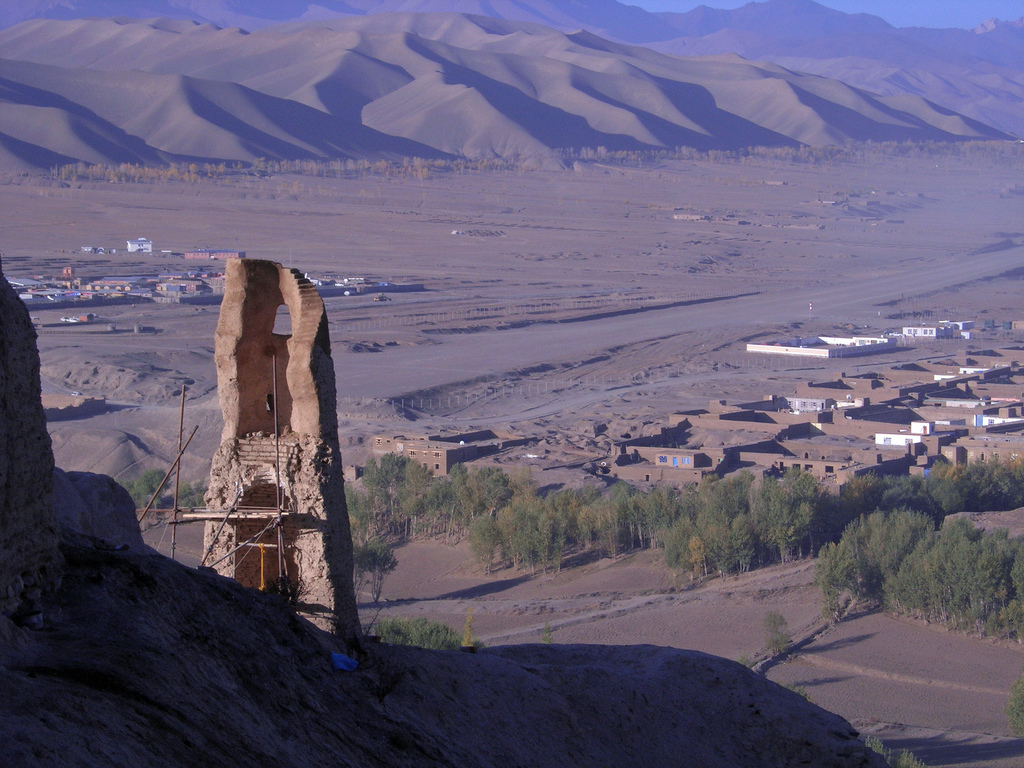
Restoration work in 2008

The protected world heritage sites include in detail:

- The famous Bamyan Buddha statues from the 6th century. Around the niches of the two 53 and 35 meter high, destroyed statues, at least 900 caves are carved into the rock, decorated with frescoes and stucco work.
- The Islamic fortress Schahr-i Suhak about 15 km east of the cliff from the time of the Ghaznavids and the Ghurids (10th to 13th centuries).
- The remains of Qallai Kaphari about 12 km east of the cliff with protective walls, towers, and castles.
- The fortified castle Schahr-e Gholghola on a hill in the middle of the valley (6th to 10th centuries).
- The Kakrak valley about 3 km southeast of the cliff contains over 100 caves from the 6th to 13th centuries, the remains of a 10 meter high Buddha statue and an altar with paintings from the Sassanid Empire.
- The caves in the Foladi Valley about 2 km southwest of the cliff, especially the ornate Qoul-i Akram and Kalai Ghamai caves.

== International sister cities ==
- Gering, Nebraska, U.S.
- Langley, British Columbia, Canada
- Porirua, New Zealand

== See also ==
- List of cities in Afghanistan
- Tourism in Afghanistan
