= Abdullah Sarhadi =

Governor of Bamyan, Afghanistan

Mullah Abdullah Sarhadi
- ملا عبدالله سرحدی

Governor of Bamyan
- Incumbent
- Assumed office 7 November 2021
- Prime Minister: Hasan Akhund
- Emir: Hibatullah Akhundzada
- Preceded by: Maulvi Mohammad Anas Azizi

Mullah Abdullah Sarhadi (Pashto: ملا عبدالله سرحدی) is an Afghan Taliban politician who is currently serving as governor of Bamyan province since 7 November 2021. He belongs to a network of Taliban commanders related to Zabul province. Before the fall of Taliban pre-2001, he has also served as commander of the special units during the Islamic Emirate of Afghanistan (1996–2001).
