= Habiba Sarābi =

Afghan Hazara politician (born 1956)

Habiba Sarābi حبیبه سرابی
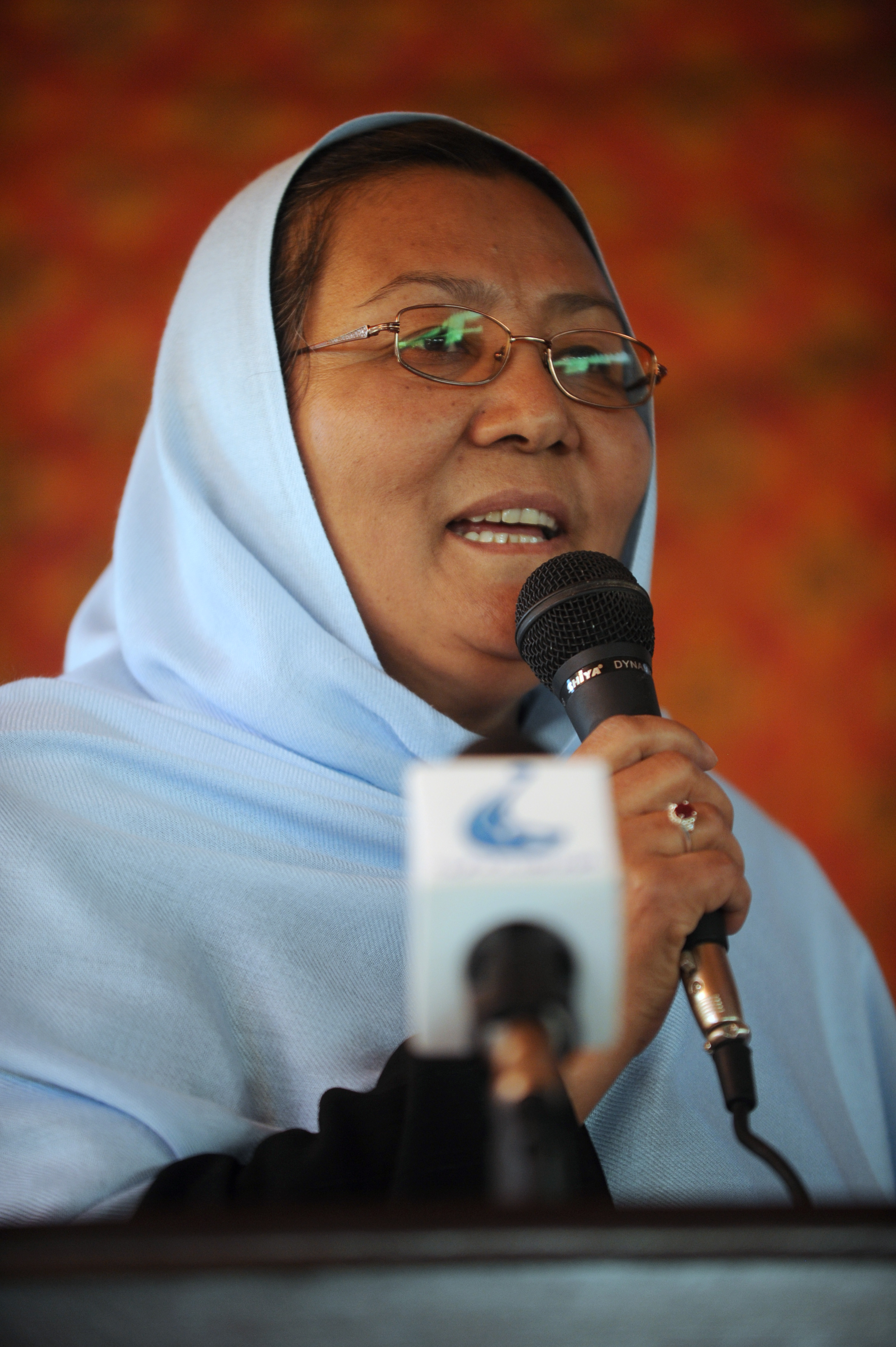
- Sarābi in April 2011

Governor of Bamyan Province
- In office 23 March 2005 – 14 October 2013
- Preceded by: Mohammad Rahim Aliyar
- Succeeded by: Ghulam Ali Wahdat

2nd Minister of Women's Affairs
- In office July 2002 – December 2004
- Preceded by: Sima Samar
- Succeeded by: Massouda Jalal

Personal details
- Born: Habiba; 1956 (age 69–70) Sarab, Ghazni Province, Kingdom of Afghanistan
- Party: Truth and Justice
- Children: 3
- Parent: Abdul Hamid (father)

Dr. Habiba Sarābi (Dari: حبیبه سرابی) (born 1956) is a hematologist, politician, and reformer of the reconstruction of Afghanistan after the Taliban first took power. In 2005, she was appointed Governor of Bamyan Province - the first Afghan woman to become a provincial governor. She had served as Afghanistan's Minister of Women's Affairs and as Minister of Culture and Education. Sarabi was instrumental in promoting women's rights and representation and environmental issues. She belongs to the ethnic Hazara people of Afghanistan. Her last name is sometimes spelled Sarobi.

== Biography ==
Sarābi was born in Sarāb, Ghazni Province and spent her youth traveling around the country with her father. She was the only daughter of five children so she learned to stand up for her rights. She later moved to Kabul to attend high school and study medicine at university. After graduating in 1987, she was awarded a fellowship by the World Health Organization and moved to India to complete her studies in hematology.

During the first Taliban rule in Afghanistan, Dr. Sarabi and her children fled to Peshawar, Pakistan, but returned frequently in secret. Her husband stayed behind in Kabul to care for his family. She also worked underground as a teacher for girls, both secretly in Afghanistan and refugee camps in Pakistan for Afghan refugees. In 1998, she joined the Afghan Institute of Learning and eventually became the General Manager. She was also the Vice President of Humanitarian Assistance for the Women and Children of Afghanistan.

She served as Afghanistan's Minister of Women's Affairs as well as Minister of Culture and Education. In 2005, she was appointed Governor of Bamyan Province by President Hamid Karzai, which made her the first Afghan woman to become a governor of any province in the country.

As governor, Sarabi has announced one of her focuses will be on tourism as a source of income. The province has historically been a source of Buddhist culture and was the location of the Buddhas of Bamiyan, the two ancient statues destroyed by the Taliban before the U.S. invasion of Afghanistan. However, Bamiyan remains one of the poorest and most under-developed provinces of Afghanistan, with a litany of problems including high rates of illiteracy and poverty.

In 2008 Time magazine included her in its list of Heroes of the Environment, partly for her work in establishing the Band-e Amir National Park of Afghanistan in Bamiyan. In 2013, she won the Ramon Magsaysay Award, and she was succeeded by governor by Ghulam Ali Wahdat.

She also received the N-Peace Award in 2016 for her tireless work to bring peace to Afghanistan and its focus on gender equality and women's empowerment.

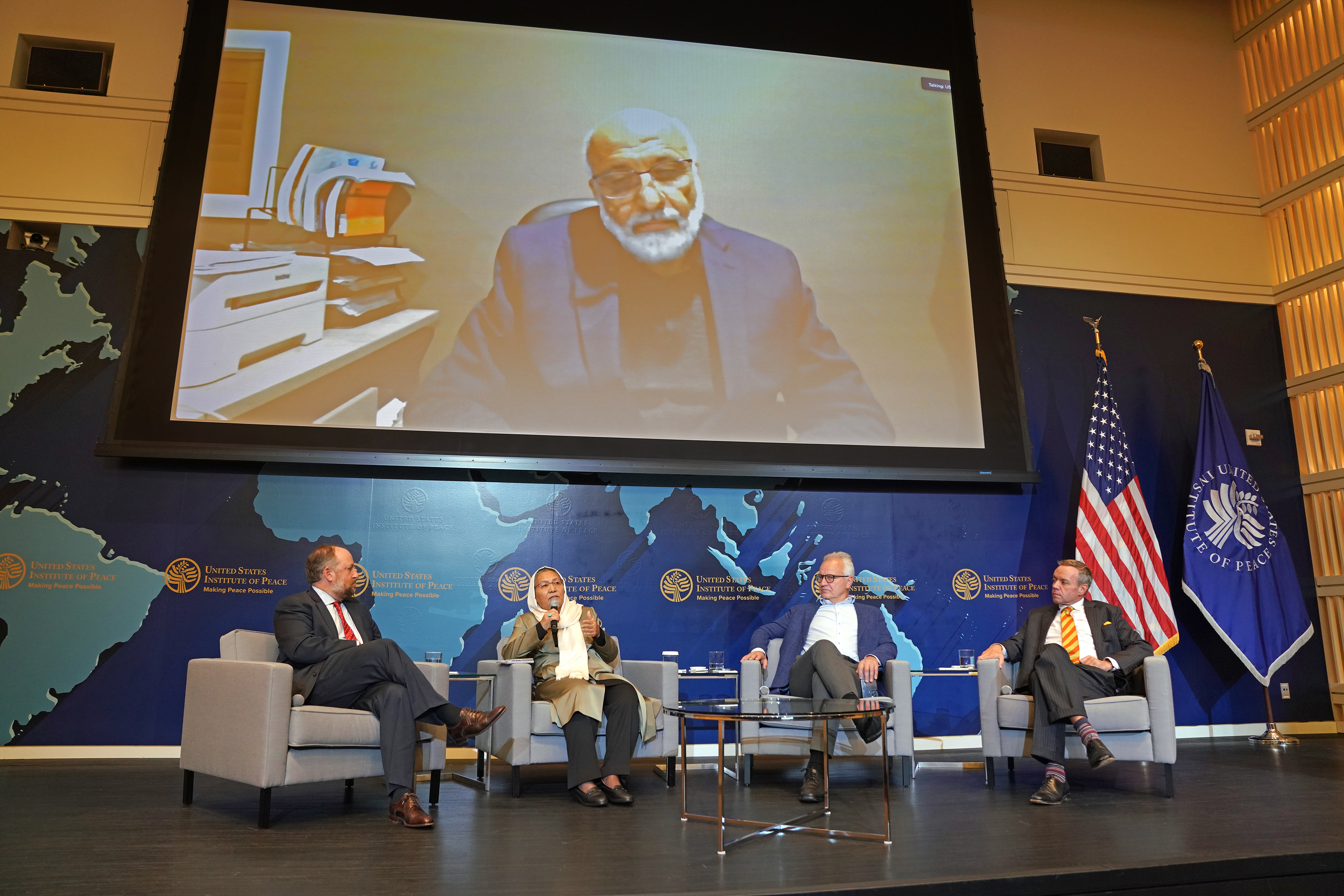
Discussing "Lessons from the Afghanistan Peace Process"

In 2020, Habiba Sarabi was a member of the Peace Negotiation Team of the Islamic Republic of Afghanistan.

On 8 March 2018, International Women's Day, she delivered a statement to the UN Security Council during the Open Debate on the United Nations Mission in Afghanistan.

In 2022 she was at a conference called "Lessons from the Afghanistan Peace Process" at the United States Institute of Peace. The conference asked why there had been no internal talks in Afghanistan between 2001 and 2021.

== See also ==
- List of Hazara people
- Azra Jafari

Preceded by Mohammad Rahim Aliyar	Governor of Bamyan, Afghanistan; 2005–2013	Succeeded by Ghulam Ali Wahdat

Preceded by Sima Samar	Minister of Women's Affairs, Afghanistan; 2002–2004	Succeeded by Massouda Jalal
