= List of governors of Bamyan =

This is a list of the governors of the province of Bamyan, Afghanistan.

== Governors of Bamyan Province ==
#	Governor	Period	Extra	Note
1	Mohammed Islam Mohammadi	27 September 1996; 17 November 2001		
2	Mohammad Rahim Aliyar	2003; 2005		
3	Habiba Sarabi	23 March 2005; 2013		
4	Ghulam Ali Wahdat	2013; 2015		
5	Muhammad Tahir Zaheer	2015 ?		
6	Maulvi Mohammad Anas Azizi	August 2021; 6 November 2021		
7	Abdullah Sarhadi	7 November 2021; Present		

== See also ==
- List of current governors of Afghanistan
