= Afghan Tatars =

Turkic ethnic group in Afghanistan

Total population
- Estimated 100,000–500,000 in 2023

Regions with significant populations
- Mostly in Afghan Turkestan with a smaller presence in other regions

Languages
- Afghan Tatar language (very small minority); Dari, Pashto, Uzbek, Turkmen

Religion
- Islam (Sunni majority, Shia minority)

Related ethnic groups
- Other Turkic peoples (especially other Tatars)

Afghan Tatars are a Turkic ethnic group in Afghanistan. A very small community speaks the Afghan Tatar language, while the vast majority speaks either Dari, Pashto, Uzbek, or Turkmen.

== History ==
Afghan Tatars claim descent from Tatar nomads who joined the Golden Horde and came to Afghanistan, first settling in Afghan Turkestan. They are primarily rural nomads, mostly residing in Samangan and Balkh in Afghan Turkestan. They are also found in various other provinces of Afghanistan. Local community leaders of the Afghan Tatars estimate that their population is around 100,000 people, although there hasn't been an Afghan census in decades. The Afghan Tatar language today is critically endangered, with only a very small minority speaking the language. The majority of Afghan Tatars adopted the language of the region they settled in, such as Dari, Pashto, Turkmen, Tajik or Uzbek. They have lived a remote and secluded life for the majority of their history.

The Afghan Tatars are mostly Hanafi Sunnis with a Shia minority. It has been reported that Afghan Tatars are moderate and do not support extremist or fundamentalist principles, although it is not certain. In the past, they have fought in many local conflicts. The Taliban has been opposed to Afghan Tatar traditions, having invaded the homes of Afghan Tatars, burning their books, and destroying much cultural heritage.

The Afghan Tatar community had a role in preserving the Buddhas of Bamiyan from the Taliban, which they considered a part of their heritage. Most Afghan Tatars followed Islam, although they were not strict. Afghan Tatars regularly celebrated the spring festival Yilgayaq, and honored their traditional saints.

Afghan Tatars never held high positions in the Afghan government, although during there was one Afghan Tatar MP before the 2021 Taliban takeover. Afghan Tatars were not recognized as an ethnic group in Afghanistan until March 2021. The National Statistics Office of the Islamic Republic of Afghanistan listed them as an ethnicity, which would allow them to have their ethnicity written on the new planned Afghan national ID cards, although the Taliban takeover happened after a few months and the ID cards never happened. The Afghan Tatar Cultural Foundation helped Afghan Tatars establish relations with ethnic Tatars over the world. They have ties to the World Tatar Congress of Tatarstan, Russia.

The Afghan Tatar Cultural Foundation's goal is to reconnect Afghan Tatars with their culture as well as revive the almost-extinct Afghan Tatar language, a Kipchak language closely related to the Tatar language. The World Tatar Congress helped them with much of it, and since 2005 have been inviting Afghan Tatar to Tatarstan to discuss issues. The World Tatar Congress assisted them in launching online education courses to revive their language since March 15, 2021. In January 2023, Danis Shakirov, with the World Tatar Congress, led a meeting in Kazan, where they spoke about what to do for Afghan Tatars. Shakirov stated that life for Afghan Tatars worsened after the Taliban takeover, and that the World Tatar Congress was planning on sending 1,000 Afghan Tatars to various universities in India and China who were willing to accept them. Shakirov also claimed that the World Tatar Congress has saved thousands of Afghan Tatars from starvation and promised to help save their language in the future.
