= Shahr-e-Gholghola =

Shahr-e-Gholghola (City of Screams) Gholghola City
- شهر غلغله (Dari)
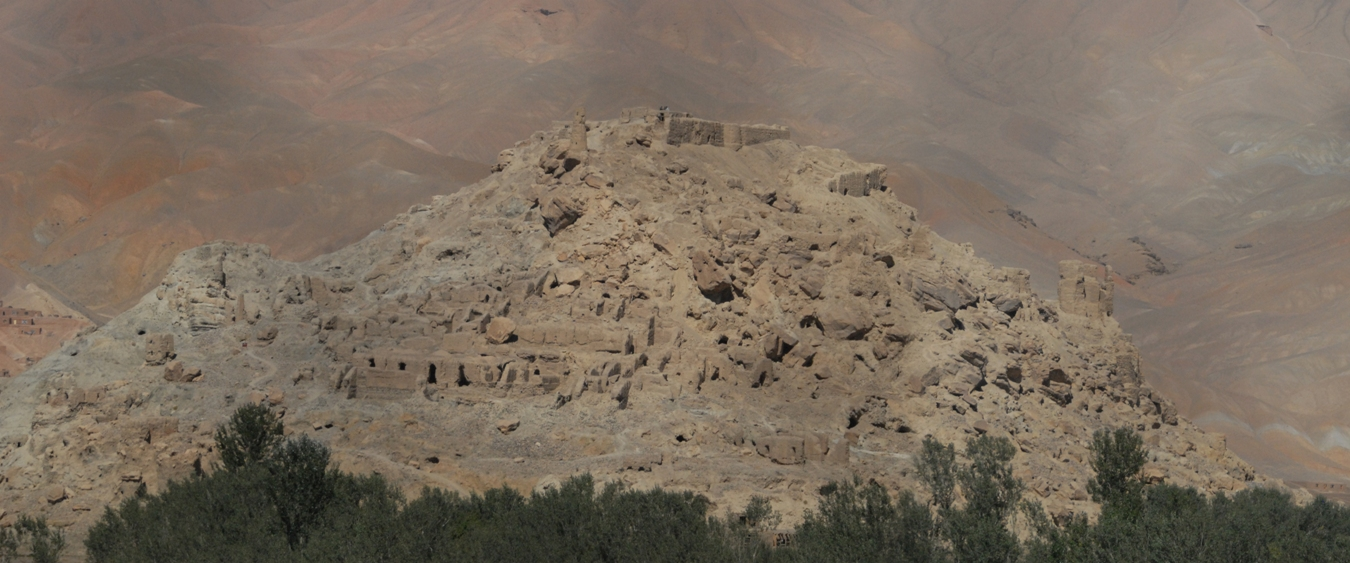
- Shahr-e-Gholghola or the 'City of Screams', Taken Sept 9, 2009 near Bamyan City, Bamyan Province, Afghanistan
- Interactive map of Shahr-e-Gholghola (City of Screams); Gholghola City
- 34.818813°N 67.838997°E
- Location: Bamyan, Afghanistan

Shahr-e-Gholghola or Gholghola City (Dari: شهر غلغله) (also City of Screams, City of Woe, City of Sorrows) is an archaeological site located near the town of Bamyan, Afghanistan.

The Siege of Bamyan took place here in 1221 during the Mongol pursuit of Jalal al-Din Mangburni, the last ruler of the Khwarazmian Empire. Mutukan, eldest son of Chagatai Khan and favourite grandson of Genghis Khan, was killed in battle by an arrow from the besieged walls, which led Genghis to massacre the population of the city and its surrounding region (the origin of the city's moniker "City of Woe").

== See also ==
- Shahr-e Zuhak, Bamyan
- Siege of Bamyan
