= Mushung =

Black bean, native to Afghanistan

Mushung is a small black bean. It is commonly boiled and sold on snack carts in Afghanistan, particularly in towns where Hazaras have presence. It is served cold with salt and vinegar based chutneys.
