= Bamyan Province =

Province of Afghanistan

Bamyan بامیان
- Province
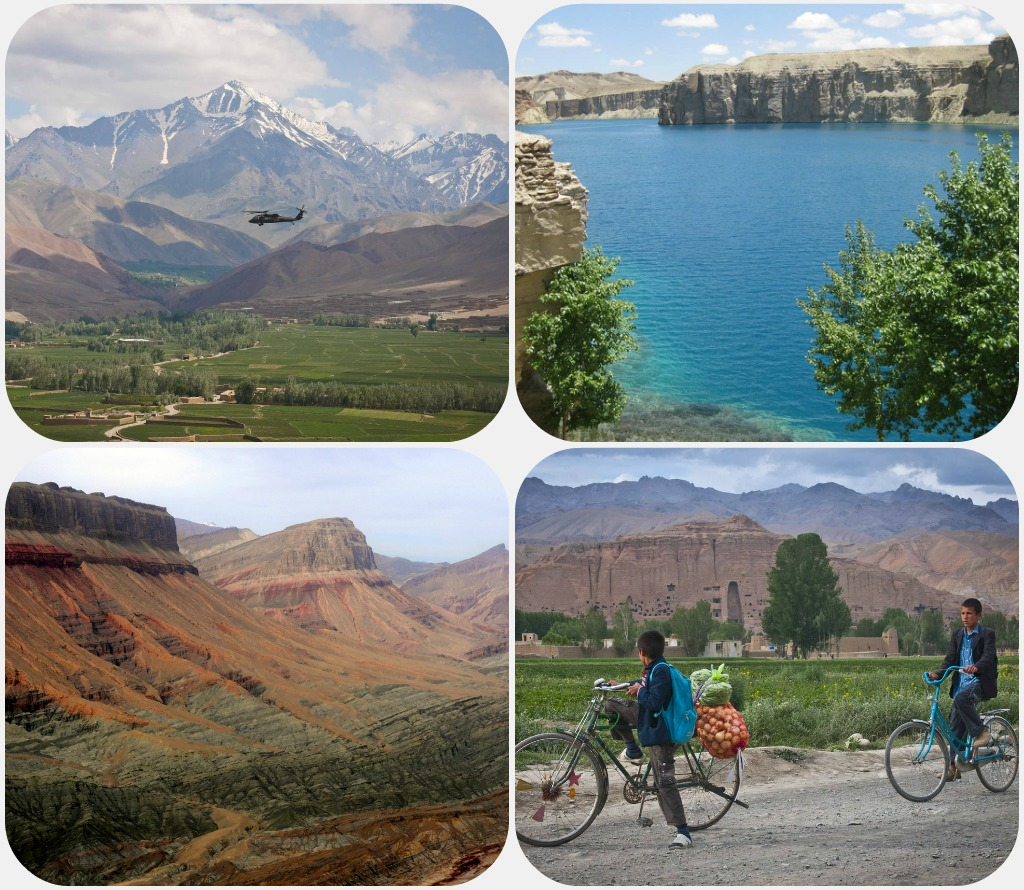
- Various places in Bamyan province

- The location of Bamiyan province within Afghanistan
- Coordinates (Capital): 34.75°N 67.25°E
- Country: Afghanistan
- Capital: Bamyan

Government
  - Governor: Abdullah Sarhadi
  - Deputy Governor: Atiqullah Atiq

Area
  - Total: 18,029.2 km^{2} (6,961.1 sq mi)

Population (2023)
  - Total: 522,205
  - Density: 28.9644/km^{2} (75.0175/sq mi)
- Time zone: UTC+4:30 (Afghanistan Time)
- Postal code: 16xx
- ISO 3166 code: AF-BAM
- Main languages: Persian

Bamyan (Pashto, (Note: Pashto pronunciation: [bɑm.jɑn, bɑ.mi.jɑn]) Dari: (Note: Dari pronunciation: [bɑː.miː.jɑ́ːn]) بامیان), also spelled Bamiyan, Bāmīān or Bāmyān, is one of the 34 provinces of Afghanistan with the city of Bamyan as its center, located in central parts of Afghanistan.

The terrain in Bamyan is mountainous or semi-mountainous, at the western end of the Hindu Kush mountains concurrent with the Himalayas. The province is divided into eight districts, with the town of Bamyan serving as its capital. The province has a population of about 495,557 and borders Samangan to the north, Baghlan, Parwan, and Maidan Wardak to the east, Ghazni and Daikundi to the south, and Ghor and Sar-e-Pol to the west. It is the largest province in the Central region of Afghanistan.

It was a center of commerce and Buddhism in the 4th and 5th centuries. In antiquity, central Afghanistan was strategically placed to thrive from the Silk Road caravans that crisscrossed the region, trading between the Roman Empire, Han dynasty, Central Asia, and South Asia. Bamyan was a stopping-off point for many travelers. It was here that elements of Greek and Buddhist art were combined into a unique classical style known as Greco-Buddhist art.

The province has several famous historical sites, including the now-destroyed Buddhas of Bamiyan, around which are more than 3,000 caves, the Band-e-Amir National Park, Dara-e-Ajhdar, Gholghola, and Zuhak ancient towns, the Feroz Bahar, Astopa, Klegan, Gaohargin, Kaferan, and Cheldukhtaran.

== History ==
=== Ancient history ===
Archaeological exploration done in the 20th century suggests that the geographical area of Afghanistan has been closely connected by culture and trade with its neighbors to the east, west, and north. Artifacts typical of the Paleolithic, Mesolithic, Neolithic, Bronze, and Iron Ages have been found in Afghanistan. Urban civilization is believed to have begun as early as 3000 BC, and the early city of Mundigak (near Kandahar in the south of the country) may have been a colony of the nearby Indus Valley civilization.

After 2000 BC, successive waves of semi-nomadic people from Central Asia began moving south into Afghanistan; among them were many Indo-European-speaking Indo-Iranians. These tribes later migrated further south to India, west to what is now Iran, and towards Europe via the area north of the Caspian Sea. The region as a whole was called Ariana.

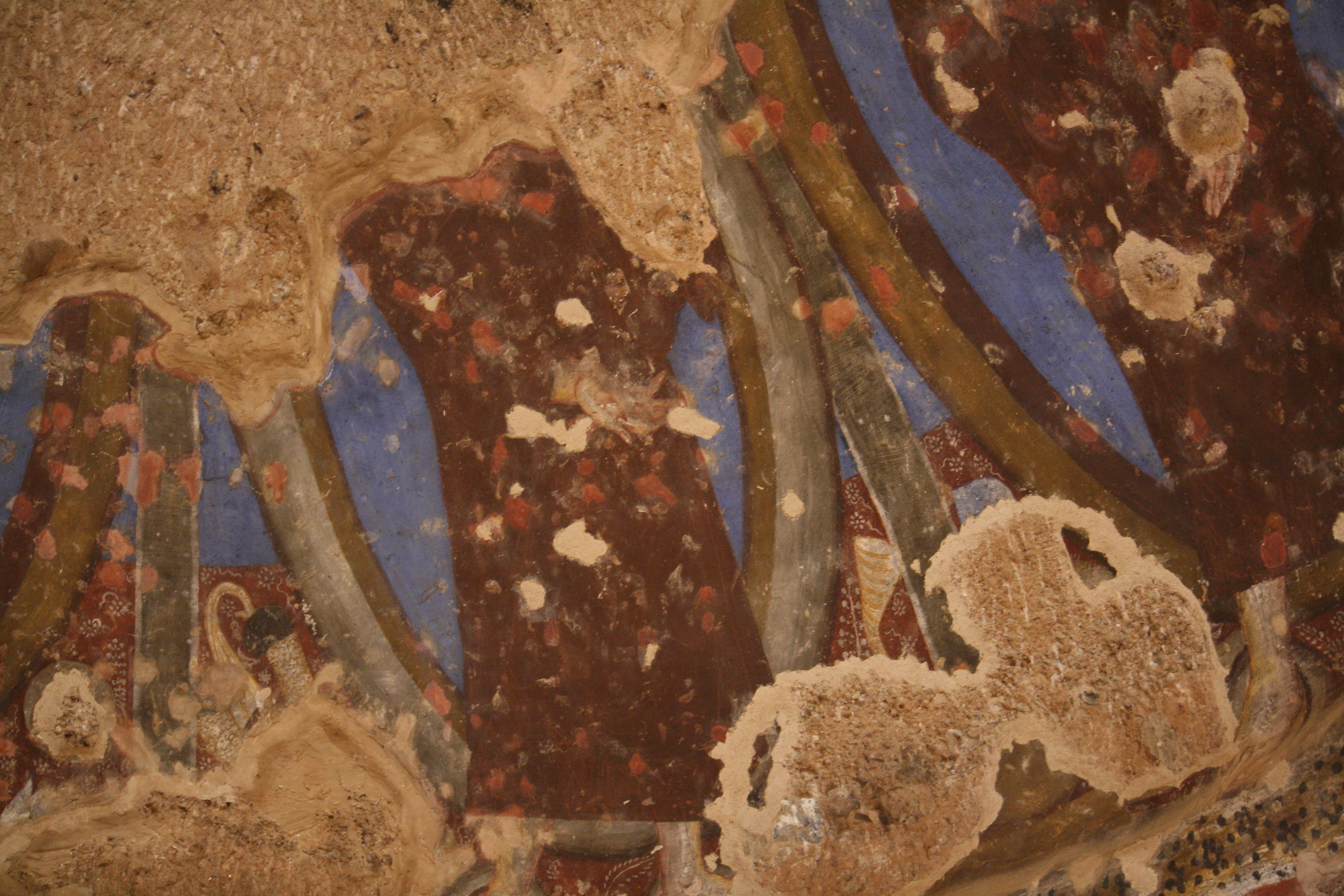
Detail of the frescoes inside the caves of the Bamiyan Buddha complex

The people shared similar culture with other Indo-Iranians. The ancient religion of Kafiristan survived here until the 19th century. Another religion, Zoroastrianism is believed by some to have originated in what is now Afghanistan between 1800 and 800 BC, as its founder Zoroaster is thought to have lived and died in Balkh. Ancient Eastern Iranian languages may have been spoken in the region around the time of the rise of Zoroastrianism.

By the middle of the 6th century BC, the Achaemenid Persians overthrew the Medes and incorporated Arachosia, Aria, and Bactria within its eastern boundaries. An inscription on the tombstone of King Darius I of Persia mentions the Kabul Valley in a list of the 29 countries that he had conquered.

In 330 BC, Alexander the Great seized the area but left it to the Seleucids to rule.

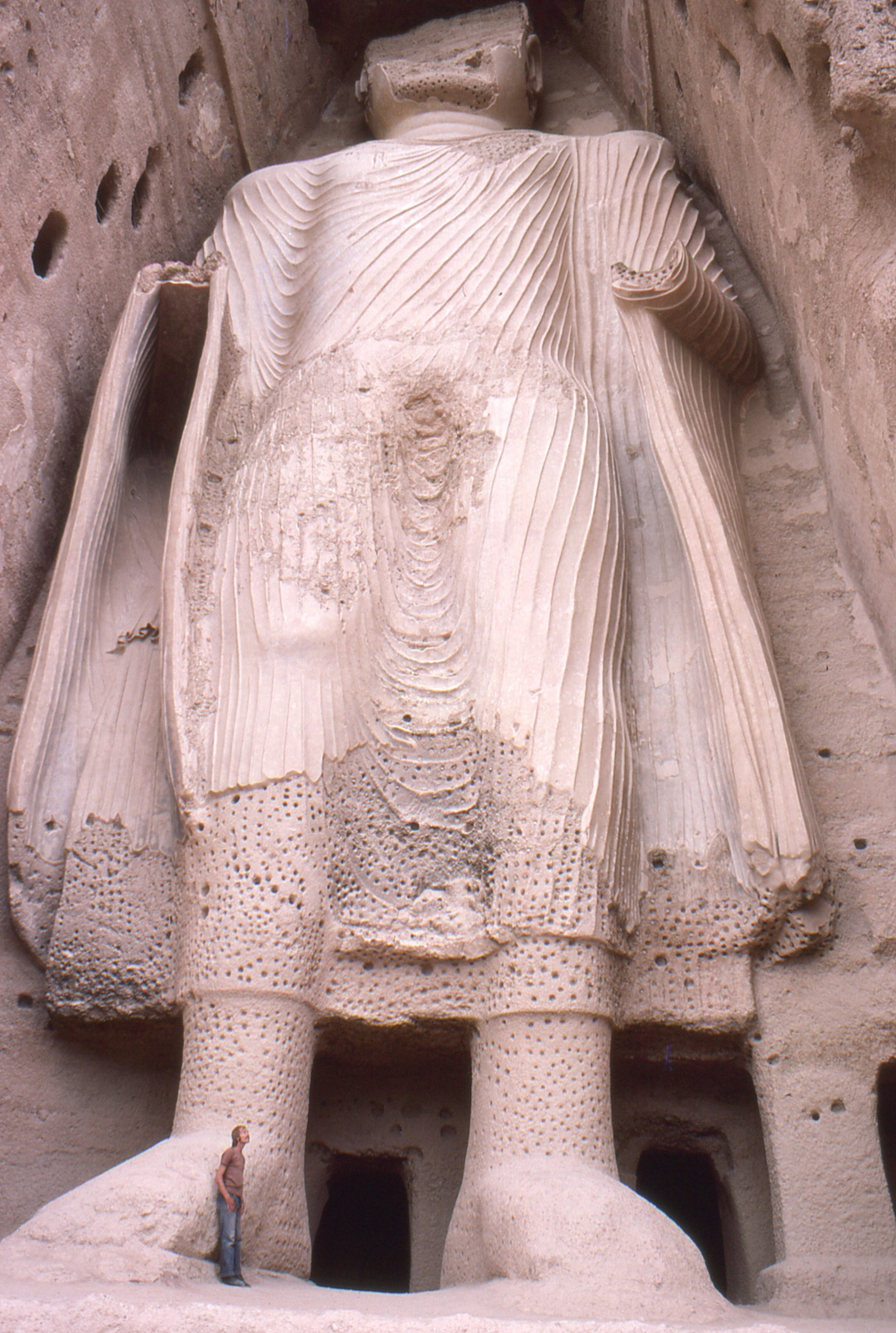
The smaller Buddha of Bamiyan. Buddhism was widespread in the region before the Islamic conquest of Afghanistan.

Afghanistan's significant ancient tangible and intangible Buddhist heritage is recorded through wide-ranging archeological finds, including religious and artistic remnants. Buddhist doctrines are reported to have reached as far as Balkh even during the life of the Buddha (563 BC to 483 BC), as recorded by Husang Tsang. It became the site of an early Buddhist monastery. Buddhism was by this time in "an expansionist mode, offering religious practices that spoke to the masses and an appealing style of illustrative art, backed by the subtle philosophy of the Mahayana sect". Many statues of Buddha were carved into the sides of cliffs facing Bamyan city. The two most prominent of these statues were standing Buddhas, now known as the Buddhas of Bamyan, measuring 53 and 40 meters high respectively, which were the largest examples of standing Buddha carvings in the world. They were probably erected in the 4th or 5th century A.D. They were cultural landmarks for many years and are listed among UNESCO's World Heritage Sites.

=== Medieval times ===
By the 7th century, when the Arabs first arrived, it was under the control of the Turk Shahis before being conquered in the name of Islam by the Saffarids in the 9th century. The Tang dynasty of China controlled large parts of the region during the reign of Emperor Taizong of Tang and Emperor Gaozong of Tang. The Tibetan Empire also extended its influence into the region. The region fell to the Ghaznavids followed by the Ghurids before the Mongol invasion in the 13th century. After the Mongol invasion, the area was ruled by Arghun Khan of Ilkhanate, later by the Timurids and Mughals.

In 1709, when the Hotaki dynasty rose to power in Kandahar and defeated the Persian Safavids, Bamyan was under the Mughal Empire influence until Ahmad Shah Durrani made it become part of the Afghan Durrani Empire, which became what is now the modern state of Afghanistan.

=== Modern history ===
==== 20th century ====
In the 1980s, during the Soviet–Afghan War, the Hazara rebel leader Abdul Ali Mazari began a resistance movement against the Soviets in the region, Shura-e-Itifaq-e-Islami. In the early 1990s, there was an agreement to run Bamyan under a council of "local ethnic and political groups".

Later in the 1990s, the Taliban took control of the region and made their own government; one notable figure of this group was Mohammed Akbari, who effectively worked with the Taliban after meeting with one of their delegations in 1998 (and would later serve as an Afghan Parliament member in the 2000s). Some Hazaras allied with them. Bamyan was the main location for a rebellion against the Taliban, an alliance of armed Shiite groups named the Hizb-e Wahdat. This led to a struggle in the western province of Bamyan, Yakawlang, which was regarded by both sides as being key to control northern and central Afghanistan.

==== 21st century ====
In 2000, the Taliban lost control of the district to local militias, but quickly took it back. To curb future rebellions, in early 2001 the Taliban arrested 300 civilian adult men and executed them publicly. The Supreme Leader of the Taliban at the time, Mullah Mohammad Omar, allegedly stopped more retribution acts in the area, but he did not forgive the rebellion. In March, Omar ordered the Taliban to destroy the Buddhas of Bamiyan, claiming they were symbols of idolatry. UNESCO called it a "crime against culture".

Later in 2001, the U.S. and NATO invaded Afghanistan, and local militias in Bamyan sided with them to fight against the Taliban. There was evidence that Taliban fighters started massacring many Hazaras there in October. The Taliban fled the region in December. NATO eventually created a new government in Afghanistan. In 2003, Bamyan was recognized as one of the safest provinces in the country, which allowed for civil rebuilding. Over the next few decades, women's rights would be restored. It became the area of the country most visited by tourists, and it elected Afghanistan's first female governor of a province, Habiba Sarabi, who created the Band-e-Amir National Park. A local Hazara named Haji Hekmat Hussein, a parliamentary candidate in the U.S.' new government, was secretly a Taliban intelligence officer who participated in the 2001 massacre. He would be arrested and jailed, but was released in 2020 as a part of the Doha Agreement between the U.S. and Taliban.

A small number of troops from New Zealand would be stationed there, and the Taliban insurgency started targeting them in 2008. The U.S. made a "protective belt" around the province that stopped anyone outside, including other Afghanis, from coming into Bamyan. Control of the belt was given to local militias, which caused conflict between various ethnic groups. By 2009, the regional Afghan National Police, who fought against insurgents, started running out of money, and had to be aided by U.S. and New Zealand troops.

By 2011, the Taliban in Bamyan started gaining strength, and there was concern over their future plans as NATO began their phased withdrawal from the country. The U.S. and NATO's combat mission in Afghanistan formally ended in 2014.

In 2021, the Taliban started an offensive to retake Afghanistan. They made significant advances by July, and two districts, Saighan and Kahmard, had been taken. There was an effort by police and local militias to keep the Taliban 60 miles away from Bamyan city, which the Afghanistan government believed could be the start of a turnaround for their military in the region. In August 2021, Ashraf Ghani's government collapsed, and the Taliban took Bamyan on August 15. Initially, there was a conflict between different Taliban members in the area of whether or not policies put in place in the province to show the new Taliban government would be more liberal or moderate in its ideology. Other Taliban members resented the locals who embraced those ideals in the prior 20 years. In July 2022, the Taliban forbid humanitarian aid into the province. In August 2023, they banned women from entering Band-e-Amir National Park.

== Administrative divisions ==
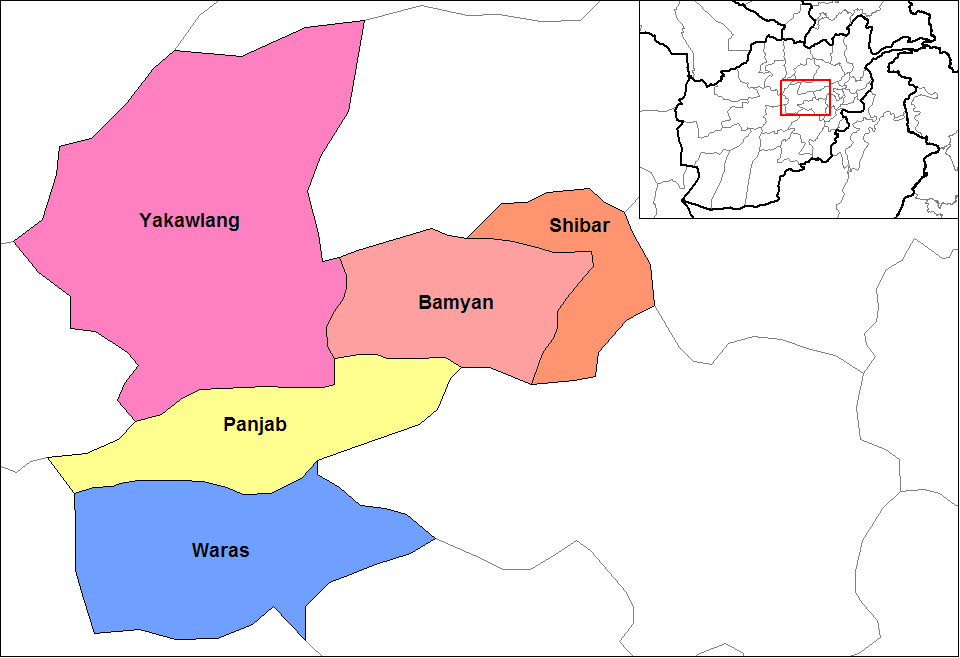
Map of the districts of Bamyan as of January 2004, prior to the redrawing of provincial and district boundaries later that year

District	Capital	Population (2020)	Area in km^{2}	Pop. density per km^{2}	Ethnic composition
Bamyan	Bamyan	94,855	1,798	53	(76% Hazaras) (82% Shiites,) (16% Sayyids / Sadat), (6% Tajiks, ) (1% Qizilbash) (<1% Pashtuns.)
Kahmard	Kahmard	41,053	1,389	30	85% Tajiks, 14% Hazaras (8% Shiites, 6% Sunni Tatars), 1% Pashtuns. Used to belong to Baghlan Province.
Panjab	Panjab	77,058	1,961	39	90% Hazaras. Sayyids/Sadat
Sayghan	Sayghan	27,103	1,729	16	Used to be part of Kahmard District.
Shibar	Shibar	33,348	1,372	24	(50% Hazaras) (33% Shiites) (16% Ismailis,) (10% Sayyids / Sadat ),( 44% Tajiks.
Waras	Waras	123,293	2,975	41	99% Hazaras, 1% Sayyids.
Yakawlang	Yakawlang	68,821	4,579	15	>50% Hazaras (8% Shiites, 48% Sayyids/ Sadat ), <1% Tajiks.
Yakawlang 2		30,026	2,223	14	Used to be part of Yakawlang District.
Bamyan		495,557	18,029	27	(83.9% Hazaras) (71.1% Shiites,) (30.8% Sayyids/Sadat) 1.1% Ismailis, 0.9% Sunni Tatars), 16.1% Farsiwan (15.9% Tajiks, 0.2% Qizilbash), 0.3% Pashtuns.

== Economy ==
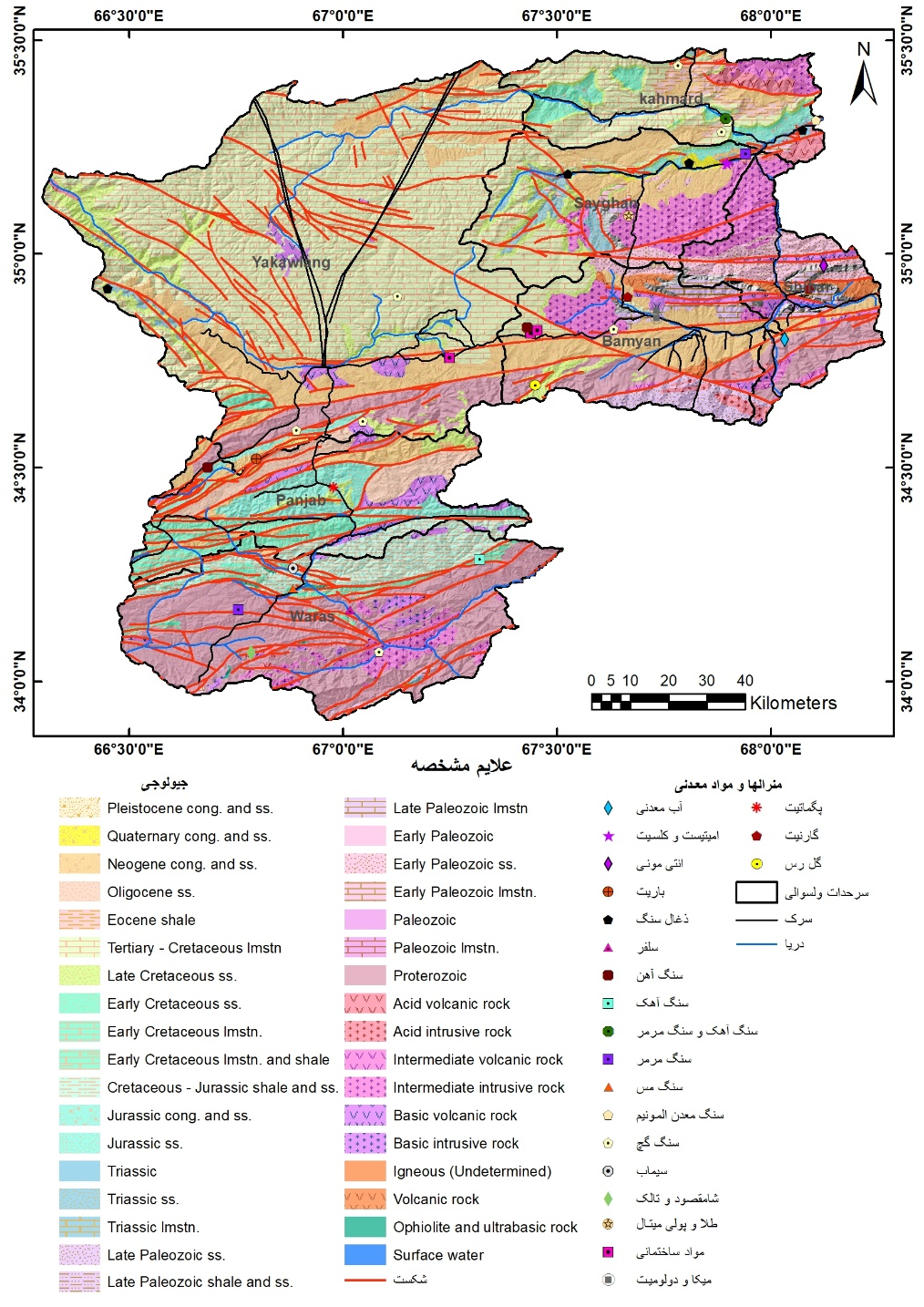
Map of mines of Bamian Province

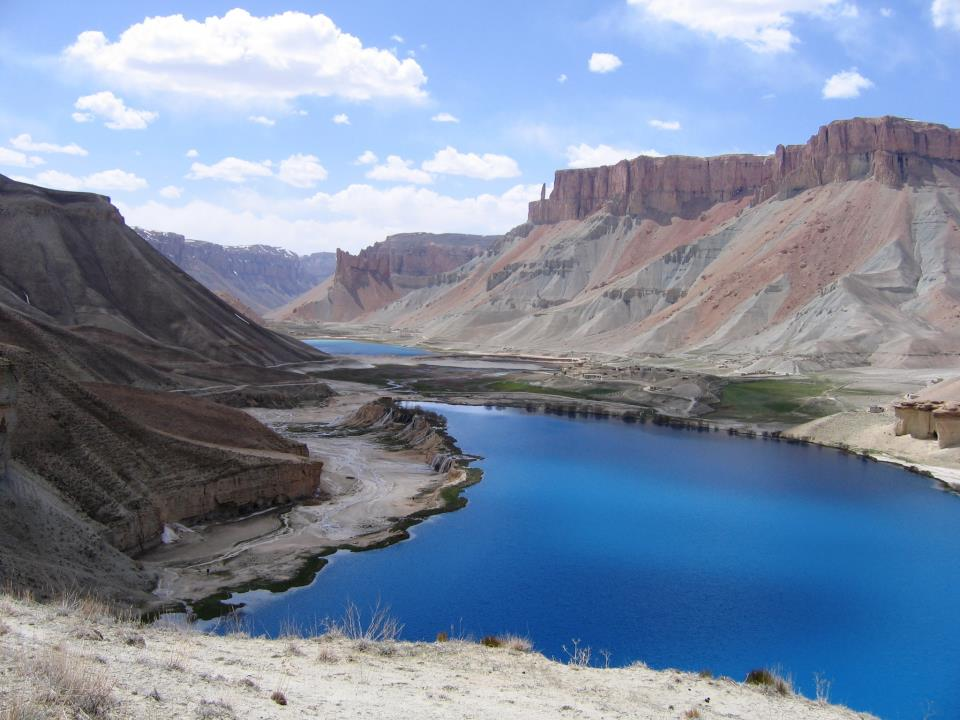
Band-e Amir National Park

=== Agriculture ===
Bamiyan has been particularly famous for its potatoes. The region is also known for a "shuttle system" of planting, wherein seed potatoes are grown in winter in Jalalabad, a warm area of eastern Afghanistan, and then transferred to Bamyan for spring re-planting.

=== Tourism ===
Prior to the Soviet invasion of 1979, the province attracted many tourists. Although this number is considerably fewer now, Bamyan is the first province in Afghanistan to have set up a tourist board, Bamyan Tourism. A feature of this developing tourist industry is based on skiing. The province is said to have 'some of the best "outback skiing" in the world and in 2008 an $1.2 million project to encourage skiing was launched by the Aga Khan Foundation (AKF) with the help of NZAID, New Zealand government's international aid agency. The province hosts the Afghan Ski Challenge, a 7 km downhill race over ungroomed and powdered snow, founded by Swiss journalist and skier Christoph Zurcher. Tissot, the Swiss watch manufacturer, is the principal sponsor.

=== Transportation ===
As of May 2014, the province was served by Bamyan Airport in Bamyan which had regularly scheduled direct flights to Kabul.

== Demographics ==
=== Population ===
The province of Bamyan has an estimated population of around 496,000 people.

=== Ethnicity, languages and religion ===
The residents are Hazaras, followed by significant populations of Tajiks and Pashtuns.

Estimated ethnolinguistic and -religious composition
Ethnicity	Hazara	Tajik/ Farsiwan	Pashtun	Sadat	Others	Sources
Period	Hazara	Tajik/ Farsiwan	Pashtun	Sadat	Others	Sources

2004–2021 (Islamic Republic)	67 – 70%	16 – 20%	≤15%	≤16%	∅
2020 EU	1st	2nd	3rd	–	–
2018 UN	70%	20%	5%	–	–
2015 CP	majority	∅	∅	–	∅ (Note: incl. Tatar.)
2015 NPS	67.4%	15.7%	0.1%	16%	∅ (Note: incl. 0.5% Tatar and 0.2% Qizilbash.)
2012 CSSF (Note: Demographic information is based on data from 2012.)	67%	16%	15%	–	∅ (Note: incl. Uzbek, Turkmen, and Aimaq.)
2011 PRT	96%		∅ (Note: excl. Kochi.)	(Note: incl. in the 96% Tajik/Farsiwan/Hazara estimation.)	∅ (Note: incl. Tatar.)
2011 USA	majority	15%	–	–	∅ (Note: incl. Tatar.)
2009 ISW	majority	–	–	–	–

Legend:
- ∅: Ethnicity mentioned in source but not quantified
- –: Ethnicity not mentioned specifically
- Source abbreviations: Empirical sources: –, Government sources: CP – Colombo Plan, EU – European Union Agency for Asylum, PRT – Provincial Reconstruction Team of the United States government, UN – United Nations Assistance Mission in Afghanistan, Editorial sources: CSSF – Center for the Scientific Study of Families, ISW – Institute for the Study of War, NPS – Naval Postgraduate School, USA – United States Army

=== Education ===
Bamyan Province is home to the region's only university, Bamiyan University in the city of Bamyan. The school was founded in the mid-1990s, and largely destroyed under the Taliban and by US airstrikes. It was later refurbished by New Zealand Provincial Reconstruction Teams following the fall of the Taliban.

== Gallery ==
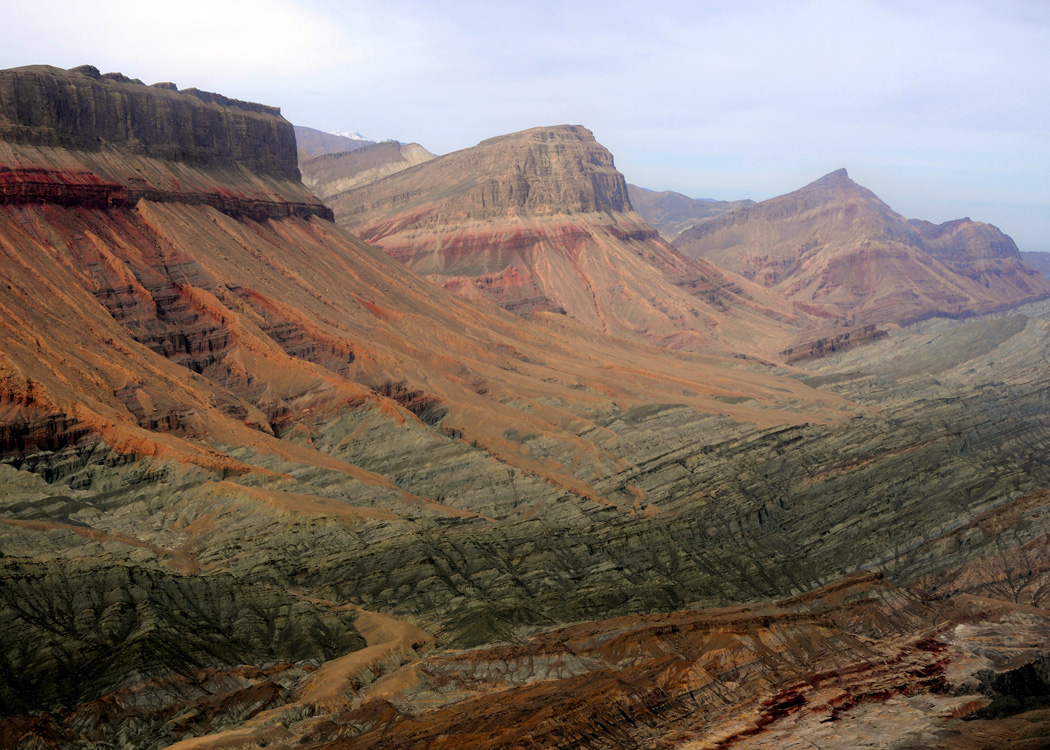
A valley in Bamyan province

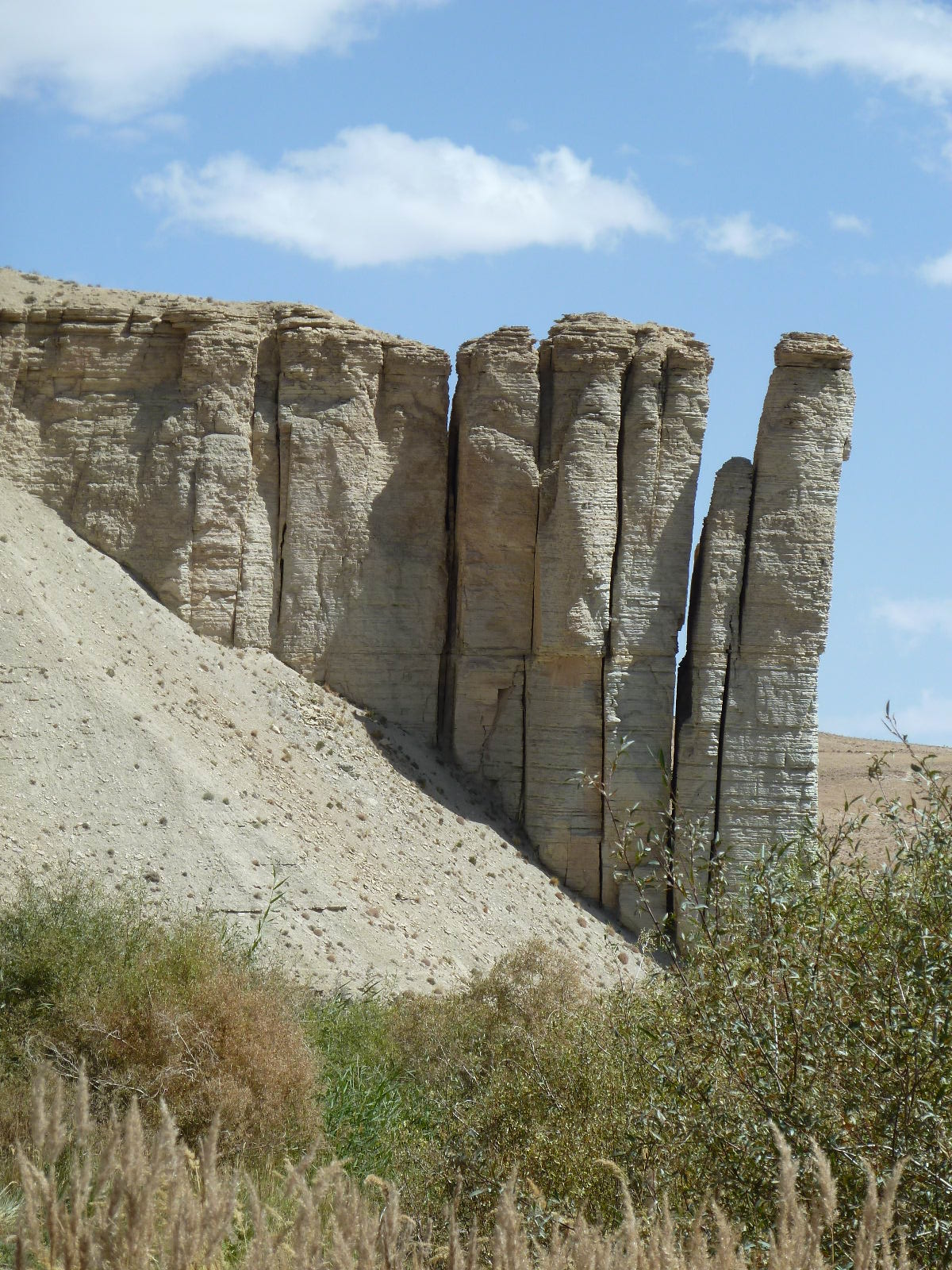
Band-e Amir in Bamyan, mountain cliffs

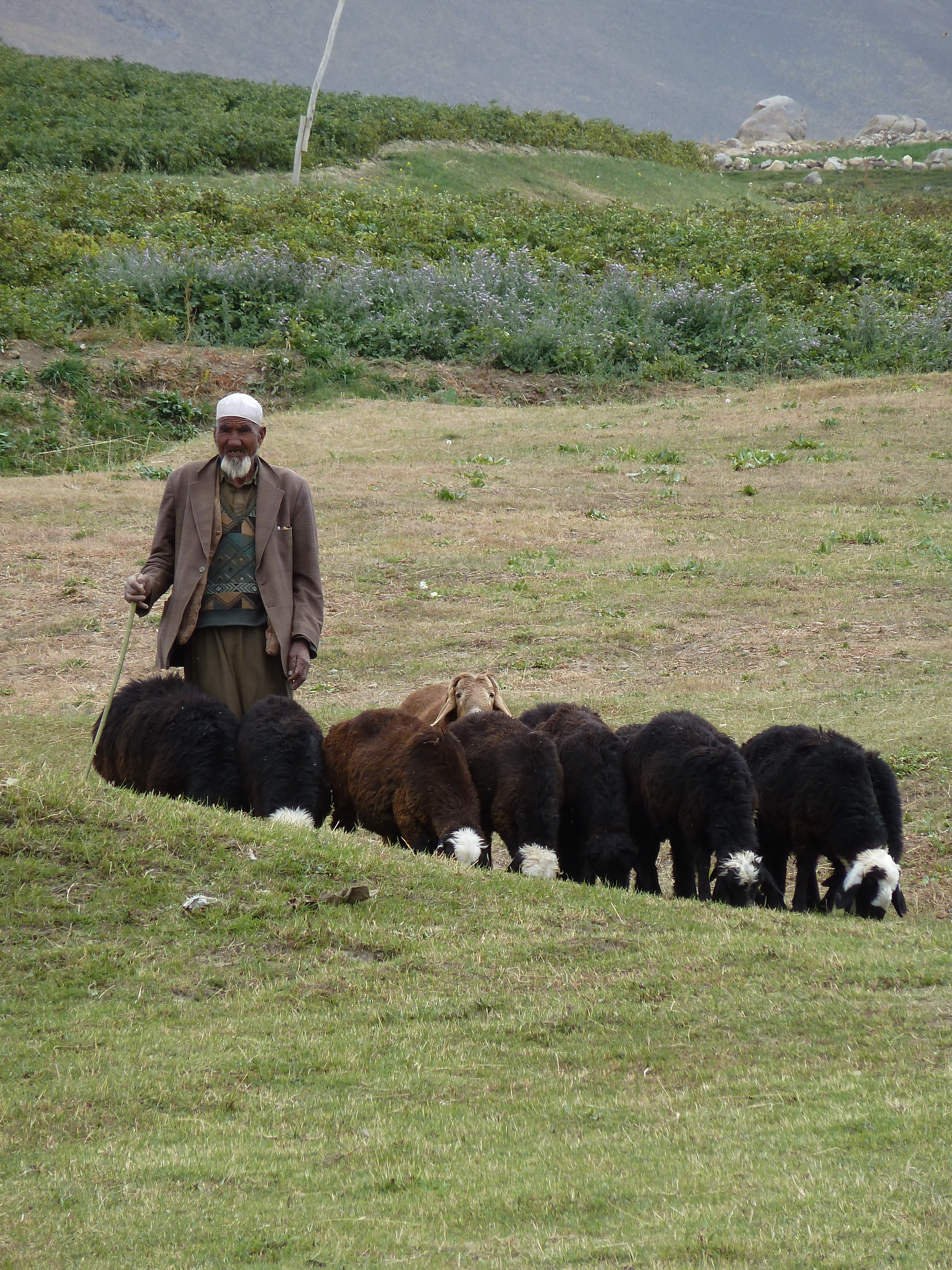
Local in Bamyan area

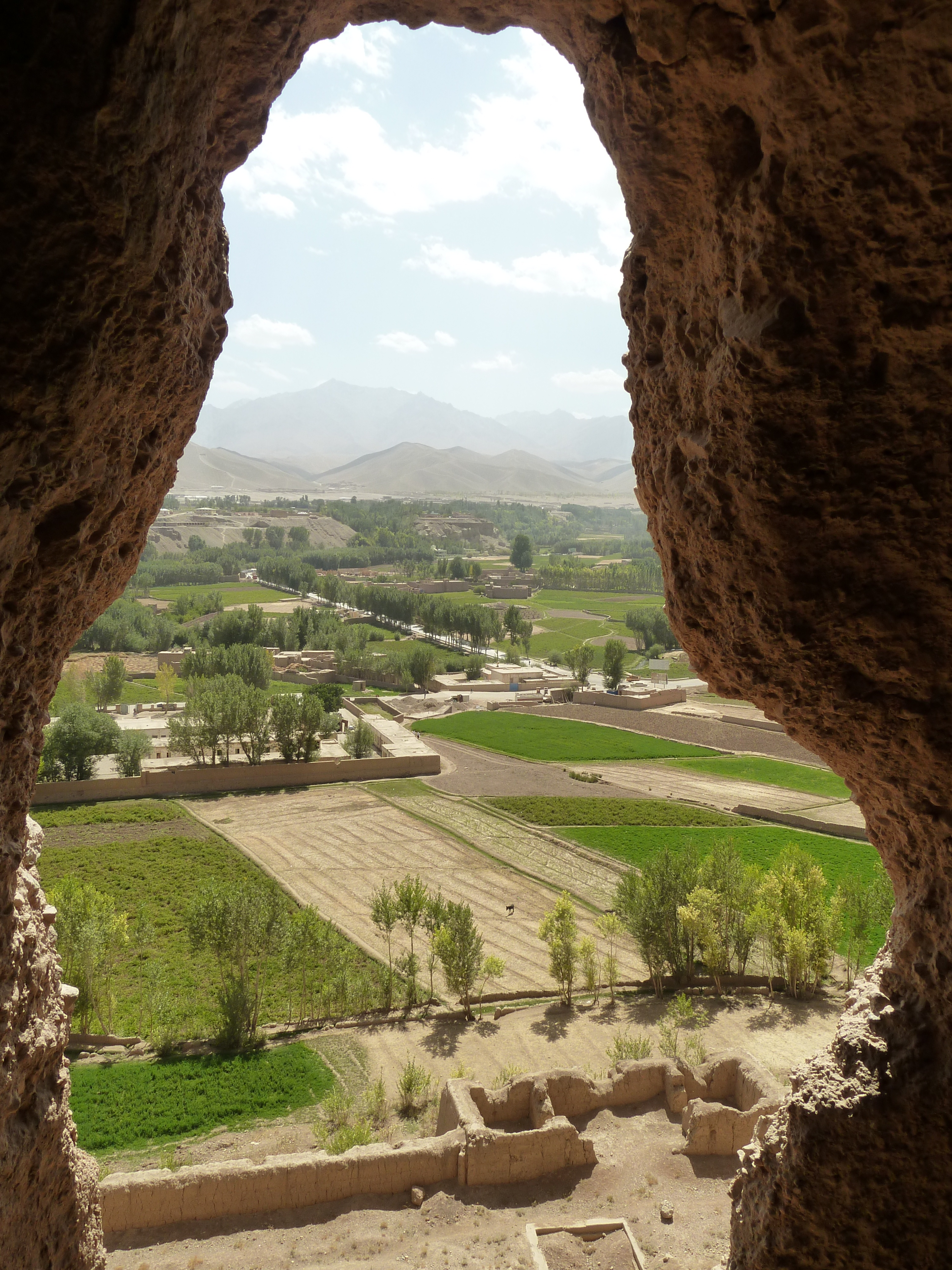
Overview of area in Bamyan, from Buddha statues

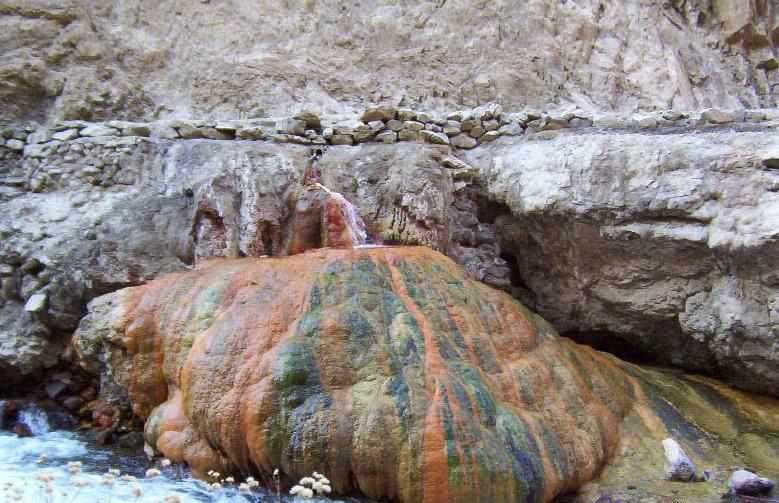
Kallu Valley

== See also ==
- Hazarajat
