= Bamyan University =

University in Bamyan, Afghanistan

Coordinates: 34.8037327°N 67.8303919°E

- پوهنتون بامیان / د بامیان پوهنتون
- Established: 1996
- Chancellor: Mufti Hazrat Mohammad Burhani
- Students: 5,500
- Location: Bamyan, Bamyan Province, Afghanistan
- Website: www.bu.edu.af

Bamyan University (Note: Pashto: د بامیان پوهنتون Dari: پوهنتون بامیان) is the largest public university in Bamyan, Afghanistan. It was established in 1996 and currently has over 5,500 students. Its chancellor is Mufti Hazrat Mohammad Burhani.

== History ==
Construction of Bamyan University was initiated in the mid 1990s with support from Hezbe Wahdat, a political party founded by Abdul Ali Mazari in 1989. Before the Taliban takeover of the area in the late 1990s, there were hundreds of male and female students studying in the university, under 40 professors. Its facilities at the time were simple, consisting of a few mud huts.

The university was closed by the Taliban after their capture of Bamyan in September 1998. Two buildings were stripped for scrap, while the third was used as their barracks and communications center. This third building was destroyed by United States airstrikes at the start of the war in Afghanistan in 2001.

Bamyan University began to be refurbished in 2004 with assistance from the American and New Zealand Provincial Reconstruction Teams. It reopened with enrollment of 97 male and female students; the academic staff was 40 with a majority holding a master's degree. Construction was, at one point, delayed due to the need to clear landmines, leading to student protests. A number of Afghans who had taken refuge in Iran returned to Bamyan; of that group several female intellectuals became lecturers at the university.

== See also ==
- List of universities in Afghanistan
