= Siege of Bamyan =

Mongol campaign in 1220–1221

- Part of the Mongol invasion of Khorasan
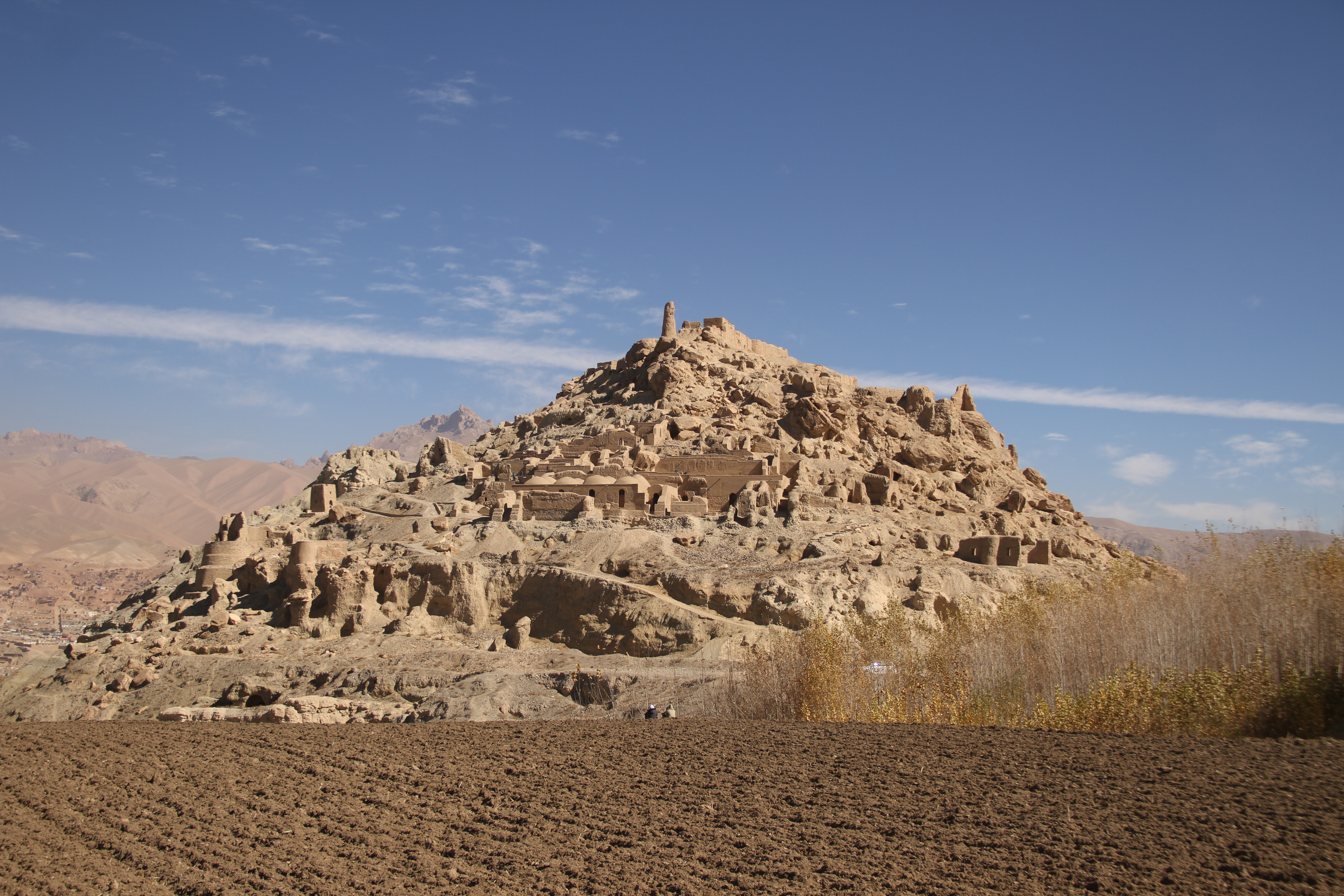
- Ruins of modern-day Shahr-e-Gholghola
Date	July 1221
Location	Bamyan, Khwarazmian Empire (present-day Hazarajat, Afghanistan) 34°49′30″N 67°50′00″E
Result	Mongol victory

Belligerents
Mongol Empire	Khwarazmian Empire

Commanders and leaders
Genghis Khan	Jalal al-Din Mangburni

Casualties and losses
Heavy	All killed
- Location of the siege on a map of modern Afghanistan Bamyan (South Asia)

The siege of Bamyan (Dari: محاصره بامیان) took place in the spring of 1221 A.D. during the Mongol invasion of Khorasan by an army under the leadership of Genghis Khan, ruler of the Mongol Empire, who was in pursuit of Sultan Jalal al-Din Mangburni, the last ruler of the Khwarazmian Empire. Genghis Khan crossed the Hindu Kush and after that besieged the citadel of Shahr-e-Gholghola near Bamyan, northwest of Kabul, in present-day Afghanistan. The siege had led to a devastating attack that left the city in ruins.

== Background ==
After besieging Taloqan for several months, the Mongols of the Khagan Genghis Khan marched to confront the Shah Jalal al-Din Mangburni, the last representative of the Khwarazmian Empire, who had formed a new Muslim army in what is now Afghanistan and had defeated a Mongol army at the Battle of Parwan.

Based on Al-Idrisi, the demographer Tertius Chandler noted that Bamyan was three times smaller than Balkh in 1150. Chandler estimated that Balkh had a population of about thirty thousand people (a rounded estimate) and calculated that the Friday Mosque of Bamyan had a capacity of about nine thousand people.

== Siege ==
When the Mongols arrived before Bamyan, the inhabitants made it clear that they intended to resist by force, leading both sides to deploy archers and catapults. During the siege, however, Mutukan (Note: Also transliterated as Mao-Tukan, Mutugen, Muatukan, Mütegin, Metiken, Mamgan, or Mamusgan.)—the eldest son of Chagatai Khan and the Khagan’s favourite grandson—was struck by an arrow and died soon afterward. This event led his grandfather, Genghis Khan, to order that all works aimed at capturing the fortress be accelerated. According to certain accounts, Jalal al-Din Mangburni’s daughter revealed a secret entrance to the Mongols, enabling them to take the city. No quarter was given during the subsequent fighting, which is thought to have lasted for roughly a month. The Khagan was deeply grieved by the death of his grandson, and, upon taking the city, he issued a yasak (edict) commanding that every person, animal, bird, or wild creature in Bamyan be killed and that no booty be taken. Not even pregnant women were spared. He further ordered that no one inform his son Chagatai of what had occurred. When Chagatai eventually arrived and asked about Mutukan, the Khagan informed him of the loss but commanded him not to weep. Chagatai therefore turned to eating and drinking to dull his grief and, under a pretext, withdrew to the steppe so that he might weep alone without disobeying his father.

== Aftermath ==
According to Yaqub al-Herawi, all the inhabitants of the city were killed. The city remained in ruins for many years and became known as Mao-Kurgan or Ma'u-Baligh, which in Persian means “cursed city.” It was also referred to as the “city of sorrows” or the “city of cries,” reflecting the deaths of its inhabitants during the Mongol conquest. Today, the site of the ancient city of Bamyan is a UNESCO World Heritage Site, but Bamyan did not fully recover from the effects of the Mongol conquest for an extended period. Even decades later, sources indicate that the city remained largely uninhabited and in a state of ruin.

After the victory, the Mongols plundered Tus and Mashhad, and by the spring of that year the Khorasan region was under their control. Genghis Khan spent the summer in the foothills near Taloqan with his sons and armies, planning his next campaign against the Shah, at which time he was joined by his sons Chagatai and Ögedei. He then continued his march toward the Indian subcontinent.

The Swedish historian Carl Fredrick Sverdrup estimated that only in the second half of 1221 did Genghis Khan finally gather around 50,000 troops to operate in Khorasan. In addition, about 10,000 soldiers were with his generals Jebe and Subutai in the western Iranian Plateau, while several thousand others garrisoned Transoxiana or followed his son Jochi into the northern steppes.

A common belief holds that after the local population was annihilated, Genghis Khan repopulated the region with Mongol soldiers and their slave women to garrison the area while he continued his campaign. These settlers are believed to have become the ancestors of the Hazara people, whose name likely derives from the Persian hezār (“thousand”), referring to the Mongol military unit of one thousand soldiers. Another theory proposes that they are descended from the ancient Kushan peoples.

The death of Mutukan meant that his father Chagatai was eventually succeeded by his grandson Qara Hülegü as ruler of the Chagatai Khanate.
