= Bamyan District =

Bamyan بامیان
- District
- Location within Afghanistan
- Coordinates: 34°49′00″N 67°49′00″E
- Country: Afghanistan
- Province: Bamyan

Population (2003)
  - Total: 70,028
- Time zone: GMT+04:30 Kabul

Bamyan (Dari/Hazaragi: بامیان) is a district of Bamyan province in Afghanistan. In 2003, the population was put at 70,028, of which the majority group is Hazaras. New Zealand peace keepers operate in the district as well as most of Bamyan Province.

Villages in Bamyan District include `Ambar Samuch and more.

== See also ==
- Districts of Afghanistan
- Hazarajat
