= Sikh conquest of Kashmir =

1819 military campaign in which the Sikh Empire conquered Kashmir from Durrani Afghan rule

- Part of the Afghan–Sikh wars
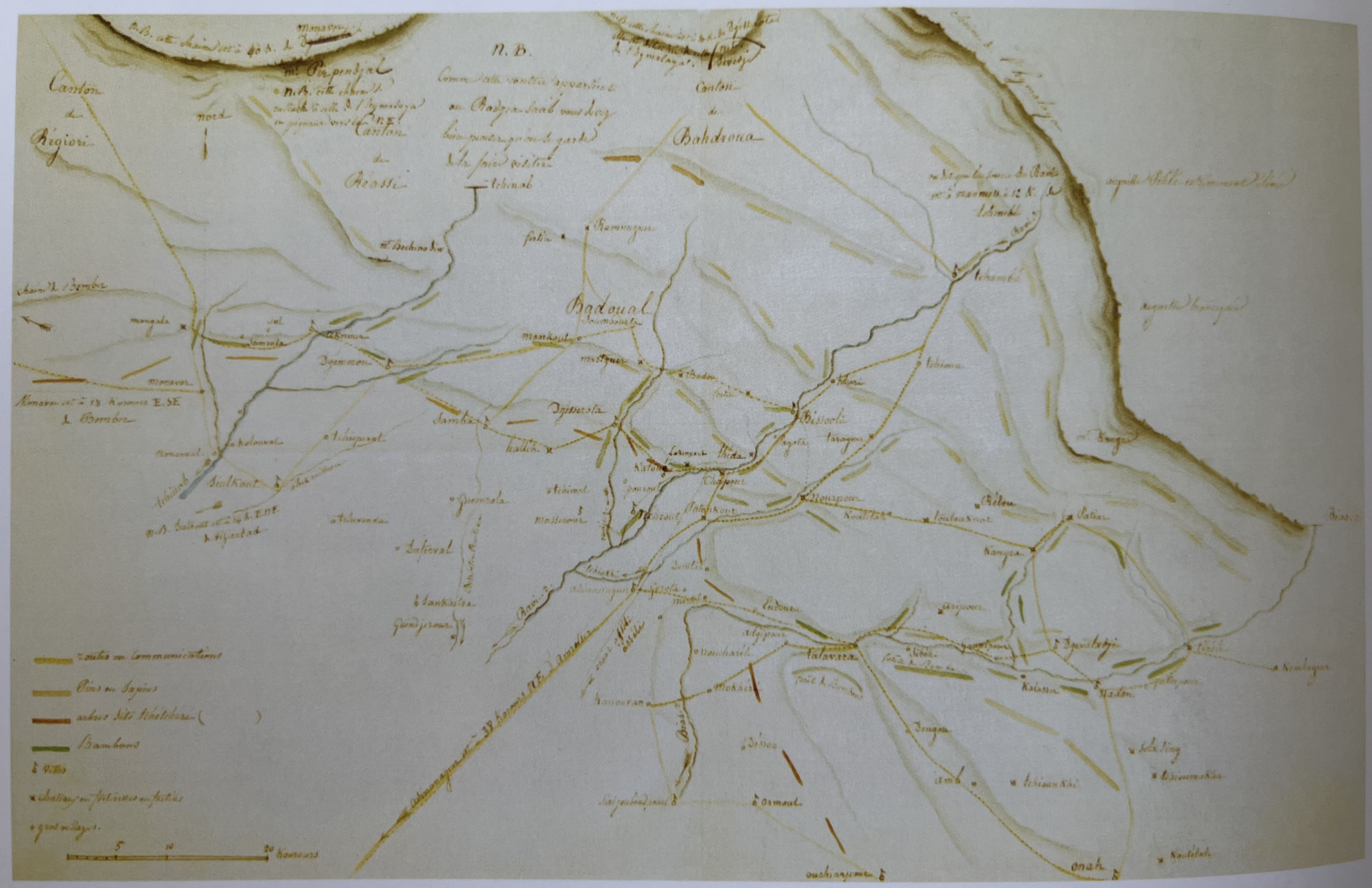
- Map of Kashmir by General Claude Auguste Court
Date	February–July 1819
Location	Bhimber, Rajouri, Poonch, Tari, Pir Panjal Pass, Aliabad, Shopian and the Kashmir Valley
Result	Sikh victory
Territorial changes	Kashmir annexed to the Sikh Empire

Belligerents
Sikh Empire	Durrani Empire

Commanders and leaders
Ranjit Singh; Misr Diwan Chand; Kharak Singh; Hari Singh Nalwa; Akali Phula Singh; Sham Singh Attariwala; Jawala Singh	Jabbar Khan (WIA); Wali Mohammad Khan †; Abdullah Khan †; Abdul Rahman †; Zabardast Khan (POW); Raja Aghar Khan (POW)

Strength
About 30,000: 12,000 engaged at Shopian	Unknown total force: 12,000 engaged at Shopian

The Sikh conquest of Kashmir was a military campaign in 1819 in which the forces of Ranjit Singh defeated the Afghan administration of the Kashmir Valley and annexed the region to his kingdom. The campaign followed an unsuccessful Sikh invasion in 1814 and was undertaken after Muhammad Azim Khan left Kashmir for Kabul, placing his brother Jabbar Khan in charge while removing much of the experienced Afghan force from the valley.

Misr Diwan Chand and Akali Phula Singh commanded the principal invading force, supported by a column under Kharak Singh, while Ranjit Singh remained behind the advance with a reserve and supervised supplies. The army moved through Bhimber, Rajouri and Poonch, crossed the Pir Panjal Range, and defeated Jabbar Khan's forces in the approaches to Shopian in early July. Jabbar Khan withdrew from Kashmir, and Sikh troops subsequently occupied Srinagar. Historians give different dates for their entry into the city, either 4 or 15 July 1819.

The conquest ended the Afghan administration of the valley. Kashmir was initially placed under military control before Diwan Moti Ram assumed the governorship. The first months of occupation included the suppression of remaining opposition, revenue reorganisation, plundering by some Sikh troops, and restrictions on several Muslim religious practices.

== Background ==
Ranjit Singh's interest in Kashmir preceded the 1819 campaign. In 1813 he cooperated with Wazir Fateh Khan during the invasion with the objective of removing Atta Muhammad Khan from Kashmir. A further attempt followed in 1814, when Sikh forces advanced through the hill states towards the Pir Panjal.

Preparations for the 1814 expedition included the accumulation of provisions at Rajouri, arrangements for war material, and attempts to secure the cooperation of chiefs controlling the approaches to Kashmir. Ranjit Singh divided his army between routes leading through Rajouri, Poonch and the Pir Panjal. One force was commanded by Ram Dayal, while Ranjit Singh accompanied another towards the Tosha Maidan route.

The invasion was hampered by heavy rain, cold weather, shortages of provisions and difficulties maintaining supply lines. Afghan troops held positions in the mountain passes and resisted the Sikh advance. Ranjit Singh's force eventually withdrew towards Poonch and Bhimber, while Ram Dayal's detachment remained nearer the valley before securing its withdrawal. Ranjit Singh returned to Lahore in August 1814.

The failure affected Sikh authority among the hill chiefs around Kashmir. Bhimber and Rajouri later revolted against the Sikh Empire, while the rulers of Poonch and Nurpur asserted greater independence. Ranjit Singh nevertheless restored his position in some of the approaches to the valley during the following years.

In 1818 Ranjit Singh conquered Multan. The resources obtained there were available for another Kashmir expedition, while conditions within the Afghan administration had also changed. Muhammad Azim Khan left Kashmir for Kabul and entrusted the province to his brother Jabbar Khan. Much of the experienced Afghan force had also been removed from the valley for service in Afghanistan.

Bir Bal Dhar, a Kashmiri revenue official who had reached Ranjit Singh's court, also played a role in preparations for the renewed campaign. Dhar pressed Ranjit Singh to invade Kashmir and left his son Raj Kak Dhar at Lahore as a guarantee of his conduct. Saraf, however, rejects the claim that Dhar promised to reimburse the expenses of the expedition in the event of its failure.

== Preparations ==
Ranjit Singh sent Lala Krishen Dayal to Bhimber and Rajouri to examine political conditions along the proposed line of advance. Misr Diwan Chand was appointed commander-in-chief and instructed to proceed towards Rajouri with senior officers. Heavy cannon were to remain at Bhimber because of the mountainous terrain, while lighter guns and muskets were taken forward. Supplies and military equipment were assembled at Lahore.

Support was also sought from chiefs and landholders between the Punjab and Kashmir. Sultan Khan of Bhimber was released from captivity on the condition that he assist the invading army and serve as a guide. Bir Bal Dhar was used to maintain contact with local chiefs and landholders, while his son Raj Kak remained at Lahore during the campaign.

The invading army was organised into several bodies. Misr Diwan Chand and Akali Phula Singh commanded the main field force, Kharak Singh commanded another column, and Ranjit Singh retained a reserve behind them. Among the officers serving with the expedition were Hari Singh Nalwa, Jawala Singh and Sham Singh Attariwala.

Estimates of the size of the Sikh army vary considerably. Hari Ram Gupta gives the invading force as about 12,000 men, while Rajinder Kaur records a Sikh force of 12,000 assembled at Serai Ali before the battle with Jabbar Khan. Muhammad Yusuf Saraf estimates the army that entered Srinagar at about 30,000, whereas R. K. Parmu places the total Sikh force at approximately 35,000, explicitly including both combatants and non-combatants.

As for the Afghan force, the estimates also differ. Rajinder Kaur gives the Afghan strength at about 12,000 cavalry and infantry before the battle. R. K. Parmu does not give a precise figure for Jabbar Khan's field army, but states that there were several thousand Afghan civilians, combatants and camp followers in the valley.

== Campaign ==
=== Destruction of Rajouri ===
Kharak Singh's advance force left Lahore on 26 February 1819. Ranjit Singh followed in April and established a base at Wazirabad, while Diwan Chand moved towards Bhimber and Rajouri. Gulcharan Singh places the main advance from Bhimber in May, after the winter snows had begun to clear.

Diwan Chand left his heavy artillery at Bhimber and continued with lighter guns. By June, the Sikh forces had secured Rajouri, Poonch and the approaches south of the Pir Panjal. Sultan Khan accompanied the army and assisted its movement through the hill country.

After Aghar Khan withdrew, Sikh troops destroyed the fort and plundered Rajouri. The occupation was also accompanied by arson, abductions and molestation of women. Aghar Khan then withdrew into the surrounding country and began attacking isolated Sikh parties. His defection has also been explained as an attempt to preserve Muslim rule in Kashmir and the neighbouring hill states.

=== Siege of Tari fort ===
The routes taken by the Sikh forces are not consistent across the accounts. According to R. K. Parmu, Diwan Chand's main column advanced by the Darhal route, while a second force used the Pir Panjal route and a reconnaissance column covered the advance. Hari Ram Gupta, however, has Misr Diwan Chand crossing by the Toshamaidan route before descending towards Serai Ali and Shopian. Gulcharan Singh, for his part, has Diwan Chand dividing his force into three columns before accompanying the leading column across the Pir Panjal.

Painting of Baramulla Pass in Muzaffarabad, Kashmir, during Sikh-rule, by Godfrey Thomas Vigne

Diwan Chand had left the heavy guns at Bhimber and continued into the hills with lighter artillery. His force reached Rajouri and resumed the advance after 23 June, reaching Baramugulla by the end of the month and securing the passage ahead. The rulers of Poonch and Supin submitted, while Zabardast Khan remained inside the fort of Tari. At Tari, Zabardast Khan refused to surrender and remained entrenched inside the fort. Rather than delay the main advance, Diwan Chand bypassed the position and left its reduction to Akali Phula Singh and his Akali troops. The Akalis began mining one of the fort walls and succeeded in bringing it down, creating a breach in the defences. The collapse of the wall was taken as the signal for an assault, and the Akalis stormed the fort through the breach and occupied it. Sultan Khan of Bhimber also assisted in the operation.

=== Battle of the Pir Panjal Pass ===
After the capture of Tari, Diwan Chand divided his force into three columns for the advance into the Kashmir Valley, personally accompanying the leading column towards the Pir Panjal Pass. Afghan troops attempted to obstruct its approach by felling trees and placing large rocks across the mountain track, forcing the Sikh troops to clear the route as they advanced. Fighting broke out at the pass, where the Afghan defenders were defeated and forced to withdraw. Diwan Chand then crossed the Pir Panjal and continued towards Shopian.

Soon after descending from the pass, the leading column encountered another Afghan force at Aliabad. The fighting there continued throughout the day before the Afghans left the field. Diwan Chand did not pursue the retreating troops and instead took up a defensive position at Aliabad. The other two Sikh columns subsequently arrived and joined him, while Ranjit Singh had by then advanced to Sadabad.

=== Battle of Shopian ===
After the fighting at Aliabad, Misr Diwan Chand allowed his troops to rest for several days while the Afghan position was reconnoitred and preparations were made for an attack. Jabbar Khan had concentrated his main force around Shopian, where his troops were entrenched. Wali Mohammad Khan, Abdullah Khan and Abdul Rahman were among the Afghan commanders present with him. The date of the battle differs among historians. Hari Ram Gupta, G. M. D. Sufi, Harmeet Sethi and Gulcharan Singh place the battle on 5 July 1819, while Muhammad Yusuf Saraf dates the fighting at Hirpur to 3 July.

The Kashmir Valley viewed from Shopian Hill during Sikh rule, nearly two decades after the 1819 conquest

The Sikh attack opened against the entrenched Afghan position, but the initial artillery fire had little effect. When Diwan Chand moved his guns forward, the Afghans counterattacked and captured two Sikh guns, forcing him back to his former position. He reorganised his troops, shifted the artillery and renewed the attack.

Akali Phula Singh and his Akalis then entered the fighting, which led to close combat. The renewed artillery fire and the Akali assault forced the Afghan troops from their positions. During the battle Jabbar Khan was wounded. His injury was followed by disorder among the Afghan troops, who abandoned the field.

The retreating Afghans left behind supplies, horses, arms and ammunition. Sikh troops pursued them towards Shergarh and occupied the town. Jabbar Khan withdrew from the valley and eventually reached Kabul. Hari Ram Gupta states that he first fled towards Muzaffarabad and then Peshawar, while Parmu claims that he retreated through Srinagar before leaving by the Baramulla–Muzaffarabad route. The defeat of Jabbar Khan left the road to Srinagar open to the Sikh army.

=== Occupation of Srinagar ===
With Jabbar Khan's field army defeated, the Sikh troops proceeded towards Srinagar. Saraf and Pakistani historian Robina Yasmin give 4 July 1819 for the occupation of the city. Gulcharan Singh places the entry on the day after his 5 July battle at Shopian, whereas Hari Ram Gupta and Parmu give 15 July.

Ranjit Singh had ordered his commanders to protect the inhabitants and prohibit looting, killing and burning. These orders were not fully observed. Sikh troops began plundering Srinagar after entering the city, although Diwan Chand intervened and brought the looting to an end.

The Afghan withdrawal left the Khalsa army in possession of the valley. Shergarh and Azamgarh surrendered, and Kashmir was annexed to Ranjit Singh's Empire.

== Aftermath ==
=== Administration ===
In the immediate aftermath of the conquest, Misr Diwan Chand exercised authority over Kashmir under a military administration, while Sham Singh Attariwala and Jawala Singh were placed in charge of Baramulla. Diwan Chand was nominated governor and received the title Zafar Jang. He was subsequently recalled and Diwan Moti Ram was appointed governor of the newly annexed province.

Military posts were established at important points and the remaining Afghan-held positions were gradually cleared. Moti Ram was allotted 20,000 troops for garrison duties, and additional forts in the surrounding country were subsequently reduced.

Misr Diwan Chand was also honoured with the title Fateh-o-Nusrat-Nasib, a jagir valued at 50,000 rupees and a valuable khillat.

Revenue collection was reorganised after the conquest. Bir Bal Dhar received the revenue farm, assessed at between fifty-two and fifty-three lakh rupees. Octroi and other cesses were farmed for a further ten lakh rupees, while the shawl manufacture was also contracted for ten lakh rupees annually. Diwan Devi Das was charged with organising the settlement and revenue assessment, while Fakir Azizuddin and other officials were sent to examine conditions in the valley.

=== Religious restrictions ===
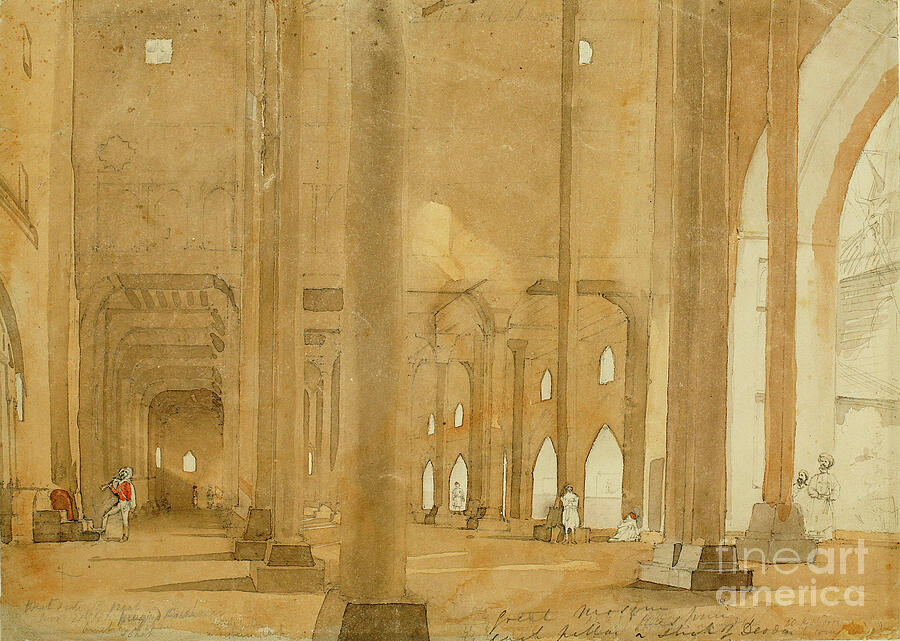
Painting of Sikh soldiers stationed in the Jama Masjid in Srinagar, Kashmir, during Sikh-rule, by Godfrey Thomas Vigne

Restrictions on Muslim religious practice followed the conquest. The Jama Masjid in Srinagar was closed, the public azan was prohibited and cow slaughter was banned. An attempt by Phula Singh to damage the Khanqah Mualla mosque was stopped after the intervention of Misr Diwan Chand and Bir Bal Dhar.

Under Moti Ram, the prohibitions on cow slaughter and the public azan remained in force, and Friday congregational prayers at the Jama Masjid were stopped. Muslims otherwise retained freedom in religious matters.

=== Continuing resistance ===
The capture of Srinagar did not end armed opposition throughout the region. Some Afghan-held positions remained in the valley and were subsequently cleared under Moti Ram. Resistance also continued towards Poonch and Muzaffarabad. Further fighting took place near Uri, where the opposing forces were defeated and several local chiefs were taken prisoner.

=== Revenue and territorial consequences ===
The conquest brought Kashmir under the Sikh Empire and ended Afghan administration in the valley. It also removed the remaining Afghan political presence from the cis-Indus territories.

Sikh-period Kashmir woven shawl, signed by the maker, pink and red colours, Sikh Empire, ca.1840's

Estimates of Kashmir's revenue vary. Ranjit Singh told the British political officer C. M. Wade in 1827 that the province yielded twenty-five lakh rupees annually, a figure also given by Robina Yasmin. Gulcharan Singh gives a considerably higher estimate of about seventy lakh rupees and links the province's income with Srinagar's shawl industry and trade with Ladakh, Iskardo and Tibet.

== Bibliography ==
- Dhillon, Balwant Singh, ed. (2014). "Perspectives on Guru Granth Sahib". Perspectives on Guru Granth Sahib. 9. Centre on Studies in Sri Guru Granth Sahib, Guru Nanak Dev University. ISSN 2393-9745.
- Gupta, Hari Ram (1978). History of the Sikhs: The Sikh Lion of Lahore, Maharaja Ranjit Singh,1799–1839. Vol. 5 (3rd, illustrated ed.). Munshiram Manoharlal. ISBN 978-8121505154.
- Parmu, R. K. (1977). A History of Sikh Rule in Kashmir, 1819–1846. Department of Education, Jammu and Kashmir Government.
- Saraf, Muhammad Yusuf (1977). Kashmiris Fight for Freedom: 1819–1946. Ferozsons.
- Yasmin, Robina (2022). Muslims under Sikh Rule in the Nineteenth Century: Maharaja Ranjit Singh and Religious Tolerance. Library of Islamic South Asia. Bloomsbury Publishing. ISBN 9780755640348.
- Sufi, G. M. D. (1948). Kashīr, Being a History of Kashmir from the Earliest Times to Our Own. Vol. 2. Lahore: University of Panjab.
- Kaur, Rajinder (2011). Role of Select Courtiers and Officials at Lahore Darbar (1799–1849) (PDF) (PhD thesis). Patiala: Punjabi University.
- Sethi, Harmeet (2000). "Maharaja Ranjit Singh's Expedition of 1819: Conquest and Annexation of Kashmir". Panjab Past and Present. 31 (61). Department of Punjab Historical Studies, Punjabi University: 49–52.
- Singh, Gulcharan (1983). "The Kashmir Campaigns of Maharaja Ranjit Singh". The Panjab Past and Present. XVII–I (33). Patiala: Department of Punjab Historical Studies, Punjabi University.
- Hasrat, Bikrama Jit (1977). Life and Times of Ranjit Singh: A Saga of Benevolent Despotism. Hoshiarpur: V. V. Research Institute Book Agency.
- Chhabra, G. S. (1962). The Advanced Study in History of the Punjab. Vol. 2. Sharanjit.
