= Battle of Baramulla (1814) =

1814 engagement during Ranjit Singh's Kashmir expedition

- Part of the Battle of Kashmir (1814)
| Date | 24 July 1814 and following days |
| Location | Baramulla, Kashmir, India 34.198°N 74.364°E |
| Result | Sikh victory: The Sikh detachment later withdrew safely under negotiated terms |

Belligerents
| Sikh Empire | Durrani Empire |

Commanders and leaders
| Ram Dayal; Dal Singh; Raja Khan; Jiwan Mai †; Mit Singh †; Relief force: Bhai Singh; Dewan Dass; Qutb-ud-Din | Mohammad Khan; Shakur Khan; Raja Khan |

Strength
| About 10,000 Sikh ghorcharhas Relief force: 4,000 men 5,000 horse | Unknown |

Casualties and losses
| Unknown | 2,000 killed |

The Battle of Baramulla was an engagement fought in 1814 during Ranjit Singh's expedition toward Kashmir. The action formed part of Ram Dayal's advance through the Bahramgala route and the Pir Panjal into the Kashmir Valley. Ram Dayal captured Baramulla after reaching it on 24 July 1814, entrenched his force there, and repulsed an attack by Mohammad Azim Khan, the Afghan governor of Kashmir.

The battle occurred after the Sikh campaign had suffered difficulties in the mountains, including hostile resistance, bad weather, losses among commanders, and uncertainty over Ram Dayal's position. Although Ram Dayal did not secure the complete occupation of Kashmir, the fighting ended with Mohammad Azim Khan negotiating his safe withdrawal.

== Background ==
In April 1814, Ranjit Singh mobilised the Khalsa Army for another expedition against Kashmir. Tributary chiefs were ordered to join the Sikh army with their contingents, and the Maharaja inspected the assembled army at Wazirabad. The Sikh army reached Rajauri on 11 June 1814.

The campaign was divided into two main routes. Ranjit Singh moved by way of Poonch, while Ram Dayal, grandson of Diwan Mohkam Chand, advanced through Bahramgala. Ram Dayal's force consisted of about 10,000 Sikh ghorcharhas, irregular troops of jagirdars. His column included contingents or auxiliaries associated with Kanwar Kharak Singh, Bhai Ram Singh and Raja Aghar Khan of Rajouri. At Thanna, his force was reinforced by contingents under Sardar Dal Singh Bharania and Mit Singh, who had advanced from Poonch.

=== Advance through Bahramgala and Pir Panjal ===
Ram Dayal reached the entrance of the Bahramgala Pass on 18 June 1814. The troops defending the pass were won over with bribes, and Ram Dayal crossed it on 26 June. Ram Dayal, accompanied by Jiwal Mai, Dal Singh and their contingents, captured Behram Gala, established a thana there, and took possession of the Pir Panjal hills.

The advance met resistance after the passage through the mountains. A Kashmir division checked Ram Dayal's movement, and an Afghan column later blocked his passage into the valley. The route beyond Thanna became dangerous because of enemy fire, heavy rain and hail. Raja Aghar Khan of Rajouri, attached to the column as an auxiliary, instigated his troops to attack the Punjab troops. Several men were killed or wounded, Mit Singh died, and ammunition and military equipment were looted.

== Battle ==
Ram Dayal and Sardar Dal Singh Bharania escaped with surviving troops by narrow and less frequented paths under the guidance of Shama Raja Kaka. They reached Hirapore, where Azim Khan's troops surrounded them. Severe fighting between Ram Dayal's forces and Azim Khan's forces took place on 24 June 1814, followed by further fighting at Shopian. Jiwan Mai, an officer of Prince Kharak Singh, and Mit Singh Padhania were killed during these operations, and Sardar Jawala Singh received Mit Singh's place after his death.

Ram Dayal descended upon Baramula on 24 July 1814. The town was defended by Shakur Khan. Within a few days Ram Dayal captured the town and took up an entrenched position there. After Ranjit Singh began retreating toward Poonch, Mohammad Azim Khan moved quickly to Baramulla and launched an attack against the Sikh force.

Ram Dayal maintained his entrenched position and prevented men from leaving his camp. The Afghan attack was repulsed, and 2,000 Afghans were killed. Local opposition to Afghan rule aided Ram Dayal's position. Azim Khan was reluctant to remain at Baramulla for long because of the possibility of Sikh reinforcements and local revolt.

=== Relief efforts and Sikh withdrawal ===
Ram Dayal sent urgent messengers to Ranjit Singh requesting men, money and supplies. The request reached Ranjit Singh while he was withdrawing toward Poonch. Bhai Ram Singh had already reached Thanna with a reinforcement of 4,000 troops and provisions intended for Ram Dayal. On seeing fleeing troops, Bhai Ram Singh ordered his men to return to Rajouri without determining Ram Dayal's position or deploying his own troops for Ram Dayal's relief. He also advised Ranjit Singh, then still in Poonch, to leave the area to avoid severe consequences.

Ranjit Singh sent a well-provisioned relief contingent of 5,000 horse and foot under Dewan Devi Dass and Nawab Qutb-ud-Din of Kasur. The deteriorating situation forced Ranjit Singh to leave Poonch on 30 July 1814, and he reached Lahore on 11 August.

== Settlement ==
Azim Khan opened negotiations with Ram Dayal. Earlier relations with Diwan Mohkam Chand, Ram Dayal's grandfather, were invoked during the negotiations, and Ram Dayal received safe and unmolested passage from the valley. Mohkam Chand had defeated Azim Khan's brothers, Wazir Fatah Khan and Dost Muhammad Khan, at Haidru near Attock on 9 July 1813. Ram Dayal defeated Afghan forces in more than one action but did not complete the occupation of Kashmir. Azim Khan also sent presents for Ranjit Singh and gave assurances of goodwill or obedience toward the Maharaja and his state. Ram Dayal returned safely to Lahore.

Wazir Fatah Khan was angered by Azim Khan's decision to let Ram Dayal and other valuable opponents leave safely. Fatah Khan was also enraged by Azim Khan's nominal submission to Ranjit Singh, while Ranjit Singh viewed the arrangement as an acknowledgement of his overlordship over Kashmir. Azim Khan later conciliated his brother.

== Bibliography ==
- Gupta, Hari Ram (1978). History of the Sikhs: The Sikh Lion of Lahore, Maharaja Ranjit Singh, 1799–1839. History of the Sikhs. Vol. 5 (3rd, illustrated ed.). Munshiram Manoharlal. ISBN 9788121505154.
- Lafont, Jean Marie (2002). Maharaja Ranjit Singh. Atlantic Publishers & Distri.
- Nayyar, G. S., ed. (1990). The Panjab Past and Present. Vol. 24. Department of Punjab Historical Studies, Punjabi University.
- Parmu, R. K. (1977). A History of Sikh Rule in Kashmir, 1819–1846. Department of Education, Jammu and Kashmir Government.
- Siṅgha, Bhagata (1993). A History of the Sikh Misals. Punjab, India: Publication Bureau, Punjabi University.
