= Battle of Nowshera =

1823 Sikh–Afghan battle

- Part of Afghan-Sikh Wars
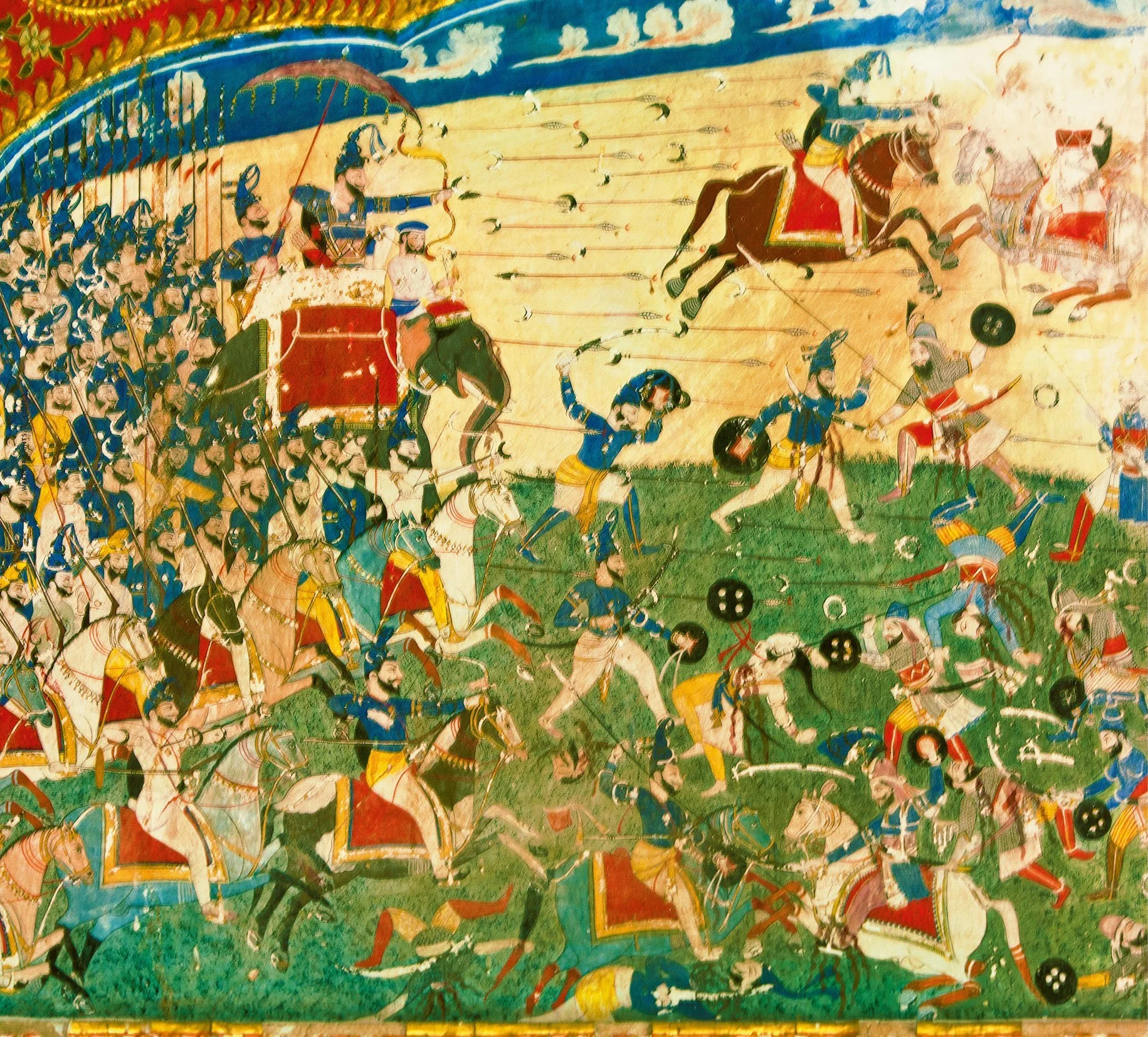
- Fresco in Jammu depicting Akali Phula Singh and his Akali-Nihang warriors giving a last stand to Afghan Ghazi warriors in the Battle of Nowshera
Date	14 March 1823
Location	Tihri / Pir Sabaq, near Nowshera, on the Kabul River
Result	Sikh victory
Territorial changes	Sikh authority west of the Indus River consolidated; Peshawar remained under a tributary arrangement with the Sikh Empire

Belligerents
Sikh Empire	Azim Khan Coalition: Yusufzai tribesmen; Khattak tribesmen; Afridi tribesmen; Durrani, Ghilzai, Kohistani tribesmen

Commanders and leaders
Ranjit Singh; Sher Singh; Kharak Singh; Hari Singh Nalwa; Misr Diwan Chand; Jamadar Khushhal Singh; Jean-Baptiste Ventura; Jean-François Allard; Diwan Kirpa Ram; Attar Singh Sandhanwalia; Dhana Singh Malwai; Budh Singh Sandhanwalia; Akali Phula Singh †; Balbhadra Kunwar †; Sahaye Singh †; Mahan Singh †	Mohammad Azim Khan; Dost Mohammad Khan; Nawab Jabbar Khan; Abdul Samad Khan; Sayed Akbar Shah; Muhammad Akbar; Muhammad Zaman Khan; Shaikh Muhammad Shoaib †; Feroz Khan Khattak †; Noroz Khan Khattak †

Strength
Estimates vary: 20,000–25,000 troops; 25,000 Sikh troops	Estimates vary: 20,000–25,000 Afghan-Pakhtun troops; 20,000 tribal levies at Pir Sabak; 45,000 Khattak and Yusufzai volunteers

Casualties and losses
2,000-5,000 killed	3,000-10,000 killed

The Battle of Nowshera, (Note: Pashto: د نوښار جګړه; Punjabi: ਨੌਸ਼ਹਿਰ ਦੀ ਲੜਾਈ (Gurmukhi), نوشہرہ دی لڑائی (Shahmukhi)) also called the Battle of Tihri, Battle of Naushahra, or Battle of Pir Sabaq, was fought in March 1823 near Nowshera between the forces of Ranjit Singh and Afghan-Pashtun forces led by Mohammad Azim Khan, then a leading Barakzai figure in Afghan politics. The battle followed Sikh expansion across the Indus River, the temporary Sikh occupation of Peshawar in 1818, and the submission of Yar Muhammad Khan of Peshawar to the Lahore Darbar.

The battle ended in a Sikh victory after intense fighting around the hill or mound at Tihri/Pir Sabaq. Akali Phula Singh and Balbhadra Kunwar were killed on the Sikh side, while the Khattak, Yusufzai, Afridi and other tribal forces suffered heavy losses. Muhammad Azim Khan withdrew from the field and died soon afterward, with Historians giving different explanations for his death. The victory strengthened Sikh power west of the Indus and reduced Afghan influence between the Indus and the Khyber region.

== Background ==
=== Peshawar and the Afghan succession conflicts ===
The Peshawar Valley had formed part of the Mughal Subah-i-Kabul wa Peshawar until the occupation of the region by Nadir Shah Afshar in 1738. Ahmad Shah Abdali established an Afghan tribal confederation in 1747, but after the death of Timur Shah the Saddozai princes entered prolonged succession struggles. By the early nineteenth century, the Barakzai brothers had become increasingly influential in Afghan politics, while Ranjit Singh had emerged as the dominant ruler in the Punjab.

The Treaty of Amritsar of 1809 fixed the Sutlej as the boundary between Ranjit Singh's Sikh Empire and the British East India Company, which helped direct Sikh expansion toward the north and west of the river. By 1813, the Sikh Empire had become a major power west of the Sutlej, and Sikh control had extended into areas formerly attached to Afghan authority.

In August 1818, Wazir Fatah Khan was killed after being seized and blinded by Kamran, son of Shah Mahmud. His death accelerated the fragmentation of Afghan authority and provoked the Barakzai brothers to seek revenge. Mohammad Azim Khan, then governor of Kashmir, left the valley, defeated Kamran, proclaimed Ayub Khan as sovereign, and participated in the Barakzai division of Afghan provinces. The political disruption in Afghanistan created an opening for Sikh operations across the Indus.

=== Sikh occupation of Peshawar in 1818 ===
In October 1818, Ranjit Singh captured Khairabad and nearby territory on the western bank of the Indus from Firoz Khan, the Khattak chief. Sikh forces also took Jahangira and Khairabad after Khattak chiefs killed Sikh representatives sent under Bawa Phaddi. Sham Singh reported that Peshawar lacked an organized army, and Ranjit Singh advanced on the city.

Peshawar was occupied by Sikh forces on 20 November 1818, while its governor Yar Muhammad Khan Barakzai fled into Yusufzai territory or Ashnaghar. The leading chiefs and citizens paid a tribute or nazarana of 25,000 rupees, which prevented the city from being pillaged in 1818. Fourteen heavy Afghan guns were removed from Peshawar, and Jahandad Khan, the former governor or faujdar of Attock, was appointed to administer the city. The Sikh army did not leave him a strong garrison or adequate war material, and Yar Muhammad Khan soon expelled Jahandad Khan and recovered Peshawar.

After this first occupation, Ranjit Singh did not immediately move against Yar Muhammad Khan. In 1818, the conquest of Multan ended Saddozai authority there after an 82-day siege, during which Muzaffar Khan Saddozai and several members of his family died in the defence of the city. In 1819, the Sikh Empire conquered Kashmir and Dera Ghazi Khan, while refugees from these conquests moved toward Kabul. In the following years, Sikh operations brought Dera Ismail Khan, Bannu, Tank, Darband and Mankera under Sikh influence or control.

Yar Muhammad Khan later accepted a tributary relationship with the Sikh Empire. One account records a June 1822 payment of 40,000 rupees in cash and several horses, followed by an agreement for an annual payment of 20,000 rupees. Another account records a mission by Hafiz Rohullah to Lahore and a payment of one lakh rupees as a token of tributary acceptance. A further account records that only part of a larger expected tribute was paid, along with the gift of a horse.

== Prelude ==
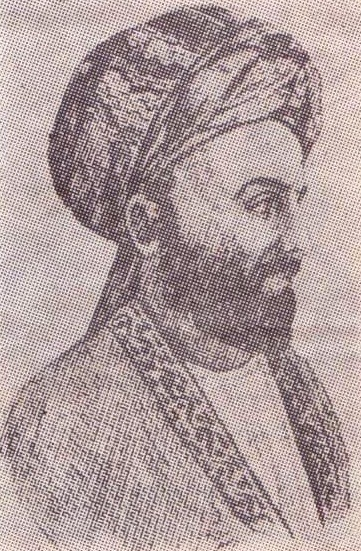
Portrait of Mohammad Azim Khan, a Barakzai chief

Mohammad Azim Khan rejected Yar Muhammad Khan's submission to Ranjit Singh and sought to reassert Afghan authority over Peshawar and the trans-Indus districts. In 1822 he moved into Peshawar, condemned Yar Muhammad Khan's conduct, and called for a religious war against the Sikhs. Sayyids, mullahs and pirs encouraged Yusufzai, Khattak, Afridi and other tribesmen to assemble against the Sikh forces.

Mohammad Azim Khan's brothers and relatives played important roles in the mobilization. Dost Muhammad Khan and Jabbar Khan helped organize the tribal forces, while Samad Khan or Abdul Samad Khan raised a separate body of ghazis drawn from Khattak and Yusufzai groups. Muhammad Zaman Khan, another relative of Azim Khan, destroyed the bridge at Attock before the Sikhs could cross, forcing Sikh troops to find another crossing while under fire.

Sayed Akbar Shah, a descendant of Pir Baba, was prominent among the religious leaders who encouraged the tribal mobilization. The tribal contingents included Yusufzai and Mandar leaders from Ismaila, Shewa, Zaida, Galyarha, Toru, Kalabat, Hund, Hoti, Jamal Gharay, Rustam and Totalay. Religious figures who participated included Shaikh Muhammad Shoaib, popularly known as Todery Baba, and followers of Akhund Abdul Ghafoor, later known as Saidu Baba. Some levies were poorly trained and lightly armed, and boys as young as twelve joined the tribal forces with knives or daggers.

Ranjit Singh responded by sending forces under Prince Sher Singh and other commanders, including Hari Singh Nalwa, Attar Singh Sandhanwalia, Dhana Singh Malwai, Diwan Kirpa Ram, and infantry trained by European officers such as Ventura and Allard. Misr Diwan Chand and Ranjit Singh followed with additional troops, and Historian Hasrat states columns under Prince Kharak Singh and Misr Diwan Chand converging on Nowshera. Ranjit Singh crossed the Indus on 13 March 1823 with a strong army and heavy artillery. Jai Singh Atariwala, who had previously gone over to Dost Muhammad Khan, sought Ranjit Singh's pardon and rejoined him before the battle.

== Opposing forces ==
Estimates of the armies differ. Bikrama Jit Hasrat gives both the Sikh army and the Afghan or mujahideen forces as roughly equal, about 20,000 to 25,000 men. Tariq and Qadir record a Sikh official estimate of 45,000 Khattak and Yusufzai volunteers under Sayed Akbar Shah and Abdul Samad Khan, with 25,000 Sikh troops under General Ventura, while also noting that most accounts put the opposing forces at about 20,000 Pakhtuns and 25,000 Sikhs. Historian Jonathan Lee gives 20,000 tribal levies on the hill of Pir Sabak and points out the Sikh advantages in numbers, artillery, and European-trained formations.

Ranjit Singh divided his army into two main bodies. One division, led by himself with Misr Diwan Chand, Balbhadra Kunwar and Akali Phula Singh, faced the Yusufzai and Khattak forces at Tihri. The other division, including Hari Singh Nalwa, Jamadar Khushhal Singh, Sher Singh, Budh Singh Sandhanwalia and Ventura, was assigned to prevent Mohammad Azim Khan from crossing the Kabul River and joining the ghazis. Ventura and Allard were also placed with eight platoons and two guns to block Azim Khan from the Nowshera Chahan side.

The Afghan-Pashtun side was divided by the Kabul River. The tribal ghazis were placed on the left bank of the river at or near Pir Sabak/Tihri, while Mohammad Azim Khan remained on the opposite bank with Durrani, Ghilzai, Kohistani and household troops. This separation prevented the two wings from easily supporting each other during the fighting. The decision may have been intended to protect Azim Khan's rear against the Sikh garrison at Khairabad, which had already defeated an Afghan force at Jehangira.

== Battle ==
=== Opening movements ===
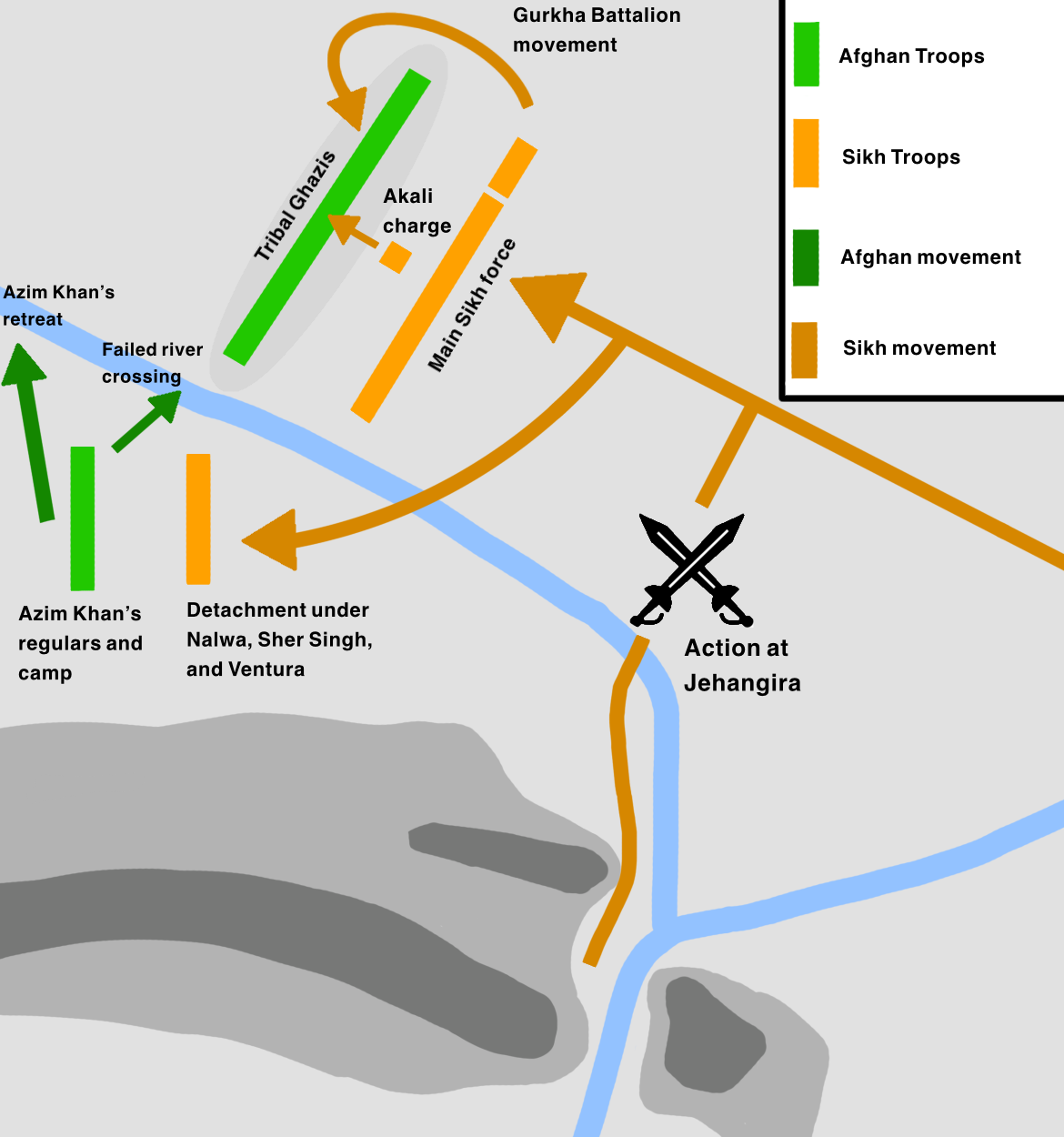
Map showing the movements and positions of the Afghan and Sikh armies during the battle

The Yusufzai and Khattak forces took position at Tihri, on the left bank of the Kabul River, about two kilometres from Nowshera toward Peshawar. The Afghan irregulars occupied high ground at Naushera or the hill of Teri, while Azim Khan encamped on the right bank of the Kabul River, a few kilometres from Tihri. His brothers and associates organized the tribal forces, while Azim Khan remained apart from the main fighting near Chamkawa, about five miles east of Peshawar.

The first Sikh movements did not immediately dislodge the tribal forces. Sikh troops attempting to climb the hill came under heavy fire and stone-throwing from above, and Sahaye Singh was killed by a shot to the head while Mahan Singh was stabbed. The Sikh advance faltered, and part of the army retreated. Ranjit Singh ordered commanders to stop fleeing troops and personally directed a renewed attack with infantry, reserve troops and other formations.

=== Akali Nihang Offensive ===
Akali Phula Singh's charge became central to the battle narrative. At a stage when the Sikh line was under severe pressure, Phula Singh advanced toward the hill with a smaller Akali force and called on the wider army to follow him. The Akalis dismounted and drove their horses toward the opposing fighters before engaging at close quarters, producing confusion in the Afghan-Pashtun ranks. War cries from both sides were shout in the fighting, including Sikh invocations of Sat Sri Akal and Muslim invocations such as Ya Allah and Allah-o-Akbar.

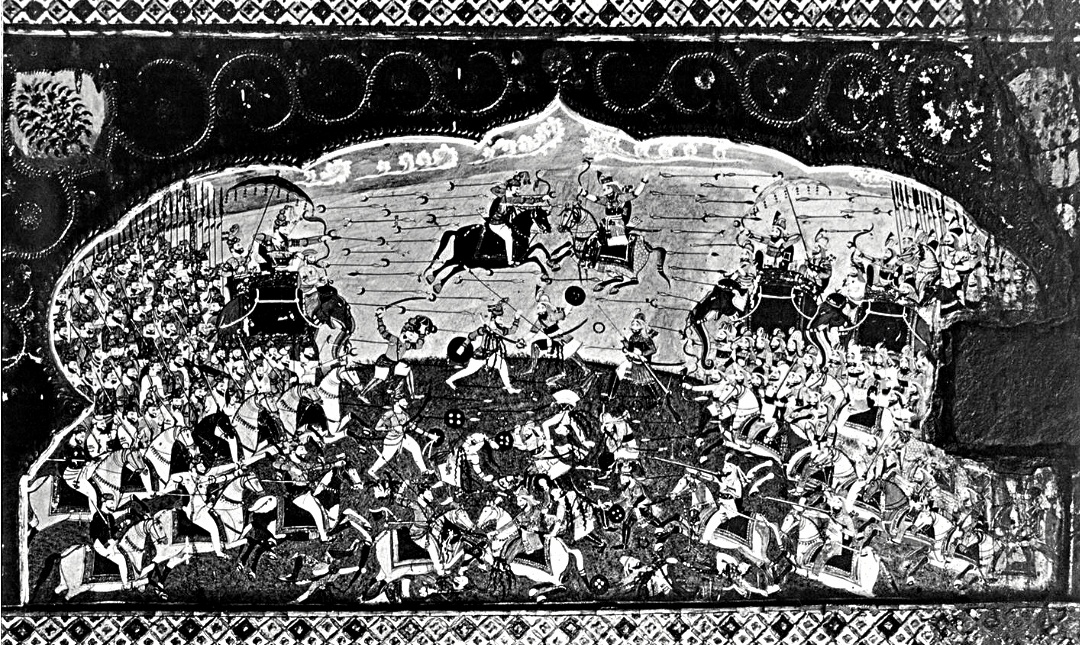
Full view of a mural depicting Akali Phula Singh atop an elephant with Sikh troops engaging hostile Afghan forces during the Battle of Nowshera, from Jammu, ca.1823–1849

Phula Singh was killed during the fighting on or near the hill. One detailed narrative records that he continued the attack from an elephant after being struck from his horse, and that he was killed by matchlock fire while leading his followers forward. Tariq and Qadir record that Phula Singh, Gurba Singh Manas, Karam Singh Chahal and Balbhadra Kunwar were killed with about 200 men during the counterattack.

=== Containment of Mohammad Azim Khan ===
While the main struggle took place around Tihri/Pir Sabaq, a Sikh detachment held Mohammad Azim Khan on the opposite side of the Kabul River. The division under Hari Singh Nalwa, Sher Singh, Ventura and other commanders prevented Azim Khan from joining the ghazis. Jonathan Lee states that Ventura crossed the river to confront Azim Khan, where initial skirmishing took place, Ventura then withdrew, drawing an Afghan cavalry charge into Sikh artillery fire from the opposite bank. This artillery fire caused Azim Khan's force to break and retreat.

Attempts to send help across the river failed. Boats carrying reinforcements capsized, causing many men to drown or be swept away and five boats sent by Azim Khan were also struck by Ventura's force and sank in the river. One explanation for Azim Khan's withdrawal links it to a rumour spread by Ranjit Singh that Azim Khan's harem and treasury had been captured at Mechani, which drew his attention away from the battlefield. Other explanations include concern for his treasure, fear of assassination after Yar Muhammad Khan's defection and Shah Shuja's support for the Sikhs, distrust of the Khyber ghazis, and fear of being cut off by Sikh attacks.

=== Final phase ===
The fighting continued with repeated assaults, artillery fire and close combat. The tribal forces initially resisted Sikh attacks and at times forced Sikh troops back from the hill. Ranjit Singh personally led or ordered renewed attacks, and the Sikh army eventually brought artillery, infantry and cavalry pressure to bear on the tribal position.

The surviving ghazis were eventually driven from the hill and routed. After hours of fighting, Ranjit Singh led a cavalry reserve charge when the Sikh infantry began to waver, after which the surviving tribal fighters fled under pursuit. About 200 Yusufzais made a final stand on Pir Sabak under Muhammad Akbar and were killed. Tariq and Qadir state that the battle lasted two days and one night, while Hari Ram Gupta treats the decisive battle as occurring on 14 March 1823.

== Casualties ==
Casualty figures differ substantially among Historians. Hari Ram Gupta gives one figure of about 3,000 tribal dead and wounded and about 2,000 Sikh dead, including Akali Phula Singh and Balbhadra Kunwar. In another passage, Gupta gives about 5,000 Sikh losses and twice that number for the Afghan side. Chhabra gives about 4,000 Pashtuns and 2,000 Sikhs killed. Tariq and Qadir record Captain Wade's estimate of 2,000 Sikhs and 3,000 Pashtuns killed, and also record another figure of 3,000 Muslims and 2,500 troops of Ranjit Singh killed at Nowshera.

Several named Sikh commanders were killed, including Akali Phula Singh, Balbhadra Kunwar, Garbha Singh, Gurba Singh Manas and Karam Singh Chahal. Shaikh Muhammad Shoaib, the Muslim spiritual figure known as Todery Baba, was fatally wounded and died on 27 March 1823. Khattak losses included chiefs such as Feroz Khan Khattak and Noroz Khan Khattak, and later memory of the battle was associated with numerous graves near the Kabul River, the Grand Trunk Road and Nowshera Kalan.

== Aftermath ==
=== Peshawar and frontier settlement ===
After the victory, Sikh forces entered or re-entered Peshawar and reasserted control over the surrounding region. The victorious army entered Peshawar on 17 March and the city was plundered, and Sikh troops advanced toward the Khyber Pass. Ranjit Singh later re-entered Peshawar on 6 March 1824 and was received by its inhabitants. Peshawar was occupied, the surrounding countryside was plundered, Yar Muhammad Khan was reinstated as governor, and a Sikh garrison was placed in the citadel.

The post-battle settlement kept Peshawar under a tributary arrangement rather than direct full annexation. Yar Muhammad Khan remained or was restored as governor under the Lahore Darbar. Dost Muhammad Khan and Yar Muhammad Khan came before Ranjit Singh, offered submission, apologized for their earlier conduct, and promised to hold the Peshawar territory on his behalf in return for a tribute of 1,10,000 rupees. Ranjit Singh accepted the arrangement and returned to Lahore in April 1824. Chhabra also gives the annual tribute as 1,10,000 rupees. Hasrat gives the later division of the province into five districts under Yar Muhammad, Sultan Muhammad, Sayyed Muhammad, Samad Khan and Pir Muhammad Khan, each under nominal tribute. Yar Muhammad Khan, Sultan Muhammad Khan, Pir Muhammad Khan and Said Muhammad Khan also acknowledged Ranjit Singh's overlordship and paid annual tribute.

Sikh troops also captured arms in the region. The captured arms included 14 large and 18 small guns from newly acquired territory after the battle. Subsequent Sikh operations caused the destruction of Nowshera Kalan, Pabbi and Jalozai, and with damage to older Mughal and Pakhtun structures, including Bala Hisar.

=== Death of Mohammad Azim Khan ===
Mohammad Azim Khan withdrew after the defeat and died soon afterward, but the cause and location of his death differ. Gupta and Chhabra associate his death to grief, disgrace or heart failure after the defeat. Jonathan Lee states that he fled to Jalalabad and died of cholera. Tariq and Qadir record variant traditions that he committed suicide by poison in Kabul, or died at Lata Band village on the road to Kabul after stress and excessive drinking. Gupta also states that he entrusted his property and jewellery to his son Habibullah Khan and urged him to remove the disgrace attached to the defeat.

=== Afghan political consequences ===
The death of Mohammad Azim Khan intensified struggles among the Barakzai and Saddozai factions. Jonathan Lee states that Azim Khan proclaimed his son Habib Allah Khan as the new wazir under the tutelage of Nawab Jabbar Khan, but Dost Muhammad Khan and the Jawanshir Qizilbash rejected this arrangement. Habib Allah Khan then sought help from the Kandahar sardars, while fighting in Kabul led to the death of Isma'il Mirza, the looting of royal palaces, and the humiliation and exile of Shah Ayub. Hundreds of Saddozais subsequently followed Shah Ayub into exile.

The exile of Shah Ayub marked the end of effective Durrani/Saddozai power in Kabul, though Shah Mahmud and Kamran continued to hold Herat. By 1824, the Afghan civil war that followed the death of Timur Shah had lasted for more than three decades, and much of the former Durrani kingdom had been lost to the Sikhs, Persians or Uzbeks. Hasrat similarly presents the battle and its aftermath as part of the dismemberment of Afghanistan, with Kabul, Kandahar, Herat, Peshawar, Sind, Kashmir, Multan, Derajat, Attock and Rawalpindi no longer forming part of a unified Durrani imperial structure by the mid-1820s.

== Significance ==
The battle has been presented as a decisive event in the shift of power west of the Indus. Hari Ram Gupta compares its effect west of the Indus to the earlier Sikh success at Haidru east of the river. Chhabra similarly states that the campaign established Sikh power between the Indus and Peshawar. Jonathan Lee presents the battle as ending Durrani sovereignty, though not all Afghan government, between the Indus and the Khyber, and as establishing the Sikhs as the dominant military power in the region. Hasrat records that the victory struck a major blow to Afghan supremacy beyond the Indus and left Peshawar as a dependency of Lahore.

The battle also affected tribal military capacity and frontier politics. Jonathan Lee states that the deaths of thousands of Khattaks, Yusufzais and Afridis weakened their ability or willingness to resist Sikh occupation of Peshawar. Tariq and Qadir point out the effect of artillery, military discipline and organized state support on the outcome, contrasting the trained Sikh forces with the less organized tribal lashkar. The same Journal links the defeat to later distrust among frontier tribes toward Muhammadzai leadership, especially after Azim Khan's failure to join the tribal fighters.

== Memory and commemorations ==
A samadh or memorial was erected for Akali Phula Singh at or near the place where he fell, and the site became associated with pilgrimage and local veneration. Gupta mentions that a gurdwara and a tomb were built in his memory near the battlefield, while Tariq and Qadir place his tomb at Pir Sabaq, Nowshera. Shaikh Muhammad Shoaib's shrine is placed at Tordher village in Swabi.

The battle also entered Pashtun memory through graves, shrines and poetry. Moeze, a poet and participant in the battle, composed a long epic that became known in Pakhtun literature and praised the role of tribes and clans including Akozai, Salarzai, Khudu Khel, Ghadaizai, Norezai, Ashezai, Ismailzai, Akhund Khel and Yusufzai. The graves associated with the battle include the pinzapiran, or five pirs, identified as Faiz Talab, Altaf Khan, Sherdad, Muhibullah and Pir Khan, sons of Sarwar Khan. Collective graves known as chihalgazi in Nowshera Kalan and other burial places near the Kabul River are also linked with those killed in the battle.

== Sources ==
- Chhabra, G. S. (1962). The Advanced Study in History of the Punjab: Ranjit Singh & Post Ranjit Singh Period. The Advanced Study in History of the Punjab. Vol. 2. Sharanjit.
- Gupta, Hari Ram (1978). History of the Sikhs: The Sikh Lion of Lahore, Maharaja Ranjit Singh, 1799–1839. History of the Sikhs. Vol. 5 (3rd, illustrated ed.). Munshiram Manoharlal. ISBN 9788121505154.
- Hasrat, Bikrama Jit (1977). Life and Times of Ranjit Singh: A Saga of Benevolent Despotism. V.V. Research Institute Book Agency.
- Lee, Jonathan (2019). Afghanistan: A History from 1260 to the Present. Reaktion Books. ISBN 9781789140101.
- Tariq, M.; Qadir, A. (2020). "Sikh-Pakhtuns Clashes in the Frontier: Assessing the Battle of Pir Sabaq, Nowshera 1823". Journal of the Pakistan Historical Society. 68 (1): 81–95.
- Lafont, Jean Marie (2002). Maharaja Ranjit Singh. Atlantic Publishers & Distri.
