= Ruhullah Khan of Poonch =

19th-century ruler of Poonch

Ruhullah Khan
- Ghazi; Wazir

Raja of Poonch
- Reign: 1797 – 1819
- Predecessor: Amir Khan
- Successor: Mir Baz Khan
- Born: 18th century Muzaffarabad, Durrani Empire (present-day Azad Kashmir, Pakistan)
- Died: 1819; Poonch
- Issue: Amir Khan
- Dynasty: Sangu
- Father: Sami Mittha
- Religion: Islam
- Military career
- Conflicts: Afghan–Sikh Wars; Battle of Kashmir (1814); Battle of Rajauri; Battle of Toshamaidan Pass; Siege of Bahramgalla

Ruhullah Khan (Punjabi: رُوحُ اللّٰہ خان, romanized: Rūḥullāh Khān) (died 1819) was the Raja of Poonch from 1797 to 1819. He is known for his resistance against the campaigns of Ranjit Singh in Kashmir.

== Early life ==
Ruhullah Khan belonged to the Sangu clan of Gujjars. During the reign of Raja Rustam Khan, his father Sami Mittha, migrated from Muzaffarabad and settled in Poonch, and Ruhullah entered into the service of Raja Rustam Khan.

== Rise to power ==
During the reign of Raja Bahadur Khan, Ruhullah rose to such prominence that he was appointed the post of Wazir. In 1797, Abdullah Khan, the Nazim of Kashmir, attacked Poonch and appointed Wazir Ruhullah Khan as its ruler.

== Reign ==
Ruhullah Khan's son, Amir Khan, assumed the kingship of Poonch, while Ruhullah Khan continued to serve as Wazir during his son's reign.

=== Conflict with the Sikhs ===
Ruhullah Khan promised assistance to Raja Agar Khan of Rajouri in case of a Sikh invasion. In 1813, Ranjit Singh attacked Rajauri, and Ruhullah Khan with all his available troops, proceeded to aid Agar Khan. A battle ensued, which remained undecided, and, in consequence, Ranjit Singh's troops returned to Lahore without success.

In 1814, Ranjit Singh sent letters to Ruhullah Khan and Aghar Khan, calling upon them to present themselves to him immediately, and informing them that in case they made delay they would be made to suffer, for then he would first turn them out and proceed to conquer Kashmir afterwards; but Ruhullah Khan pleaded engagements with Kashmir. On the 29th of July, Ruhullah Khan approached and commenced a desultory fire on the Sikh position and Ranjit Singh was compelled to fall back on Mandi with a loss of above 600 men, with several principal leaders, and was stripped of nearly all of his baggage. The Poonch Raja then attacked and besieged the Bahramgalla Fort. He established such entrenchments around the fort that no water or grain could reach the Qilahdar, Diwan Singh, from outside, who had nothing else but grain left with him, and therefore grew helpless and felt hard-pressed, and was thus forced to surrender the fort. Ruhullah Khan also destroyed an immense number of the retreating enemy. It was stated that out of the company of the Sikhs, which had gone over to the mountains for bringing about the evacuation of the fort, only two men had returned and nothing was known about the whereabouts of the rest.

In recognition of his services, Azim Khan, Governor of Kashmir, granted Ruhullah Khan a robe of honour, a bejeweled turban, and 50,000 rupees in cash.

== Death ==
Ruhullah Khan died in 1819 and was succeeded by his grandson Mir Baz Khan. Kashmiri historian Muhammad Din Fauq described Ruhullah Khan as a remarkable and brave ruler.
