= Ilahi Bakhsh =

Sikh Empire general and artillery officer

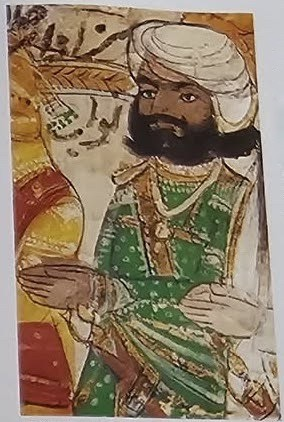
- Died: 1849; Chillianwala, Punjab, Sikh Empire (present-day Punjab, Pakistan)
- Relatives: Fateh Khan (son); Sikander Khan (son); Madad Khan (son)
- Military career
- Allegiance: Sikh Empire
- Branch: Sikh Khalsa Army
- Service years: 1802-1849
- Rank: Jarnail

Ilahi Bakhsh (Punjabi: الٰہی بخش) was a Punjabi Muslim general who served in the Punjabi Sikh Khalsa Fauj for over forty years and was regarded as one of the best artillery officers.

== Biography ==
He entered the service of the army in 1802. Following a re-organization of the army in 1810, Bakhsh was transferred to a new artillery corps, the Fauj-i-Khas, led by Mian Ghaus Khan. In 1814 he was placed in command of a special wing of artillery named the Derah-i-Ilahi. In 1818 he assisted Misr Diwan Chand at the Battle of Multan. He was later employed in the pacification of Hazara and Dera Ghazi Khan. He fought at the Battle of Nowshera in March 1823.

In 1831 at the Ropar meeting between Maharaja Ranjit Singh and Lord William Bentinck, the Governor-General of India, he arranged a demonstration of his artillery as well as of his own firing skill in the course of evening entertainments and the review of troops.

In the beginning of January 1844, he was removed from his command in suspicion of corresponding with Jawahar Singh and Suchet Singh but was restored to his command a few days later.

He was present at many of the battles during the First Anglo-Sikh War and Second Anglo-Sikh War. He played a key role at the Battle of Chillianwala, one of the bloodiest British battles fought in India. Three days after the battle, Ilahi Bakhsh defected to the British, possibly due to a monetary incentive from the British. The defection of Bakhsh dealt a blow to the Sikh artillery and they capitulated to the British the following month at Gujrat. He died in the Battle of Chillianwala in 1849.

== Family ==
His sons Fateh Khan, Sikander Khan and Madad Khan all achieved distinction as officers in the Sikh Army. Sikander succeeded his father as Chief of the Artillery and later inherited substantial properties in Lahore. Fateh died whilst fighting at the Battle of Mudki, and Madad was killed at the Battle of Chillianwala. His Grandson was the famous Raja of Chillianwala Ch. Tuman Khan, the father of Raja Sardar Khan of Chillianwala. His great-granddaughter married the founder of the Unionist Party, Sir Fazl-i-Hussain.
