= Ram Dayal (Sikh official) =

Sikh general and administrator (1792–1820)

Governor of Hazara
- In office 1819–1820
- Monarch: Ranjit Singh
- Preceded by: Sardar Hukma Singh
- Succeeded by: Amar Singh Majithia

Personal details
- Born: 1792
- Died: 1820 (aged 27–28) Hazara, Sikh Empire
- Parent: Diwan Moti Ram

Military service
- Battles/wars: Battle of Kashmir; Battle of Shopian; Siege of Multan (1818)

Diwan Ram Dayal was the governor of the Hazara region in the Sikh Empire from 1819 until his death in 1820 while quelling a rebellion by the Yusufzai tribe of the Pashtuns.

== Early life ==
Diwan Ram Dayal was the grandson of Dewan Mokham Chand, the oldest son of Diwan Moti Ram and the older brother of Diwan Kirpa Ram. The family came from Kunjah. Born into a family with a military background, he quickly distinguished himself, displaying bravery and strategic insight from a young age.

== Military career ==
In 1814, Maharaja Ranjit Singh decided to invade Kashmir. Diwan Ram Dayal, only 22 at the time, and already distinguished for his ability and bravery, was appointed to lead one division of the Sikh army.

Diwan Mokham Chand had led the Sikh army into Kashmir in 1812. He cautioned Ranjit Singh about going to the valley at that particular time of the year. However, Ranjit Singh chose to ignore the advice. Despite initial setbacks and being left to his own devices when reinforcements failed to arrive, Diwan Ram Dayal displayed resilience and negotiated a truce with Azim Khan Barakzai.

Mokham Chand was too old to accompany the Sikh forces to Kashmir and died in 1814. Ranjit Singh granted his grandson, Ram Dayal, service in place of his grandfather. Ram Dayal was instrumental in various punitive expeditions against rebellious factions and neighbouring territories, earning a reputation for uncompromising leadership and effectiveness on the battlefield.

In 1818, Diwan Ram Dayal was present at the Battle of Multan. Before this, he had been sent to Multan to collect tribute.

When Akali Sadhu Singh effected a breach at Khizri Gate of the Multan Fort, the Diwan took Sarfraz Khan, one of the two sons of the Nawab Muzaffar Khan who surrendered, on his elephant into the safety of his tent. In 1819, when a second attempt was made by the Sikhs to conquer Kashmir, Diwan Ram Dayal commanded the rear division of the army. Although heavy rains prevented him from active participation in the main campaign, nevertheless the expedition succeeded, consolidating Kashmir as part of Ranjit Singh's expanding domain.

In 1819, Diwan Ram Dayal was appointed the governor of Hazara.

== Death ==
Ram Dayal's final campaign was in Hazara, quelling an uprising of the Yusafzais. Despite a valiant defence, he was tragically killed in action, marking the end of a distinguished military career.

== Legacy ==
Diwan Ram Dayal's legacy is that of a courageous military leader and skilled administrator who contributed significantly to the rise and stability of the Sikh Empire during a tumultuous period of regional conflicts and power struggles. His strategic insights and battlefield exploits remain notable in the annals of Sikh history.

== Memorial ==
Diwan Ram Dayal was succeeded by Sardar Hari Singh Nalwa as the governor of Hazara. In a befitting tribute, the Sardar built a samadhi (memorial) in Hazara to honour the Diwan.
