= Sardar Hukma Singh =

Governor of Attock and Hazara in the Sikh Empire from 1818 to 1820

Sardar Hukma Singh Chimni

Governor of Hazara
- In office 1814–1819
- Monarch: Ranjit Singh
- Preceded by: position established
- Succeeded by: Diwan Ram Dayal

Personal details
- Parent: Ram Singh

Hukma Singh was the first governor of Hazara region in the Sikh Empire from 1814 to 1819, with headquarters at Attock. He was a Rajput of the Chandravanshi line and Bhati clan.

== Early life ==
Hukma Singh was born to Ram Singh, a soldier in the Sukerchakia Misl. Ram Singh was later killed at Bhula Kariala in a skirmish.

== Military career ==
Hukma Singh joined the Khalsa Army when able to bear arms and distinguished himself in the Battle of Kasur in 1807, in which he was severely wounded. He was created a Chief (Sardar) at the same time as Hari Singh Nalwa and received charge of the Ramnagar District and military command of the contingents of the Darap Jagirdars. He fought with the Lahore Chiefs in Pathankot and Sialkot, earning him approval from Maharaja Ranjit Singh. For his contribution in the battle, Hukma Singh received Jagirs worth Rs. 60,000 in Ugoki and Roras, and additional Jagirs worth Rs. 40,000 in Sayadgarh, and also a portion of the Sialkot Jagir, which he held for 7 years.

=== Battle of Attock (1814) ===
With the help of the Khattaks from the Khairabad area, Yar Muhammad Khan, the governor of Peshawar, attacked the fort of Attock in 1816 while Fateh Khan Barakzai crossed the Indus River. But the Sikh leaders who were nearby, Hukma Singh Chimni and Sham Singh Attariwala, were able to defeat Yar Muhammad Khan's army and forced them to retreat to the western Indus.

Maharaja Ranjit Singh discovered in May 1816 that Wazir Fatah Khan had reached Kashmir through the Hazara highlands' Pakhli and Dhamtaur passes. Ranjit Singh responded by designating Dal Singh and Ram Dayal to keep watch at Attock and keep track of Fatah Khan's movements. The consequence was the permanent incorporation of Attock fort into the Sikh Empire.

=== Governor of Hazara ===
Hukma Singh Chimni was the first Governor of Hazara, holding the post from 1814 to 1819, and initially making his headquarters at Attock. From there, he began the gradual occupation of the Hazara region. In order to administer the territory of Hazara, Hukma Singh appointed his own officers. The Hazara territory lying to the northeast of Hassan Abdal was assigned to Lahna Singh Sandhanwalia, who pursued a policy of peace. The tract of Khattak, lying on the right bank of the River Indus, was given in charge to Mahu Singh. The country of Akora Khattak, lying on the west of the Indus and on the north of the tract of Khattak immediately bordering upon the river, was granted to Budh Singh Sandhanwalia who deputed Piara Mai as his assistant.

Hukma Singh was noted for his strict and often harsh rule. He had a leading Yusafzai chief, Sayyid Khan, executed publicly in 1819, and this act had led to a wide-scale uprising in Hazara. Hazara then revolted against Sikh rule under Sher Zaman Khan. Seeing the rebellion grow, Maharaja Ranjit Singh decided to relieve Hukma Singh of his duties.
