= Kirpa Ram (Sikh official) =

Sikh soldier and administrator (died 1842)

Diwan Kirpa Ram

Sikh governor of Kashmir
- In office 1827–1831
- Monarch: Ranjit Singh
- Preceded by: Chuni Lal
- Succeeded by: Bham Singh Ardali

Personal details
- Died: 1842 Benares
- Children: Dhanraj (adopted, d. 1889)

Military service
- Battles/wars: Afghan–Sikh Wars; Battle of Nowshera

Diwan Kirpa Ram (died 1842) was a civil administrator in the Sikh Empire who served as the Sikh governor of Kashmir from 1827 to 1831.

== Family ==
Diwan Kirpa Ram was born into a family with a legacy of military and administrative service. His grandfather Mohkam Chand had contributed significantly to the early consolidation of territories that came under the sway of Ranjit Singh. His father Moti Ram was also an able administrator who served as the governor of Kashmir for two terms. Kirpa Ram's brother, Ram Dayal, was killed by rebellious tribes in Hazara during his tenure of governorship.

== Career ==
Kirpa Ram managed the Jalandhar doab while his father Diwan Moti Ram was serving in Kashmir. In 1823, Diwan Kirpa Ram participated in the battle of Nowshera against the Barakzai Afghans in the trans-Indus region on the banks of the Kabul River. He was with the advance troops and played a crucial role alongside Hari Singh Nalwa in securing Sikh dominance against Afghan forces.

In 1827, Diwan Kirpa Ram was appointed the Governor of Kashmir, a post he held till 1831. Despite his success, and like his father before him, Kirpa Ram faced political challenges and intrigues within the maharaja's court, particularly from rivals like Dhian Singh and Gulab Singh, who had long been eyeing Kashmir. Accusations of embezzlement led to Kirpa Ram's imprisonment.

== Departure ==
Repeated insults, slights, imprisonment and the imposition of an unjustified exorbitant fine forced Kirpa Ram to apply for permission to join his father in Benares. While Moti Ram obtained permission from Ranjit Singh before he left the Sikh Empire for Benares in May 1833, Kirpa Ram applied but got no answer. Tired of waiting, Diwan Kirpa Ram undertook a pilgrimage to Jwalamukhi and crossed the Satluj into British territory. En route, he was offered a job by the Phulkian rajas whose state he travelled through, but he refused them.

After Kirpa Ram's departure, Ranjit Singh applauded the capability and intelligence of Dewan Mokham Chand, Moti Ram, Ram Dayal and Kirpa Ram in the Durbar. He attempted to facilitate Moti Ram's return without success. After Ranjit Singh's demise, his inheritors tried to tempt Diwan Kirpa Ram with money and position but failed.
