= Battle of Shopian =

Battle of 1819 between a force of the Sikh Empire and Jabbar Khan

Battle of Shopian (Note: The battle is also referred to as the Battle of Supin, Supine, Shupiyan, Supiya, and Soopyn.)
- Part of the Afghan–Sikh Wars
Date	3 July 1819 (Note: The date of the battle is disputed. It has also been given as 5 July 1819.)
Location	Shopian, Kashmir 33.72°N 74.83°E
Result	Sikh victory; Kashmir Valley annexed into the Sikh Empire

Belligerents
Sikh Empire	Afghan Empire

Commanders and leaders
Ranjit Singh; Misr Chand; Hari Nakwa; Khushal Jamadar; Kharak Singh; Akali Singh; Sham Singh; Jawala Singh; Hukam Chmni	Jabbar Khan Barakzai (WIA); Aghar Khan

Strength
30,000 (Note: The entire expedition had 30,000 troops, however most were not present on the battlefield. Kharak Singh's 8,000 troops were stationed in the area around Surdee Thana and Ranjit Singh's 10,000 troops were stationed at Bhimber and along the route to Surdee Thana. An unknown number of troops were also garrisoned throughout the forts captured in the Pir Panjal Range on the route from Surdee Thana to Shopian)	Unknown
- Location within India

The Battle of Shopian took place on 3 July 1819 between an expeditionary force from the Sikh Empire and Jabbar Khan, the governor of the Kashmir Valley province of the Durrani Empire. It was the decisive battle during the Sikh expedition into Kashmir in 1819.

== Background ==
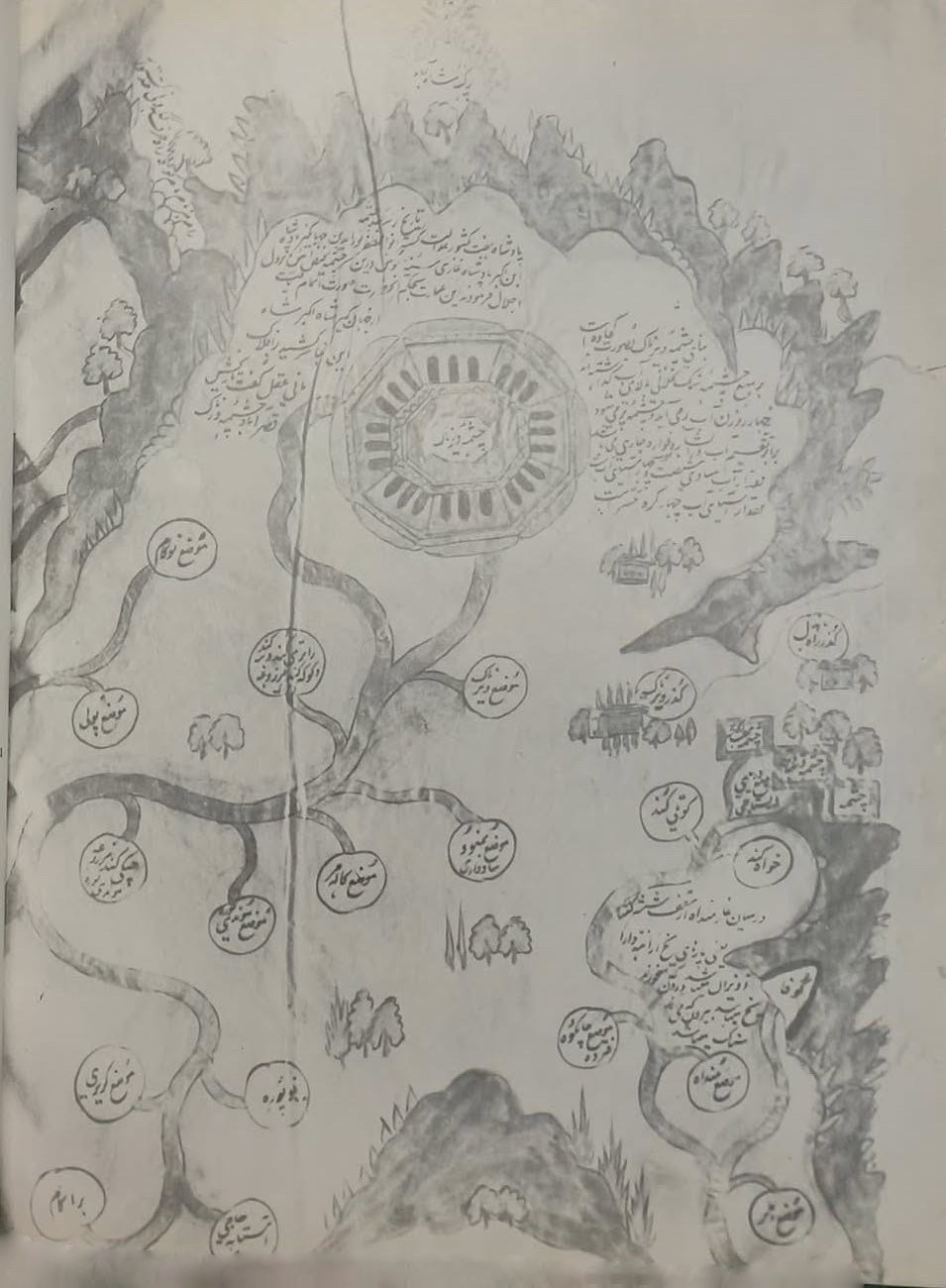
Sikh map of Kashmir created shortly before their campaign in the region in 1819

Ranjit Singh had made up his mind to conquer Kashmir Valley since as early as his victory in the battle of Haidru in 1813, in which Attock Fort came under his control. The first Sikh expedition into the valley in 1814 resulted in a failure, although Ranjit Singh managed to subdue Muslim hill chiefs of Bhimber, Rajouri, Poonch, Nurpur, and others along the Pir Panjal Range. However the Durrani Empire kept de facto control of the areas because the Pir Panjal Range blocked supplies and fresh troops to the Sikh armies.

After the death of Fateh Khan Wazir in 1818, governor Azim Khan left Kashmir for Kabul to assume Wazir's office, leaving Jabbar Khan in charge of Kashmir. Birbal Dhar, Azim Khan's revenue minister, betrayed his master and traveled to Lahore, the capital of the Sikh Empire, asking Ranjit Singh to annex Kashmir, saying the Afghan rule was very unpopular among the people of Kashmir.

== 1819 Kashmir expedition ==
The Sikh expeditionary force established two armories for the expedition at Gujrat and Wazirabad. On 20 April, Ranjit Singh ordered his men from Lahore to the hill states at the foot of the Pir Panjal range. The expedition was split into three columns: Misr Diwan Chand commanded the advance force of about 12,000 with heavy artillery where Kharak Singh and Hari Singh Nalwa marched behind him, and Ranjit Singh commanded the rear guard, protecting the supply train. The expeditionary force marched to Bhimber and resupplied, capturing the fort of a local Hakim without resistance. On 1 May, both columns of the Sikh Army reached Rajouri where its ruler, Raja Aghar Khan, rebelled and forced a battle. Hari Singh Nalwa took command of a force and routed his army, which offered an unconditional surrender after losing most of its men and war supplies. Aghar Khan's brother, Raja Rahimullah Khan, was appointed the Raja of Rajauri in return for assistance in navigating the 'Behram Pass' (Baramgala, 33.605°N 74.4136°E, the lower end of the Pir Panjal Pass).

Once the Sikh forces reached the Behram Pass, the Durrani-appointed faujdar charged with guarding it fled to Srinagar. Mir Mohammad Khan, the kotwal of Poonch, and Mohammad Ali, the kotwal of Shopian, attempted a defense at the Dhaki Deo and Maja passes but were defeated and surrendered to Misr Diwan Chand on 23 June 1819. Kharak Singh now advanced to Surdee Thana, (Note: Surdee Thana is possibly modern-day Thanamandi. Travel guides from later eras note a route through the Pir Panjal Range from Rajauri to a town named "Thanna" and from "Thanna" to Shopian) while Misr Diwan Chand split his force into three divisions and ordered them to cross the Pir Panjal Range through different passes.

== Battle ==
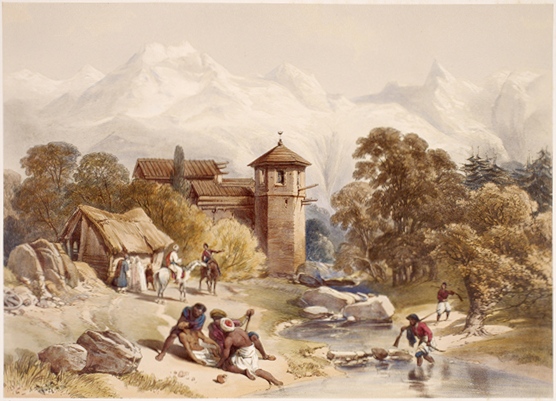
The Fort of Shupayan, from where Ranjit Singh controlled the region, as sketched by Charles Hardinge

The army regrouped at Surai Ali (Note: Also referred to as Serai Illahi and Serai Ali) on the road to Shopian. On 3 July 1819, the Sikh army attempted to march through Shopian to Srinagar but was stopped by a Durrani army headed by Jabbar Khan. The Durrani force had heavily entrenched itself in preparation for the Sikh artillery attack and brought heavy artillery, which the Sikhs were unprepared for because they had brought only light guns.

Once his artillery was in range, Misr Diwan Chand opened the battle with an artillery barrage and multiple infantry and cavalry charges. The Durrani army was able to hold back the Sikh attempts to storm their lines until the Sikhs began moving their guns forward. However, while Misr Diwan Chand was overseeing the movement of guns on the Sikh left flank, Jabbar Khan saw an opening and led the Durrani right flank which stormed Misr Diwan Chand's artillery battery, captured two guns, and threw the Sikh left flank in "disarray". However the Durrani force attacking the Sikh left flank was exposed from their left and Akali Phoola Singh, the commander of the Sikh right flank, rallied his troops and led his command in a charge across the battlefield to the artillery battery. After a close quarters fight which resulted in both sides resorting to using swords and daggers, the Durrani soldiers proved to be ineffective against the much superior martial skills of the Sikh soldiers and sections of the Durrani force began to retreat and Jabbar Khan was wounded while escaping the battlefield. On 15 July 1819, the Sikh army made their way into Srinagar.

== Aftermath ==
Jabbar Khan and his army fled from the battlefield to Muzaffarbad but were turned away by the governor, then fleeing to Peshawar and finally to Kabul. When the Sikh army entered the city of Srinagar after the battle, Prince Kharak Singh guaranteed the personal safety of every citizen and ensured the city was not plundered. The peaceful capture of Srinagar was important as Srinagar, besides having a large Shawl-making industry, was also the center of trade between Panjab, Tibet, Iskardo, and Ladakh.

After taking Srinagar, the Sikh army faced no major opposition in conquering Kashmir. However, when Ranjit Singh installed Moti Ram, the son of Dewan Mokham Chand, as the new governor of Kashmir, he also sent a "large body of troops" with him to ensure tribute from strongholds within Kashmir that might attempt to resist Sikh rule. The capture of Kashmir set the boundaries and borders of the Sikh Empire with Tibet. The conquest of Kashmir marked an "extensive addition" to the Sikh Empire and "significantly" increased the empire's revenue and landmass.

== Bibliography ==
- Chopra, Gulshan Lall (1928), The Panjab as a Sovereign State, Lahore: Uttar Chand Kapur and Sons
- Johar, Surinder Singh (1985), The Secular Maharaja: A Biography of Maharaja Ranjit Singh, Manas, ISBN 9780836415438
- Johar, Surinder Singh (December 2000), "Annexation of Kashmir to the Sikh Kingdom", The Sikh Review, The Sikh Cultural Center, Calcutta
- Nalwa, Vanit (2009), Hari Singh Nalwa - Champion of the Khalsaji, New Delhi: Manohar Books, ISBN 978-81-7304-785-5
- Akali Baba Phool Singh Ji (PDF), Jalandhar: Sikh Missionary College
- Prinsep, Henry Thoby; Prinsep, James (1846), History of the Punjab: And of the Rise, Progress, and Present Condition of the Sect and Nation of the Sikhs (Volume II), Wm. H. Allen and Co., ISBN 978-1-142-34278-4
- Gupta, Hari Ram (1991). The History of the Sikhs Volume 5. Munshiram Manoharlal. ISBN 9788121505154.
- Murray, John (1883), Handbook of the Punjab, western Rajputana, Kashmir, and upper Sindh, J. Murray
- Drew, Frederic (1875), The Jummoo and Kashmir territories: A geographical account, E. Stanford
