= Mohkam Chand =

Official of the Sikh Empire

Diwan Mohkam Chand
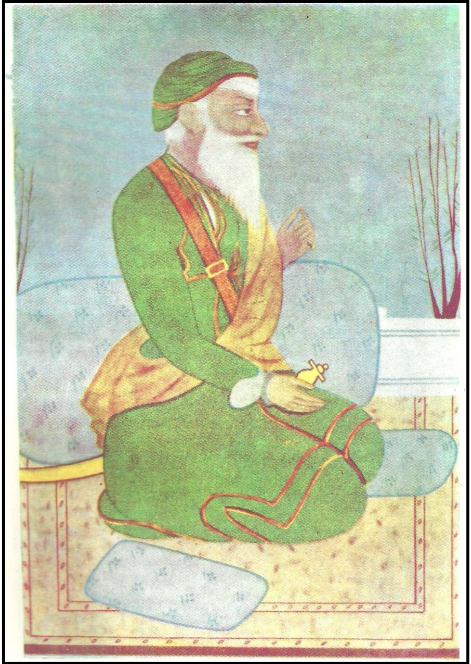
- Born: 1750; Kunjah, Gujrat, Subah of Lahore, Mughal Empire
- Died: 16 or 19 October 1814; Phillaur, Sikh Empire
- Children: Diwan Moti Ram
- Relatives: Grandsons: Diwan Ram Dayal, Diwan Kirpa Ram
- Military career
- Rank: Military officer

Mohkam Chand (died 16 or 29 October 1814) was one of the principal commanders of the Sikh Empire. He conquered Attock from the Durrani Afghans in 1813 and subdued the Rajputs in the hills of Himachal and in Jammu at Jasrota, Chamba, and Basohli. He also commanded one of the early Sikh expeditions to conquer Kashmir that ended in failure due to bad weather blocking the passes to the valley.

== Early life ==
Diwan Mohkam Chand was born in a Punjabi Hindu Khatri family of a Kochhar background, to Vaisakhi Mal, (Note: Alternatively spelt as 'Baisakhi Mal'.) a tradesman from the village of Kunjah near Gujrat.

Before taking up work under Ranjit Singh, he had worked under Dal Singh Gill of Akalgarh as a munshi (accountant) until 1804 when Dal Singh died. After Dal Singh Gill's passing, his widow Sehju did not get along with Mohkam Chand and therefore the latter sought employment elsewhere.

His next stint was with Sahib Singh Bhangi of the Bhangi Misl between 1804 and 1806, where he was appointed to the position of diwan. He eventually fell out of favour and was even imprisoned awaiting execution, but the wife of Sahib Singh, Chand Kaur, spared his life by assisting his escape.

He would find work under Maharaja Ranjit Singh in 1806 after his escape from the Bhangi Misl.

== Military career ==
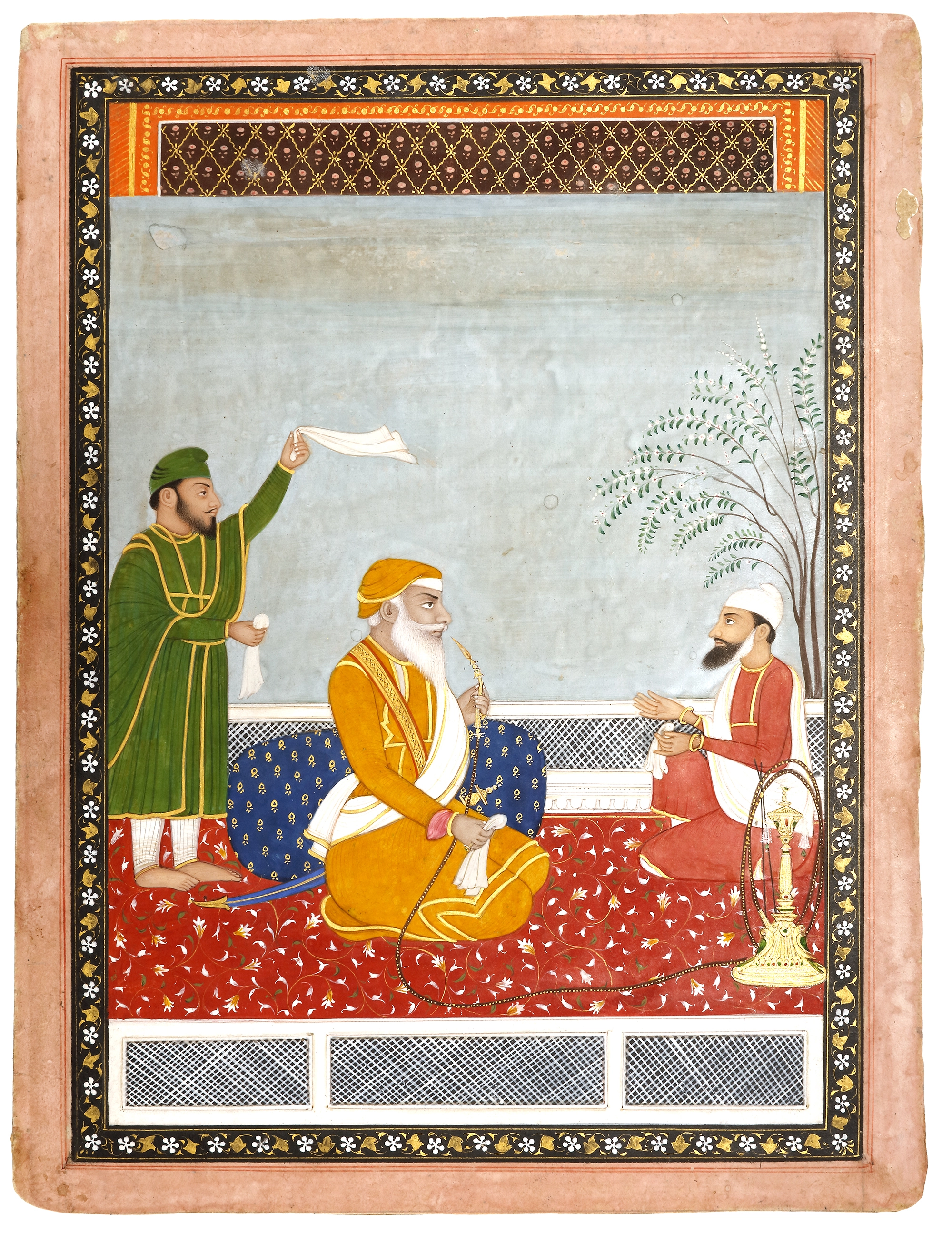
A portrait of Diwan Mokham Chand on a terrace, circa 1840

Mohkam Chand was one of the most distinguished general of Ranjit Singh. He helped with many conquests between the years 1806–1814.

Ranjit Singh had seen him in action at Akalgarh three years earlier and again in the fight against the Bhangi Sardar of Gujrat. Mohkam Chand had fallen out with the Bhangi and came to Ranjit Singh upon his request. Ranjit welcomed him with handsome gifts of an elephant and horses and granted him the Dallewalia possessions as a Jagir. He was made commander of a cavalry unit with the power to recruit 1500 foot soldiers as well.

In the beginning of 1808 various places in the Upper Punjab were taken from their independent Sikh proprietors, and brought under the direct management of the new kingdom of Lahore, and Mohkam Chand was at the same time employed in effecting a settlement of the territories which had been seized on the left bank of the Sutlej. But Ranjit Singh’s systematic aggression had begun to excite fear in the minds of the Sikhs of Sirhind

In September 1808, he was responsible for receiving the British East India Company envoy Charles Metcalf at Kasur alongside Fateh Singh Ahluwalia, for the former's visit to Lahore. Remarks about the martial prowess of the British and Sikhs were exchanged between the two.

Historians report an interesting conversation between Charles Metcalf and Mohkam Chand: the latter commented the British had not seen Sikh bravery on the battlefield, to which Metcalf readily responded the Sikh had not yet seen British courage.

— Robina Yasmin, Muslims Under Sikh Rule in the Nineteenth Century: Maharaja Ranjit Singh and Religious Tolerance, page 93

In the year 1812, he was awarded with the titles of diwan and fateh nasib.

He was the commander in chief of Sikh army during the battle of Attock in which he defeated Durrani general Wazir Fateh Khan and Dost Mohammad Khan. With the permission of the maharaja, the Sikh forces attacked the Afghans on 12 July 1813 at Hazro, about 8 kilometers from Attock. Large-scale fighting took place between the adversaries. In the meantime, the Afghans received fresh reinforcements under Dost Muhammad Khan. The Diwan left his elephant, mounted a horse and personally leading his reserves fell upon the disorganized Afghans. The Sikhs plundered the provisions of the Afghans. Besides Diwan Mohkam Chand, Jodh Singh Kalsia, Fateh Singh Ahluwalia, and Sardar Dal Singh, and Diwan Ram Dayal (1799–1820) also took part in fighting against Afghans at Hazro. Fateh Khan fled to Peshawar. Thus the victory for the Sikhs was complete. Hukam Singh Chimni was appointed qiladar of the fort of Attock.

== Death and successors ==
Diwan Mohkam Chand died at Phillaur on 29 October 1814. His son, Diwan Moti Ram, and grandson, Diwan Kirpa Ram, served as governors of Kashmir. Diwan Ram Dayal, known for his 'vigilance and smartness in the art of soldiery', succeeded his grandfather as the commander of the State Troops. He was killed in Hazara in 1820 while quelling an insurrection. His compatriot, Hari Singh Nalwa, built a memorial to honour him in Haripur.

Diwan Mohkam Chand was one of the architects of the Sikh Empire who rose by dint of merit to the post of Diwan and virtually the commander-in-chief of the Sikh forces. N. K. Sinha observes. "As a general, he was uniformly successful and from 1806 to 1814 the annexations of Ranjit were due not only to his own irresistible cunning but also to Mohkam Chand's military talents." Ranjit Singh always held him in high esteem. He had a sound knowledge of military tactics and strategy. He did not suffer a defeat; he was an ever victorious General.

Moti Ram and Kirpa Ram rendered commendable service at the Court of Lahore over decades, yet both father and son were hounded and forced to leave for Benaras due to the undue influence of Dhian Singh, who succeeded in eliminating this "great and influential" family at the Court of Lahore.

== See also ==
- List of historical Sikh generals
