= Siege of Multan (1818) =

1818 battle in the Afghan–Sikh wars

- Part of the Afghan-Sikh wars
| Date | January/February – June 1818 |
| Location | Multan, Multan province 30.198247°N 71.470311°E |
| Result | Sikh victory |
| Territorial changes | Multan annexed by the Sikh Empire: Khangarh, Muzaffargarh and Shujabad occupied |

Belligerents
| Sikh Empire | Sadozai rulers of Multan |

Commanders and leaders
| Ranjit Singh; Kharak Singh; Misr Diwan Chand; Ilahi Bakhsh; Akali Phula Singh; Fateh Singh Ahluwalia; Hari Singh Nalwa; Diwan Moti Ram; Diwan Ram Dayal; Sadhu Singh Akali; Dhanna Singh Malwai; Dal Singh Naherna; Jodh Singh Kalsia | Muzaffar Khan Sadozai †; Shah Nawaz Khan †; Haq Nawaz Khan †; Mumtaz Khan †; Azam Khan †; Shah Baz Khan †; Sarfraz Khan (POW); Zulfiqar Khan (WIA); Amir Beg Khan (WIA) |

Strength
| 15,000–25,000 horse and foot with artillery 12 cannons 500 beldars | 2,000–3,000 Garrison; About 20,000-40,000 levies 20 cannons |

Casualties and losses
| About 10,000 total Sikh killed | About 12,000 Muslims killed |
- Thousands of civilians massacred
- Location of Multan within present-day Pakistan

The Siege of Multan was the final Sikh campaign against Multan in 1818, resulting in the defeat of Muzaffar Khan Sadozai and the annexation of Multan by Ranjit Singh. The campaign followed earlier expeditions and tribute settlements between Ranjit Singh and the Sadozai ruler of Multan from 1802 onward.

The Sikh army was led nominally by Prince Kharak Singh, while the command in the field was held by Misr Diwan Chand. The Sikh forces first occupied Khangarh and Muzaffargarh, then took the city of Multan and besieged the fort. The fort resisted for several months, with repeated assaults, mining, bombardment and negotiations failing to produce a surrender.

The final breach was carried by Sikh assault troops led by Sadhu Singh Akali, followed by a general attack on the fort. Muzaffar Khan was killed with several of his sons, while surviving members of his family were taken to Lahore and granted maintenance. The city and fort were then plundered. The capture of Multan ended Sadozai control there, extended Sikh authority toward the lower Indus, and added a revenue-rich province to Ranjit Singh's empire.

== Background ==
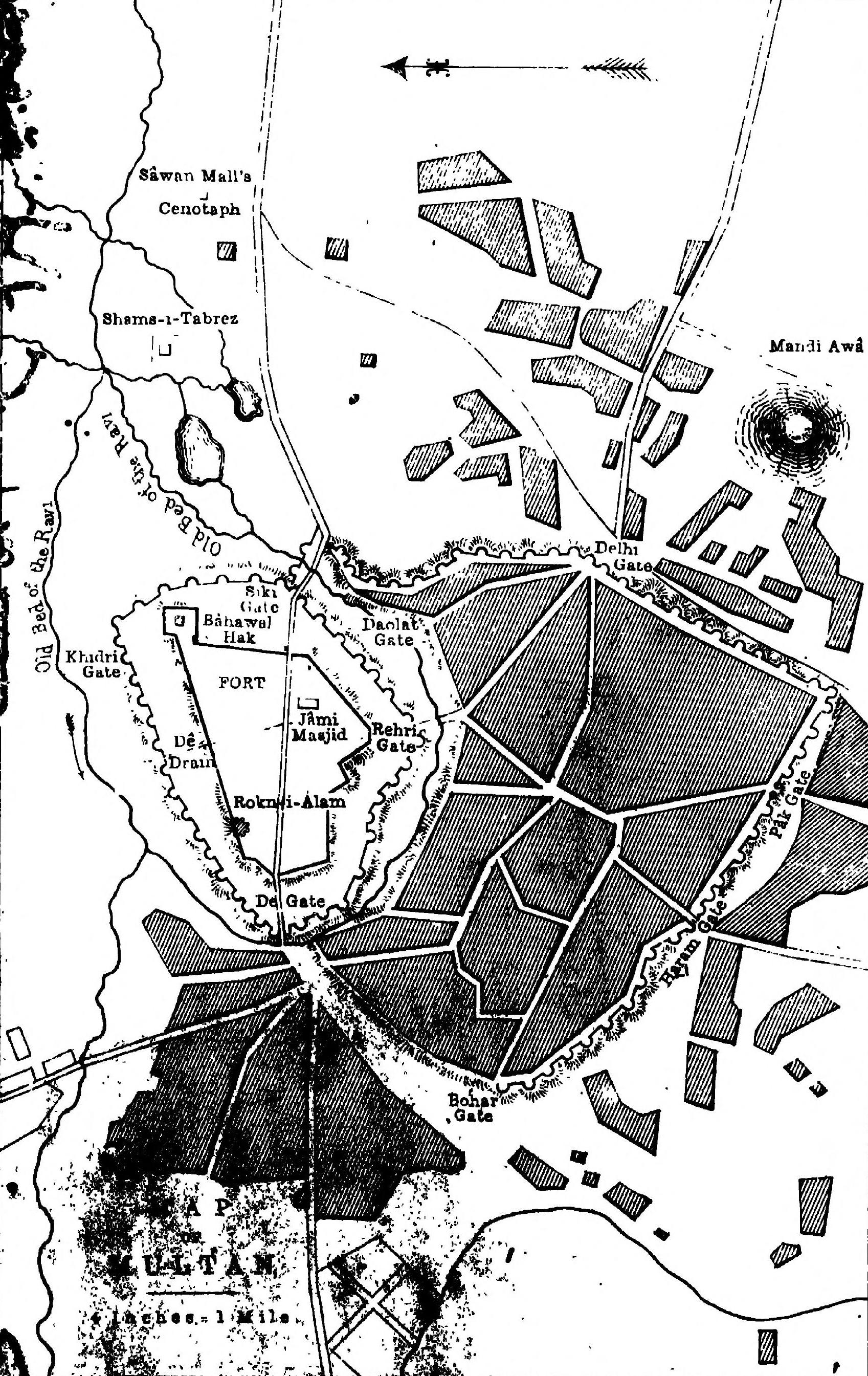
A map of Multan from 1873 showing the Multan Fort

Multan province was about 175 km long and 120 km wide at its broadest point. It was watered by the Indus, Chenab, Ravi and Sutlej, and included Multan, Leiah, Khangarh, Dera Ghazi Khan and Jhang. Its gross income was given as about one and a half crores in one account, while later revenue figures gave 6,80,975 or about 7,00,000 rupees annually.

The town stood east of the Chenab on a ridge and was surrounded by a wall about 5 km in circumference. The city wall was about 16 metres high on the outside, varied between about 3.5 and 6.5 metres on the inside, and had numerous towers and six gates. The fort stood on another mound inside the city wall. It had six unequal sides, walls 13 metres high on the outside, 46 towers, and four gates named Delhi Gate, Khizri Gate, Sikki Gate and Rohri Gate.

Multan had been part of the Mughal Empire before it came under Afghan authority. Ahmad Shah Durrani took the province from the Mughal Empire in 1752 and entrusted it to Shuja Khan, a Sadozai. Bhangi Sikh chiefs held Multan from 1772 until Timur Shah Durrani recovered it in 1779 and placed Muzaffar Khan Sadozai in charge. Muzaffar Khan continued to acknowledge Afghan suzerainty for a time, but after the fall of Shah Shuja-ul-Mulk he became independent in practice.

Multan was important for trade and military communication. It lay on routes linking Punjab with Sind, Afghanistan, Central Asia and Delhi, and the Bolan route was connected with its strategic value. The province also stood between Bahawalpur and Sind, giving its holder a position between neighbouring Muslim states south of the Sikh territories.

== Earlier expeditions ==
Ranjit Singh made repeated attempts to impose tribute on Multan before the final conquest. His first expedition took place in the winter of 1802. Muzaffar Khan met him outside Multan, offered presents, and promised tribute.

A second advance followed in 1805, after the Dussehra celebrations. Ranjit Singh reached Jhang, received tribute from the Baluch chief of Sahiwal, and advanced toward Multan. Muzaffar Khan offered presents and 70,000 rupees in cash, after which Ranjit Singh returned and news of Holkar and Lake entering Punjab caused him to hurry back to Lahore.

In 1807 Ranjit Singh again advanced toward Multan. Ahmad Khan Sial of Jhang and Qutb-ud-Din of Kasur had encouraged Muzaffar Khan to resist, and Dipalpur was seized during the advance. The city was besieged, but peace was arranged through Fatah Singh Kalianwala and the Nawab of Bahawalpur. Muzaffar Khan gave indemnity as 70,000 rupees and five horses as nazar, and the siege was lifted.

Shah Shuja-ul-Mulk entered the politics of Multan after losing the Afghan throne in 1809. Ranjit Singh met him at Khushab in early 1810 and offered to conquer Multan for him, but Shah Shuja distrusted the proposal. Shah Shuja later came to Multan with a Sikh detachment of about 1,000 men and asked to reside in the fort with his family while preparing to recover his throne and Muzaffar Khan refused the request.

The 1810 campaign was the most serious pre-1818 attempt. Ranjit Singh reached Multan in February 1810 after settling affairs at Uch. Muzaffar Khan refused a demand for three lakhs of rupees, and the city was taken on 25 February before the fort was besieged. Sikh forces placed batteries, made supply arrangements from Lahore and Amritsar, and attempted direct assault and mining. The defenders countermined, blew up a Sikh battery, and caused many casualties. The siege lasted about two months and ended with Muzaffar Khan paying tribute and horses.

Tribute expeditions continued after 1810. In 1812 Dal Singh was sent to collect the annual tribute and the amount was settled at 70,000 rupees in instalments. In 1815 or 1816, Akali Phula Singh and Bhawani Das were sent against Multan, and Muzaffar Khan paid 80,000 rupees in one account and two lakhs in another. In 1817, Bhawani Das and Ram Dayal were sent again, and the force retreated after receiving 61,000 rupees. Upon his return, Bhawani Das was punished for accepting a bribe to withdraw..

By 1817 Muzaffar Khan had become unwilling to continue paying irregular and repeated tribute demands. He repaired the fort, mounted guns, collected provisions for six months and kept about 3,000 men in the fort. Reports also reached Lahore that exactions had begun in the city and that the inhabitants were under hardship.

== Preparations for the final campaign ==
The final campaign was prepared on a larger scale. Ranjit Singh chose a time when the Kabul government was disorganized and Wazir Fateh Khan was occupied at Herat, leaving Muzaffar Khan without effective outside assistance. By the end of 1817, the smaller states and chiefs around Multan had been weakened or detached from Afghan allegiance, leaving Multan itself as the remaining target.

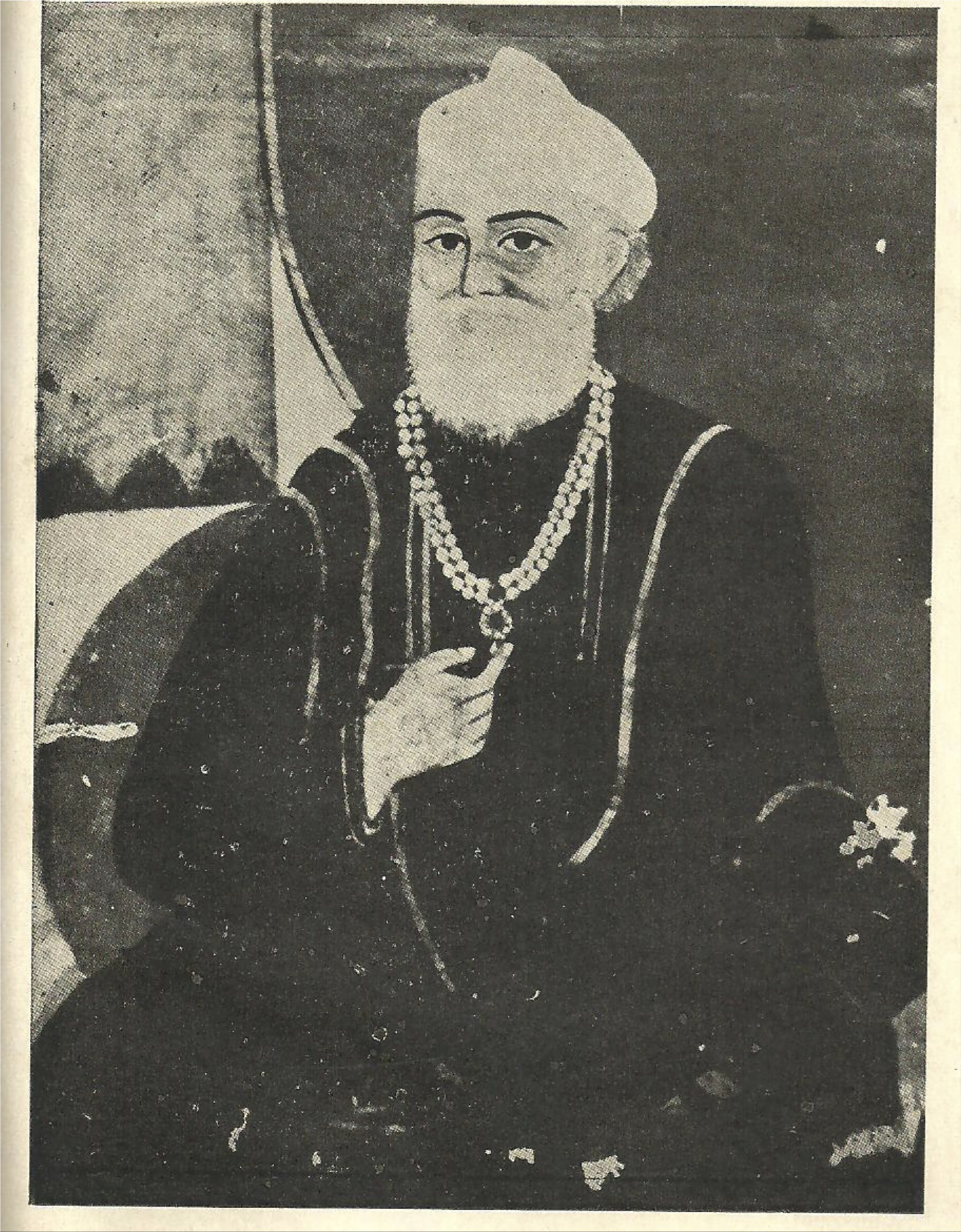
Painting of Misr Diwan Chand, c. 1799–1849

Misr Diwan Chand had risen through the ordnance and accounts establishment before receiving high command. He was the son of a Brahman shopkeeper of Gondlanwala in Sialkot district and had worked as a grain weigher before entering Ranjit Singh's service in the accounts branch of the ordnance department in 1812. After Ghaus Khan died in 1814, Diwan Chand was given charge of the ordnance department along with the accounts. In January 1818, Ranjit Singh appointed him commander-in-chief of the army sent against Multan.

The expedition was placed under the nominal leadership of the sixteen-year-old Prince Kharak Singh, while the actual command remained with Diwan Chand. The army is given as either 20,000 or 25,000 horse and foot, with a large artillery train and 12 batteries. Its commanders included Dal Singh Naherna, Fateh Singh Ahluwalia, Dhanna Singh Malwai, Diwan Moti Ram, Diwan Ram Dayal, Jodh Singh Kalsia and Hari Singh Nalwa. Ilahi Bakhsh commanded the artillery, and Akali contingents also accompanied the army.

Logistical arrangements were made before the march. Boats on the Ravi, Chenab and Jhelum were requisitioned to move supplies and stores, ferries were guarded, bullocks were collected for artillery transport, and postal stations were established between Lahore and Multan. Raj Kaur, the mother of Kharak Singh, camped at Kot Kamalia to supervise supplies.

Muzaffar Khan prepared for resistance. He fortified the city and its defenses, gathered weapons, supplies and ammunition, and rallied nearby Muslim communities with a call for jihad, raising as many as 20,000 levies. His plan was to defend first the countryside, then the city, and finally the fort.

== Siege ==
=== Advance and capture of the city ===
The Sikh army marched from Lahore in January 1818. Khangarh and Muzaffargarh were captured before the army reached Multan. Muzaffar Khan again offered tribute if the Sikh army returned, but the offer was rejected because the object of the campaign was occupation rather than another tribute settlement.

The first stage of fighting took place in the countryside. Muzaffar Khan's irregular forces fought outside the city, but the engagement lasted only one day before the defenders withdrew behind the city walls. The Sikh army then surrounded the city and bombarded its walls. The city fell in February 1818, and the remaining defenders retired into the fort.

=== Investment of the fort ===
After the city was taken, the fort became the main point of resistance. The fort was protected by a broad moat, though the moat was dry at the time of the March operations. The Sikh commanders sought to take the fort before the monsoon could fill the moat with water.

Twelve batteries were installed around the fort and trenches were dug. Diwan Chand requested more labourers, and 500 beldars were sent from Lahore in March. The garrison had large stores of food and water and made repeated sorties against the besiegers. During assaults the defenders threw down stones, bricks, burning charcoal and boiling oil from the fort walls.

The bombardment initially failed to bring down the walls. In one assault the Sikh army lost 1,800 men. Mining and countermining also took place. The defenders blocked or filled breaches with earth and sand, and at times rebuilt defensive mounds behind damaged gates and wall sections.

=== Arrival of the Zamzama Gun ===
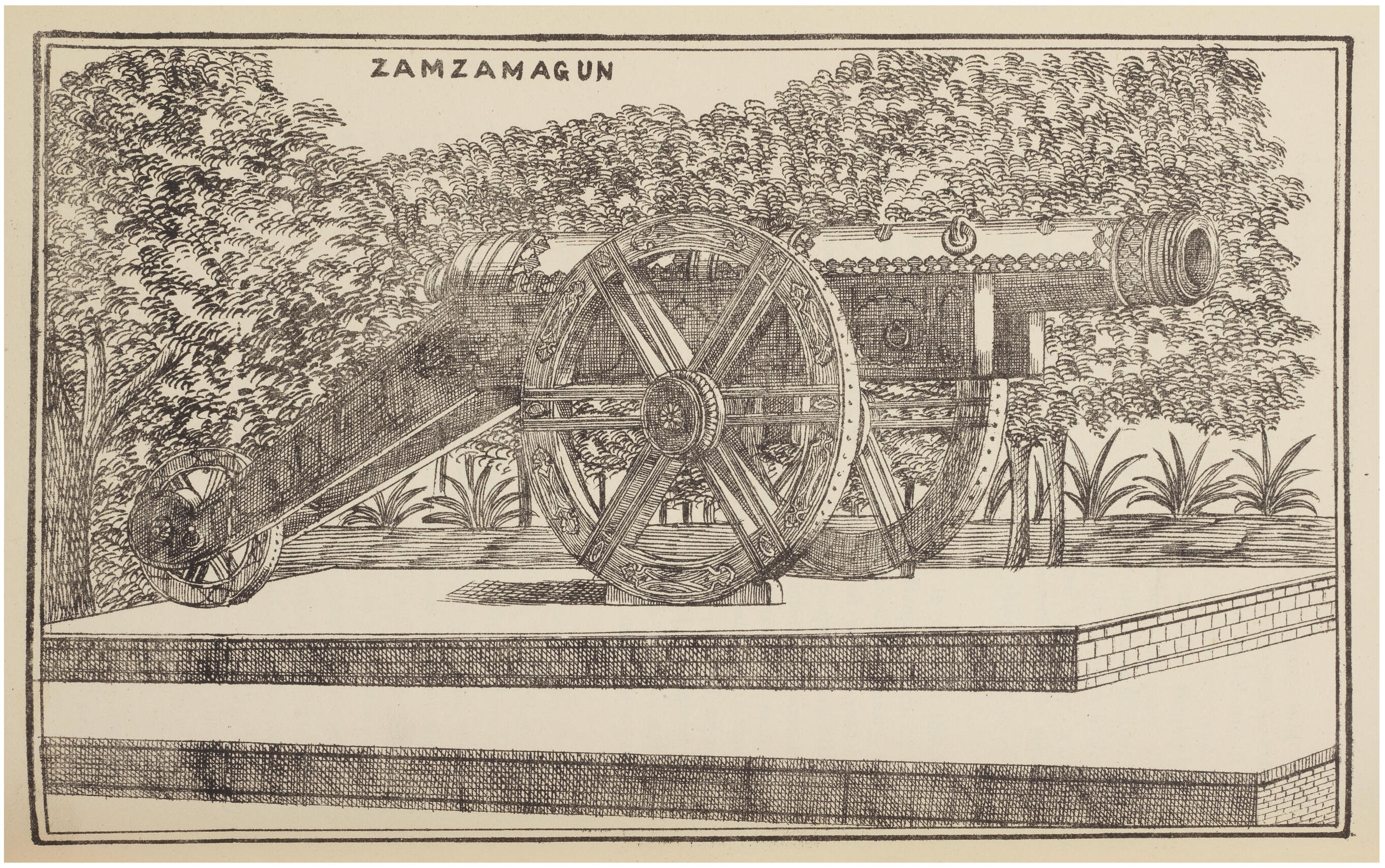
Lithograph illustration of the Zamzama Gun in Lahore

Ranjit Singh instructed Diwan Chand to offer terms before a final assault. Bhawani Das and Chaudhri Qadir Bakhsh were sent to negotiate, offering Muzaffar Khan Shujabad and Khangarh in jagir and safe conduct. Muzaffar Khan was prepared to consider surrender, but his officers opposed the agreement and he decided to continue resistance. A ten-day period passed without surrender.

The Zamzama gun was brought from Amritsar or Lahore to Multan in twelve days. It fired a ball of about 40 kilograms or 80 pounds. The gun was fired four times and made two breaches near the Khizri Gate. Dogra Rajputs from Jammu and the Ramgarhia contingent were among the first storming parties to attack through the breaches, but they were repulsed.

=== Final assault ===
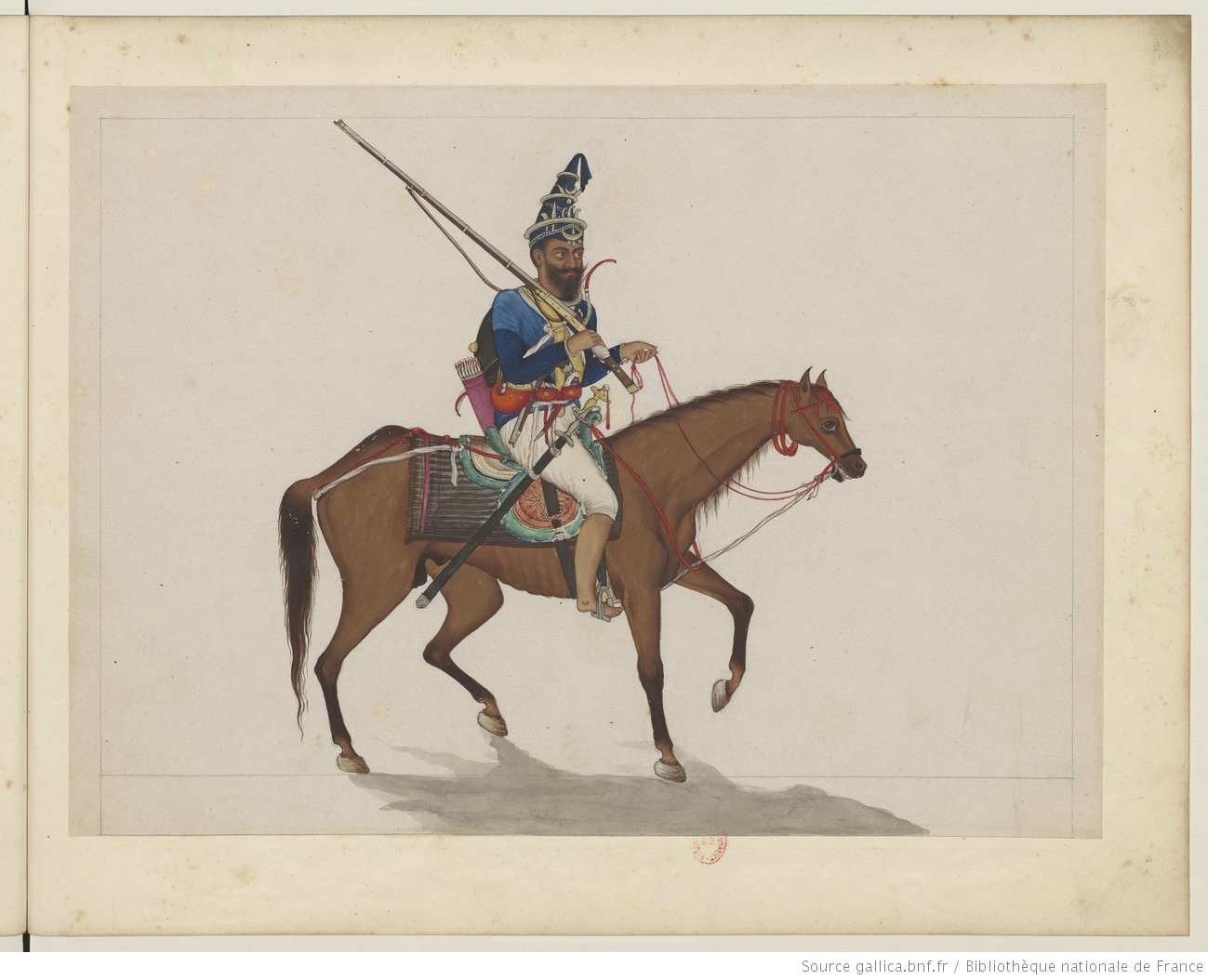
Painting of an Akali-Nihang, c. 19th century

The date of the final assault is given differently by the historians. Bikrama Jit Hasrat, Ganda Singh and Ajmer Singh date the assault to 2 June 1818, while Hari Ram Gupta dates the decisive entry into the fort to 20 June 1818. Sadhu Singh Akali led Nihang troops into one of the breaches, killed the guards there, and entered the fort. The main assaulting parties then followed.

Muzaffar Khan fought in the breach with his family and remaining defenders. He was killed along with several sons. The named dead include Shah Nawaz Khan and Haq Nawaz Khan, and Shah Nawaz Khan, Mumtaz Khan, Azam Khan, Haq Nawaz Khan and Shah Baz Khan. A daughter of Muzaffar Khan is also recorded as having been killed while fighting beside him.

The surviving sons and family members were taken to Lahore. Sarfraz Khan was captured, while Zulfiqar Khan was wounded and survived and Amir Beg Khan is also named among those who survived according to Hari Ram Gupta. Ram Dayal took Sarfraz Khan to his tent with honour after the fighting. Surviving members of Muzaffar Khan's family were given maintenance, including a jagir or pension of 30,000 rupees.

== Sack and occupation ==
The fort and city were plundered after the assault. Houses in the fort were destroyed, houses in the town were burned, valuables belonging to the Nawab were confiscated for the state, and arms were carried off. Civilians suffered robbery and violence during the sack, and thousands were massacred.

The total value of the plunder is given as two million sterling or two crores of rupees in one estimate, and as 20 lakhs in another. Ranjit Singh later ordered that plunder taken at Multan belonged to the state and had to be returned to the treasury and toshakhana within three days. The order threatened defaulters with punishment, and about five lakhs of rupees' worth of property was surrendered by the troops.

News of the fall reached Lahore on 26 Jeth 1875, or 29 June 1818. The messenger was rewarded with gold bangles and a khilat. Lahore and Amritsar were illuminated, Ranjit Singh rode through the bazaars on an elephant distributing silver rupees, and offerings were made at Hindu, Muslim and Sikh shrines.

== Aftermath ==
A detachment under Jodh Singh Kalsia, Dal Singh Naherna and Deva Singh Doabia, along with two Najib battalions, was left at Multan to hold the city and establish order. A strong force was sent to Shujabad, another stronghold of Muzaffar Khan and it fell without resistance, and five cannons were taken there.

The bombardment had damaged the fort walls, bastions and parapets. Repairs and new construction began after occupation. The formal entry into the fort took place on 14 Har 1875. Records gave the expenditure on buildings from 1 Har 1875 to Bhadon 1896 as Rs. 38,284-11-6 over fifteen months.

At a durbar in Lahore, Diwan Chand received the title Khair Khwah, Basafa, Zafar Jang, Fatah Nasib, Misr Diwan Chand Bahadur. He also received a khilat and a jagir. Officers were given khilats, jagirs, jewellery and cash, while orders were issued that the sons and relations of sardars and soldiers killed in the campaign should be compensated with employment.

The conquest ended Muzaffar Khan's rule at Multan and removed Afghan authority from a major position in southern Punjab. It gave Ranjit Singh control of a rich province, a trade centre and a military position on the routes toward Sind and the lower Indus. It also strengthened Sikh authority over the Derajat and Bahawalpur and opened the road toward Sind.

== Bibliography ==
- Chhabra, G. S. (1960). The Advanced Study in History of the Punjab: ... Vol. 2. New Acad. Publishing Company.
- Gupta, Hari Ram (1978). History of the Sikhs: The Sikh Lion of Lahore, Maharaja Ranjit Singh, 1799–1839. History of the Sikhs. Vol. 5 (3rd, illustrated ed.). Munshiram Manoharlal. ISBN 9788121505154.
- Hasrat, Bikrama Jit (1977). Life and Times of Ranjit Singh: A Saga of Benevolent Despotism. V. V. Research Institute Book Agency.
- Husain, Farrukh (2018). Afghanistan in the Age of Empires: The Great Game for South and Central Asia (illustrated ed.). Silk Road Books. ISBN 9781527216334.
- Gilla, Rachapāla Siṅgha (2004). Punjab Kosh. Pañjāba kosha. Vol. 2. Bhāshā Wibhāga, Pañjāba.
- Lee, Jonathan L. (2019-01-15). Afghanistan: A History from 1260 to the Present. Reaktion Books. ISBN 978-1-78914-010-1.
- Samra, Mandeep Kaur (2004). Modern Sikh Historiography: Analysis of Times of Maharaja Ranjit Singh by Baba Prem Singh Hoti. K.K. Publications. ISBN 9788178440255.
- Singh, Ganda (1985). The Panjab Past and Present. Vol. 19. Patiala: Department of Punjab Historical Studies, Punjabi University.
- Singh, Ajmer (1997). Military Campaigns of Maharaja Ranjit Singh and Under His Successors (PDF) (PhD thesis). Panjab University Chandigarh.
