= Moti Ram =

Sikh administrator and general (1770–1837)

Diwan Moti Ram

Sikh governor of Kashmir
- In office 1819–1820
- Monarch: Ranjit Singh
- Preceded by: Azim Khan (as Durrani governor)
- Succeeded by: Hari Singh Nalwa
- In office 1821–1826
- Preceded by: Hari Singh Nalwa
- Succeeded by: Chuni Lal

Personal details
- Born: 1770
- Died: 1837 (aged 66–67) Benares
- Children: Diwan Ram Dayal; Diwan Kirpa Ram

Diwan Moti Ram (1770–1837) was the first Sikh governor of Kashmir, serving from 1819–1820 and again during 1821–1826.

== Family ==
Diwan Moti Ram was a son of Dewan Mokham Chand. His sons Diwan Ram Dayal and Kirpa Ram also served honourably at the Court of Lahore.

== Career ==
Moti Ram served at the Lahore Court as an administrator, a military commander and a diplomat.

'Hari Singhee' coin minted in Subah Kashmir during Moti Ram's second tenure as governor of Kashmir.

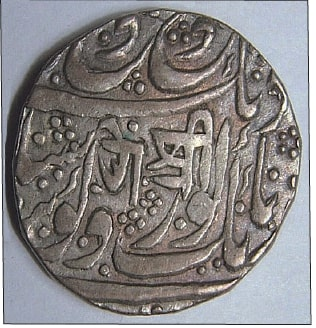
(Obverse) Inscribed ‘Om Sri’ (Devanagri).

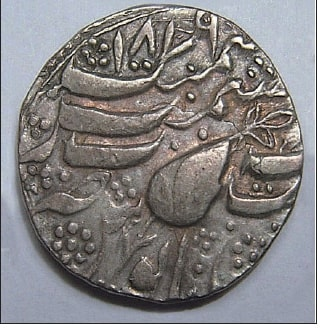
(Reverse) Date of minting in Farsi '1879' VS (1822 CE).

The coin has the Gobindshahi couplet in Farsi on the obverse.

In 1799, following the occupation of Lahore, Maharaja Ranjit Singh deputed Moti Ram to repair the city wall and moat. Before 1814, Moti Ram officiated as the governor of the Jalandhar Doab in place of his father, who was on military expeditions. Following his father's demise in 1814, he was appointed the Governor of the Jalandhar Doab. Moti Ram served as the Governor of Kashmir for two spells— from 1819–1820 and 1821–26. In 1818, Moti Ram participated in the successful Multan campaign.

In 1827, Moti Ram was a member of the Sikh mission sent by Ranjit Singh to felicitate Lord Amherst, the Governor-General of India, when he paid his first visit to Shimla. In 1831, Moti Ram was nominated a member of the delegation sent from Lahore to meet Lord William Bentinck. In October 1831, Diwan Moti Ram was present at the Ropar Meeting between Maharaja Ranjit Singh and Lord William Bentinck held on the bank of the Satluj River.

In December 1831, Maharaja Ranjit Singh granted Kunjah in the Gujrat district of West Punjab and several of its villages as jagir to Moti Ram. The place was Moti Ram's ancestral hometown and worth over three lakh rupees in revenue annually.

== Departure ==
Diwan Moti Ram was hounded out of the Sikh Empire by Dhian Singh Dogra. He left for Benaras, where he died in 1837.
