= Raja Aghar Khan =

19th-century Rajput ruler of Rajouri

- Raja

Raja of Rajouri
- Reign: 1808–1819
- Coronation: 1808
- Predecessor: Raja Karamullah Khan
- Successor: Raja Rahimullah Khan
- Born: Rajouri, Kashmir
- Died: 1825; Lahore, Punjab
- Issue: Raja Hameedullah Khan
Regnal name
- راجہ آغر خان
- Dynasty: Jarral
- Father: Raja Karamullah Khan
- Religion: Islam
- Military career
- Rank: Raja
- Conflicts: Battle of Kashmir (1814); Battle of Toshamaidan Pass; Battle of Shopian

Raja Aghar Khan (also spelled Agar Khan, Agarullah Khan, Aghar Khan, or Agharullah Khan (Note: In the book Gulab Singh 1792–1858 by K. M. Panikkar, Aghar Khan is referred to as Ajar Khan of Rajouri.)) was a military commander and royal from Rajouri. He was a Muslim Rajput prince of Jarral dynasty and the son of Raja Karamullah Khan. Raja Aghar Khan was known for his resistance against Maharaja Ranjit Singh and the Sikh Empire.

== Early life and Ascension ==
Raja Aghar Khan succeeded his father, Raja Karamullah Khan, in 1808 as part of the royal Jarral clan ruling over Rajouri. His succession was initially contested as leading officials and people favored his younger brother, Raja Rahimullah Khan. However, Raja Rahim Khan declined the throne while Raja Aghar Khan was alive, leading to his installation as Raja of Rajouri.

== Career ==
=== Conflict with Ranjit Singh ===
In 1810 and 1812, Maharaja Ranjit Singh attempted to conquer Bhimber, Kotli, and Rajouri. However, Rajouri successfully resisted these invasions.

Raja Aghar Khan secretly obstructed Ranjit Singh's attempts to invade Kashmir between 1812 and 1814, providing covert resistance against the Sikh army. In retaliation, Ranjit Singh launched an attack on Rajouri, plundering the region as punishment for Raja Aghar Khan's defiance.

=== Battle of Kashmir (1814) ===
In 1814, Ranjit Singh launched a major invasion of Kashmir. Aghar Khan initially pretended to support the Sikh forces but secretly misled them, convincing the army to leave their heavy cannons in Rajouri. As the Sikh forces advanced into the hills, they faced fierce resistance from the local chieftains, Including Ruhullah Khan of Poonch. Aghar Khan, in coordination with Ruhullah Khan, spread false rumors of Sikh defeats, causing local tribes to attack the retreating Sikh army and loot their supplies.

The Sikh forces suffered heavy losses, including 2,000 guns and 2,000 swords. Raja Aghar Khan and Ruhullah Khan continued to launch ambushes on Sikh supply lines, significantly weakening Ranjit Singh's ability to capture Kashmir.

=== Betrayal and Fall of Rajouri ===
In 1819, Raja Aghar Khan fought against the Sikhs in the Battle of Shopian alongside Jabbar Khan of the Durrani Empire. Despite his efforts, the Sikh forces emerged victorious, leading to the occupation of Rajouri.

Following this, Raja Aghar Khan's brother, Raja Rahimullah Khan, aligned himself with Maharaja Ranjit Singh. In return for his cooperation, Raja Rahimullah Khan was made the Raja of Rajouri. Aghar Khan fled to Bhimber and led another rebellion against the Sikhs but was later captured and imprisoned in Lahore.

== Death and legacy ==
Raja Aghar Khan died in prison in 1825. He had 4 sons

== Sources ==
=== Citations ===
Works Cited

- Charak, Sukhdev Singh. English Translation Of Gulabnama Of Diwan Kirpa Ram. p. 40.
- Singh, Kanwal (April 2022). "Rise of Gulab Singh from a soldier to Maharaja of Jammu and Kashmir" (PDF). International Journal for Multidisciplinary Research: 3.
- Johar, Surinder Singh (1985). Guru Gobind Singh: A Multidimensional Study. Atlantic Publishers & Distributors. pp. 129–130.
