= Hari Ram Gupta =

Indian historian (1902–1992)

- Born: 5 February 1902; Bhurewal village, Ambala district, Haryana, India
- Died: 28 March 1992 (aged 90); New Delhi, India

Academic background
- Education: University of the Punjab
- Thesis: Evolution of the Sikh Confederacies (1937)

Academic work
- Discipline: Historian
- Institutions: Panjab University

Hari Ram Gupta (5 February 1902 – 28 March 1992) was an Indian historian. The main focus of his work was the Sikh history of 18th century. During 1957 to 1963, he was head of Panjab University's History department. Following his retirement, he was an honorary professor in the History department of University of Delhi from 1964 to 1967.

== Early life and career ==
Gupta was born on 5 February 1902 in Bhurewal village, which is in the present-day's Naraingarh subdistrict of Ambala district, Haryana, India. After completing his higher education at Lahore, he became University of the Punjab's first Doctor of Philosophy (Ph.D.) degree holder and the first Doctor of Letters (D.Litt.) holder in History discipline in 1937 and 1944 respectively. His Ph.D. thesis examiner was Jadunath Sarkar, who states:

Professor Hari Ram Gupta’s thesis on the Evolution of the Sikh Confederaces, which I examined, along with Sir Edward Maclagan, the scholarly ex-governor of the Panjab, for the Ph.D. degree of the Panjab University, struck me as a work of outstanding merit which completely fills up a gap in our knowledge of modern Indian history.... One period of Panjab history and that of Delhi Empire, too, ... has thus been set up on a granite foundation. It ought to sense as a model to other works on Indian history.

Gupta's teaching career began as a History lecturer in Lahore's Forman Christian College, after which he became head of Aitchison College's History department. He also temporarily served as a principal of Vaish College, Bhiwani. After the partition of India, he authored Narratives of Persian and Iraq Force and Burma Campaigns of World War II during his stint with the Ministry of Defence's historical section. Starting with 1957, he was Panjab University's professor and its History department's head till 1963, along with being its dean of instruction for more than one year. Following his retirement, he was an honorary professor in University of Delhi's History department from 1964 to 1967. Later on, he taught at Firozpur's Dev Samaj College for Women. He was the honorary head of the History department for 14 years there, after which he shifted to Delhi.

== Publications and honours ==
According to Khushwant Singh, post-World War I, research work by Indian scholars like Gupta, Ganda Singh, Indubhusan Banerjee, and Sita Ram Kohli "gave a new and national orientation to Sikh history." Before that period, works of Indian Sikh Scholars were limited to Punjabi language, while English works on Sikhism were done by Englishmen.

The main focus of Gupta's work was the Sikh history of 18th century. He planned to give a comprehensive account of multiple aspects of Sikhs via his multi-volume History of the Sikhs. According to Gurmukh Singh, he planned six volumes for that purpose, while according Shiv Kumar Gupta, he intended to author seven volumes in that regard. But he completed four volumes and the fifth one was in print at the point of his death. His decade-long work on the then little-known period of Sikh history from 1708 to 1799 resulted in the Studies in Later Mughal history of the Panjab and three other volumes. First published in 1944, the Studies in the Later Mughal History of the Panjab (1707–1793) was reprinted in 1976 under the title of Later Mughal History of the Panjab (1707–1793) by Sang-e-Meel Publications of Lahore.

Edited by Gupta, Sir Jadunath Sarkar Commemoration Volume is a two-volume work in commemoration of the historian Jadunath Sarkar. When Gupta presented his idea to Sarkar regarding the commemoration volume in 1954, he rejected it by stating that he neither wanted any publicity nor endorsed any idea involving fundraising for him, although Gupta was able to persuade him. The Life and Letters of Sir Jadunath Sarkar is the first volume of the work. It dedicates considerable space to excerpts from Sarkar's fifty-plus years of correspondence with his friend Govind Sakharam Sardesai, who was a Marathi historian. It also contains write-ups and stories about Sarkar by Sardesai, Quanungo, and his other friends. The second volume titled Essays Presented to Sir Jadunath Sarkar has around thirty essays authored by various scholars on the topics of their expertise. These volumes were published some weeks after the death of Sarkar in 1958. According to K. A. Nilakanta Sastri, this work is "a worthy memorial to him from his pupils, friends, and admirers." According to by S.K. Gupta, these two volumes "are not only examples of his deep regard for historical scholarship but also reflect his qualities of keen observation, deep penetration and acute selection."

Panjab on the eve of first Sikh war is described by William T. Walker as "a noteworthy collection of essays on the prewar conditions in Punjab that contributed to the outbreak of hostilities." His writings on the current events of his time include his multi-volume book titled India-Pakistan War, 1965.

Gupta's Marathas and Panipat describes the Third Battle of Panipat. It is divided in three parts. According to Shiv Kumar Gupta, this work is an attempt by the author to cover Maratha history from the perspective of overall Indian history at that point in time, with appropriate Central Asian history references, although its main focus lies on Marathas. Its first part consists of thirteen chapters and covers the battle's background. The second part consists of six chapters, which describes the battle. The third part deals with the battle's future impacts and the factors which led to Maratha defeat. This part also has a chapter which describes the Ala Singh's help to Marathas during the campaign.

The Asiatic Society acknowledged Gupta's work for the Punjab history by awarded him Sir Jadunath Sarkar Gold Medal in 1949. He was honoured at the 23rd session of Punjab History Conference in 1989. The Hari Ram Gupta Memorial Lecture is annually organised in his commemoration by the History department of Panjab University.

== Selected works ==
- Gupta, Hari Ram (1943). Life and Work of Mohan Lal Kashmiri, 1812–1877 (1st ed.). Lahore: Minerva Book Shop. OCLC 225191557.
- Gupta, Hari Ram (1944). Studies in the Later Mughal History of the Panjab (1707-1793) (1st ed.). Lahore: Minerva Book Shop. OCLC 221694378.
- Gupta, Hari Ram (1956). Panjab on the eve of first Sikh war: a documentary study of the political, social and economic conditions of the Panjab as depicted in the daily letters written chiefly from Lahore by British intelligencers is during the period from 30 December 1843 to 31 October 1844 (1st ed.). Hoshiarpur: Department of History, Panjab University. OCLC 575018782.
- Gupta, Hari Ram, ed. (1957). Sir Jadunath Sarkar Commemoration Volume. Vol. I: Life and Letters of Sir Jadunath Sarkar. Hoshiarpur: Department of History, Panjab University. OCLC 251228572.
- Gupta, Hari Ram; Kaushal, Paras Ram; Talwar, Shanti Swarup, eds. (1958). Sir Jadunath Sarkar Commemoration Volume. Vol. II: Essays Presented to Sir Jadunath Sarkar. Hoshiarpur: Department of History, Panjab University. OCLC 470654377.
- Gupta, Hari Ram (1961). Marathas and Panipat. Chandigarh: Panjab University. OCLC 582498407.
- Gupta, Hari Ram (1967). India-Pakistan War, 1965. Vols. I–II. Delhi: Hariyana Prakashan. OCLC 555222190.
- Gupta, Hari Ram (1984). History of the Sikhs. Vol. I: The Sikh Gurus (1469-1708) (2nd rev. ed.). New Delhi: Munshiram Manoharlal. ISBN 978-8121502764.
- Gupta, Hari Ram (1978). History of the Sikhs. Vol. II: Evolution of the Sikh Confederacies (1708–1769) (3rd rev. ed.). New Delhi: Munshiram Manoharlal. ISBN 978-8121502481.
- Gupta, Hari Ram (1980). History of the Sikhs. Vol. III: Sikh Domination of the Mughal Empire (1764-1803) (2nd rev. ed.). New Delhi: Munshiram Manoharlal. ISBN 978-8121502139.
- Gupta, Hari Ram (1982). History of the Sikhs. Vol. IV: The Sikh Commonwealth or Rise and Fall of Sikh Misls (1st ed.). New Delhi: Munshiram Manoharlal. ISBN 978-8121501651.
- Gupta, Hari Ram (1987). Panjab, Central Asia, and the First Afghan War: Based on Mohan Lal's Observations (2nd ed.). Chandigarh: Publication Bureau, Panjab University. OCLC 165473153.
- Gupta, Hari Ram (1991). History of the Sikhs. Vol. V: The Sikh Lion Of Lahore, (Maharaja Ranjit Singh, 1799-1839) (1st ed.). New Delhi: Munshiram Manoharlal. ISBN 978-8121505154.
