= Mohammad Azim Khan =

19th-century Afghan politician

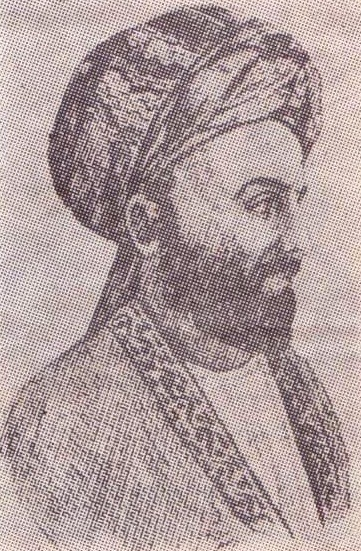
- Portrait of Mohammad Azim Khan

Afghan Governor of Kashmir
- In office 1812–1819
- Monarch: Mahmud Shah
- Preceded by: Fateh Khan
- Succeeded by: Jabbar Khan

Personal details
- Born: Kandahar, Durrani Empire
- Died: 1823 Durrani Empire
- Children: Habibullah Khan
- Parent: Payinda Khan

Military service
- Allegiance: Durrani Empire
- Battles/wars: Afghan–Sikh Wars; Battle of Kashmir (1814); Stratagem of Peshawar; Battle of Nowshera

Mohammad Azim Khan Barakzai (Note: Pashto: محمد عظيم خان بارکزی, romanized: Muhammad 'Azim Xān Bārakzai, [mu.wa.mad/mu.ham.mad ʔä.zim xɑn bɑ.ɾak.zaɪ]; Persian: محمد عظیم خان بارکزی, romanized: Muhammad 'Azīm Khān Bārakzay, [mʊ.wäm.mád̪/mo̞.ɦäm.mád̪ ʔä.zíːm xɑːn bɑː.ɾäk.záj]) was the Afghan governor of Kashmir from 1812 to 1819. He was the fifth son of the chief of the Barakzai tribe, Payandah Khan. His elder brother Fateh Khan was the kingmaker and vizier to Mahmud Shah Durrani.

== Career ==
In 1810, Azim Khan was tasked by Mahmud Shah Durrani to capture his rival for the throne, Shah Shujah Durrani, who had raised an army of partisans in Peshawar. He successfully defeated Shah Shuja's armies and was subsequently involved in the 1812-13 joint Afghan-Sikh capture of Kashmir from its rebellious governor Atta Khan Bamzai. He was appointed governor of Kashmir and in 1814 successfully repelled an attempted invasion by the Sikhs led by Ranjit Singh.

After the blinding and murder of Fateh Khan by Shahzada Kamran Durrani, Mohammad. Azim Khan became Barakzai chief and along with his brothers swore revenge against the Emir. All former Durrani Empire provinces except Herat came under Barakzai control and he set himself up as Governor of Kabul having left Kashmir in the hands of his half-brother Jabbar Khan Navab. He invited Shah Shujah Durrani back from exile but installed Ayub Shah Durrani as puppet ruler instead.

In the summer of 1819 his half-brother Yar Mohammad. Khan, governor of Peshawar, failed to impede Ranjit Singh on his march towards Kashmir and the Sikhs annexed the province after defeating Jabbar Khan in the Battle of Shopian. He attempted but failed to secure an alliance with the British while trying to secure his wealth and political position against his brothers, other Afghan nobles, the Sikhs and neighbouring rulers.

In March 1823, Azim Khan alongside other Pashtuns faced off against the Sikh Khalsa Army of Ranjit Singh at the Battle of Nowshera near Peshawar. After being repulsed on the first day he abandoned his allies, who had regrouped to continue fighting and retreated to Kabul where he died shortly thereafter. As a result, the Afghans lost their former stronghold of Peshawar Valley to the Sikh Empire.

He was reputed to have acquired great wealth through war plunder and excessive taxation, especially during his time as governor of Kashmir. Azim Khan died shortly after the battle of Nowshera from Cholera. His son Habiballah Khan inherited his estate and took control of Kabul after his death but was soon ousted by Dost Mohammad Khan.

== Bibliography ==
- Cunningham, Joseph Davey (1849). A history of the Sikhs : from the origin of the nation to the battles of the Sutlej. London " J. Murray.
- Latif, Syad Muhammad (1891). History Of The Panjab.
- Mohana Lala, Munshi (1846). Life of the Amir Dost Mohammed Khan of Kabul. London Longman, Brown, Green, and Longmans.
