= Afghan Civil War (1793–1824) =

Succession conflicts in the Durrani Empire (1793–1823)

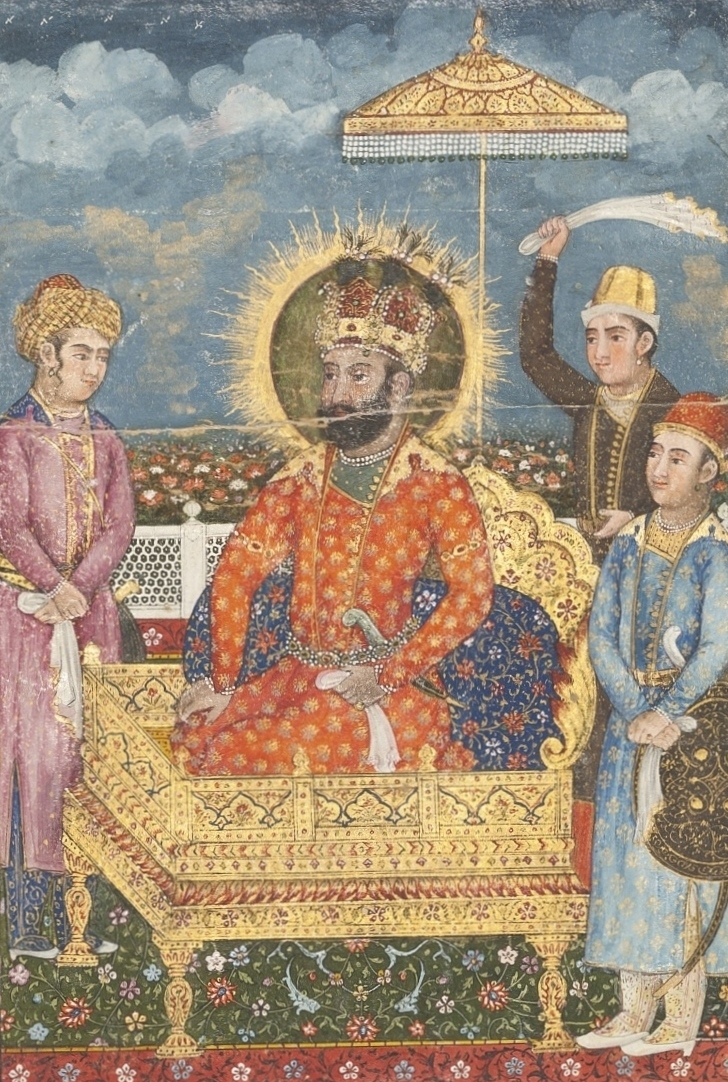
- Coronation of Zaman Shah Durrani in 1793 which created a civil war driven by a succession crisis
Date	20 May 1793 – January 1824
Location	Durrani Empire (spillover into Kalat)
Result	Barakzai victory: Overthrow of the Durrani dynasty; Beginning of the Durrani insurgency
Territorial changes	Collapse of the Durrani Empire: Herat and Kandahar created as separate independent states from the Durrani Empire; Kabul succeeds the Durrani Empire

Belligerents
Loyalists; Kabul (Zaman's Faction); Peshawar (Abbas' Faction); Khanate of Kalat (from 1794); Afsharid Iran (until 1796); Supported by: British Empire (from 1809)	Rivals; Kandahar (Humayun's Faction); Herat (Mahmud's Faction); Khanate of Kalat (until 1794); Talpur Sindh	Barakzais; Kabul Sardars; Kandahar Sardars; Peshawar Sardars; Others: Kunduz Khanate Badakhshan Mirdom Emirate of Bukhara Hotak tribesmen Sikh Confederacy (until 1799) Sikh Empire (from 1799) Qajar Iran British Empire (until 1809)

Commanders and leaders
Zaman Shah Durrani (POW); Shuja Shah Durrani (POW); Qaisar Shah Durrani; Abbas Shah Durrani (executed); Mahmud Khan Ahmadzai; Shahrokh Shah; Nader Mirza Afshar Zaman Shah: Payandah Khan (executed); Fath Allah Khan #; Rahmat Allah Khan (executed); Fateh Ali Khan; Sher Mohammad Khan; Qilij Khan Timuri; Mohammad Khan Qizilbash (executed); Qazi Fayz Allah Khan (POW); Gadu Khan Barakzai; Nur Mohammad Khan Baburi; Abd al-Ghaffar Khan; Akhtar Mohammad Khan; Amin Aslan Khan; Jafar Khan Qizilbash; Sher Muhammad Khan; Mihr Ali Khan; Abd Allah Khan; Yahya Khan Nasaqchibashi; Yusuf Khan (POW); Ahmad Khan Noorzai; Shuja Shah: Akram Khan †; Sher Mohammad Khan; Abd al-Ghafur †; Khwaja Khanji; Ahmad Khan Noorzai; Abbas Shah: Khwaja Khanji (POW); Sayyid Ata (executed); Sayyid Ashraf (executed)	Humayun Shah Durrani (POW); Mahmud Shah Durrani (POW); Firuz Shah Durrani (POW); Qaisar Shah Durrani (AWOL); Kamran Shah Durrani (WIA); Nasir Khan Ahmadzai; Behram Khan Ahmadzai; Fateh Ali Khan Talpur Humayun Shah: Ahmad Mirza Durrani; Abd al-Karim Khan; Qilij Khan Timuri (AWOL); Sayyid Khudadad Fushanji (WIA); Mullah Khudadad (WIA); Ahmad Khan Noorzai (AWOL); Mahmud Shah: Fateh Ali Khan (executed); Sher Mohammad Khan (POW); Mohammad Azim Khan; Dost Mohammad Khan; Abd Allah Khan Alakozai (executed); Saidal Khan Alakozai; Muzaffar Khan Sadozai †	Ali Shah Durrani X Ayub Shah Durrani (surrendered); Ismail Mirza Durrani †; Dost Mohammad Khan (POW); Mohammad Azim Khan # Habibullah Khan Kandahar Sardars: Sher Dil Khan; Pur Dil Khan; Kohan Dil Khan; Rahim Dil Khan; Mehr Dil Khan; Peshawar Sardars: Sultan Mohammad Khan; Ata Mohammad Khan; Yar Mohammad Khan; Pir Mohammad Khan; Sayyid Mohammad Khan; Others: Mizrab Beg Mir Mohammad Shah Shah Murad (surrendered) Haydar bin Shahmurad Ishan Naqib Abd al-Rahim Khan (executed) Naina Singh Lehna Singh Bhangi Baghel Singh Tara Singh Ghaiba Ranjit Singh Akali Phula Singh † Agha Mohammad Khan Fath-Ali Shah Qajar Hasan Ali Mirza Mirza Abdul Wahhab Khan Faiz Ali Khan

Casualties and losses
- 500,000+ total casualties including civilians

The Afghan Civil War (1793–1824) (Note: also known as the Great Afghan War, Unrest in the Afghan Realm, Durrani Civil War, and the Durrani Interregnum.: Pashto: افغان کورنۍ جنگ, romanized: Afğān Koranəi Jang; Persian: جنگ داخلی افغان, romanized: Jang-i Dākhilī-yi Afğān) was a dynastic civil war and a period of internal conflict within the Durrani Empire following Timur Shah Durrani's death, where power was contested among his sons after the ascension of Zaman Shah Durrani in 1793. This conflict ultimately ended with the deposition of the last Durrani ruler Ayub Shah Durrani by the Barakzais in early 1824.

Zaman Shah would be faced with criticism by his brothers who would not recognize his succession to the throne, in which Timur Shah Durrani's successors governed so ineptly during a period of profound unrest that within years of his death, the Durrani Empire was embroiled in civil war. By 1818, the Durrani Empire controlled little more than Kabul and its surrounding territory within a 160-kilometer radius. Much of the territory conquered by Ahmad Shah Durrani fell to others in this half century.

== Background ==
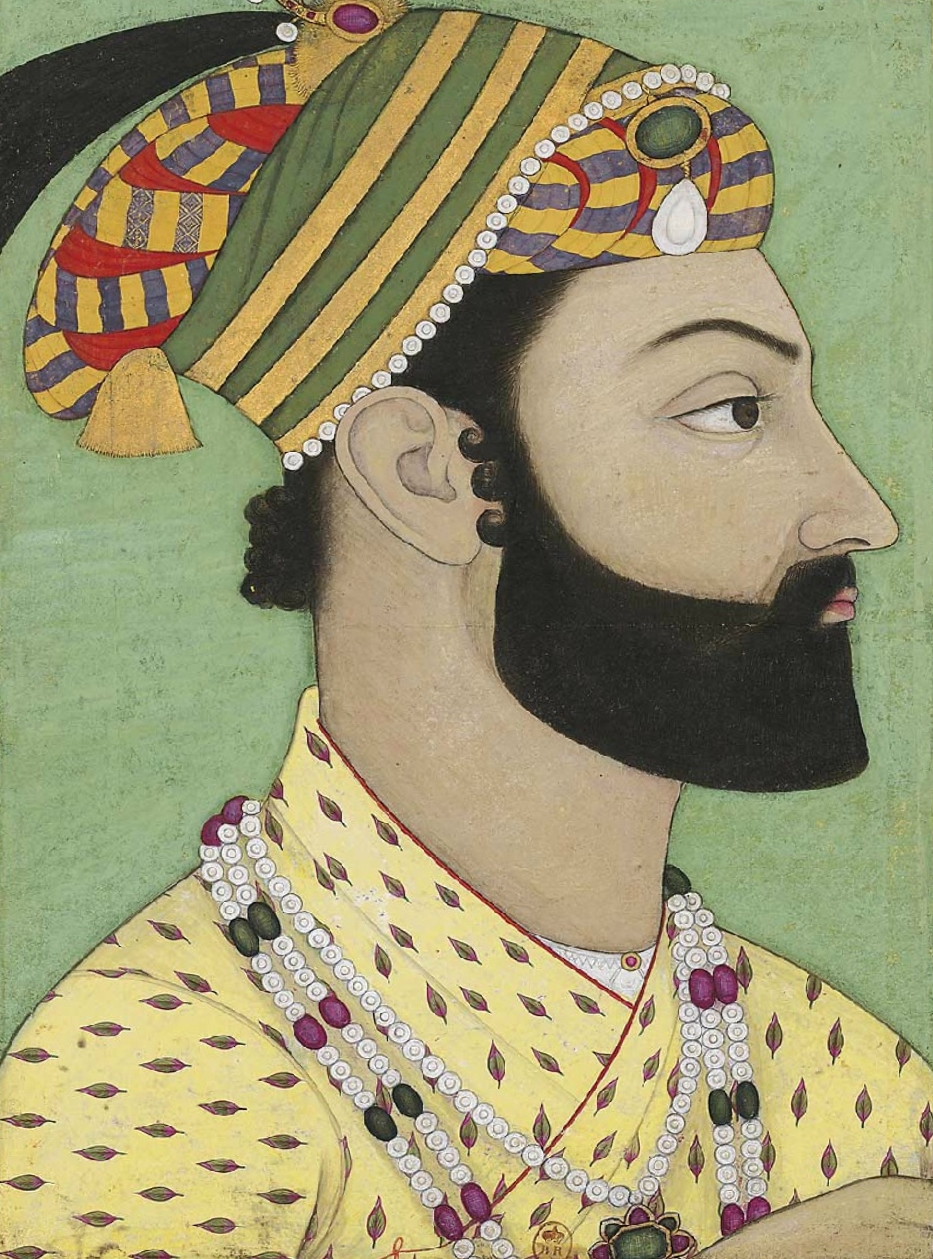
Portrait of Ahmad Shah Durrani, c. 1757

=== Founding of the Durrani Empire ===
The Durrani Empire was founded by Ahmad Khan Abdali in July 1747, the year that marked the definitive appearance of an Afghan political entity independent of both the Persian and Mughal empires. A jirga was concluded in the gathering site of Sher-i Surkh in Old Kandahar, with Ahmad Khan being selected as the new leader of the Afghans after Sabir Shah placed wheat or barley sheaves in Ahmad Khan's turban. Ahmad Shah then bore the epithet "King, Pearl of the Pearls", (Note: Persian: شاه در دران, romanized: Shāh Durr-i Durrān [ʃɑː(ʱ) d̪ʊɾ.ɾɪ d̪ʊɾ.ɾɑ́ːn]) thus the Durrani dynasty was founded. Ahmad Khan Abdali was then known as "Ahmad Shah Durrani", after re-naming the Abdali tribe into "Durrani", based on his bestowed title, which was the Persian word for "pearl".

However, Ahmad Shah's accession was disputed by Hajji Jamal Khan, chief of the Barakzai tribe. The Barakzais were the most powerful clan of the Abdalis centered in the Kandahar and Helmand regions. The dispute over accession continued until an agreement was made where Jamal Khan would submit to Ahmad Shah as king, while Ahmad Shah would appoint Jamal Khan and his descendants as viziers. Despite being younger than the other contenders, Ahmad Shah had several overriding factors in his favor. He belonged to a respectable family of political background, especially since his father Mohammad Zaman Khan was the Sultan of Herat.

=== Succession crisis ===
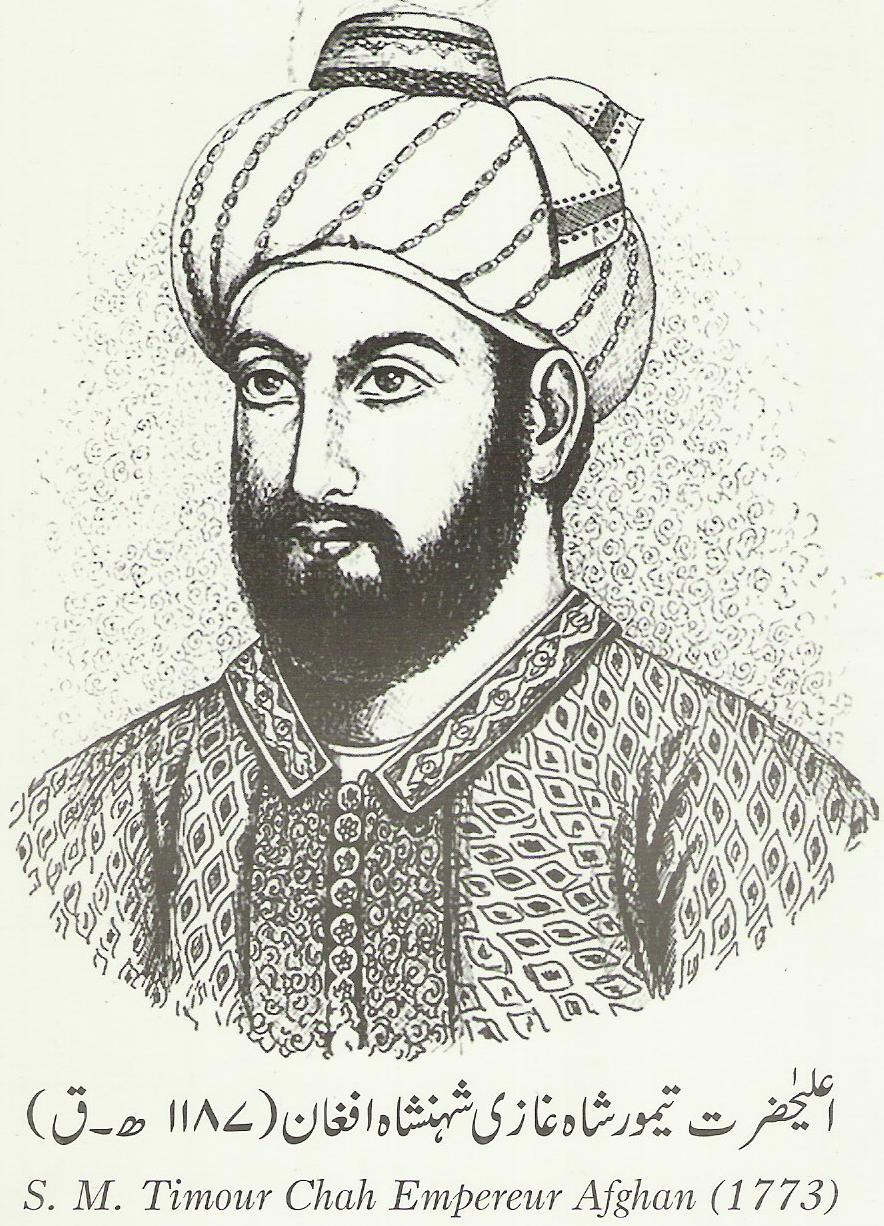
Depiction of Timur Shah Durrani

In Afghan society, succession crisis was a common and a violent consequence of a king's death, especially when one of the king's sons was a primary contender for the throne. It would mainly be driven by jealousy over the selected son who was honored to be a successor, and often due to the absence of an accepted system of primogeniture, which often led to fierce rivalries. Each prince would backed by different factions and tribes, to which they would continuously vie for power while creating internal strife and instability, as the sons often sought to gain the loyalty of influential tribal leaders, military commanders and other key figures.

Before his death, Ahmad Shah chose his younger son, Timur Mirza Durrani, to succeed him, passing over his eldest son, Sulaiman Mirza Durrani. The announcement led to an internal conflict between factions loyal to Sulaiman and Timur. Ahmad Shah dismissed the faction of Sulaiman, proclaiming Timur far more capable than Sulaiman. However, Timur was left as governor at Herat, allowing the faction of Sulaiman to grow their influence in the Durrani capital of Kandahar. Upon Ahmad Shah's death, the faction of Sulaiman refused the throne to Timur, and gave it to Sulaiman, triggering a short civil war. Timur emerged victorious without battle, as support for Sulaiman had dissipated, and he fled to India. Later during the reign of Timur, his brother Sikander would become the main focus of a conspiracy to succeed to the Durrani throne after a plot on Timur's life that nearly succeeded in Peshawar.

== Civil war ==
=== Background ===
During this time, the Durrani Empire lost significant territory, as the Kunduz Khanate and Saighan became independent which later fell under Bukharan suzerainty, while the Khozeimeh Amirdom and the Qara Bayat Amirdom also gained independence, only to later fall under Qajar suzerainty. Even though the Sikhs have been defeated in Multan, the Durrani Empire had clear signs of being dragged into a downfall as it was ruled ineptly, the decade of prolonged sieges had drained the empire's financial resources.

=== Battle of Kandahar ===
Not abiding by the elections that took place in Kabul, Durrani tribal leaders had rebelled in Kandahar and installed Humayun Shah Durrani as king, while getting Mahmud Mirza and Firuz Mirza in Herat to submit to him. Zaman Shah sent his full brother Shuja Mirza Durrani, alongside with Payandah Khan to deal with this rebellion, and defeated Humayun Shah and the Durrani rebels near Qalat. When Mahmud Mirza and Firuz Mirza heard of the fall of Kandahar, they shifted their allegiance to Zaman Shah, who honored his pledge to his father and allowed them to remain governors of Herat.

Zaman Shah, wanting to further secure his throne from the growing popularity of Mahmud Mirza in Herat and older brother Humayun Shah in Kandahar, wanted to mobilize his army to march on Kandahar to prevent them uniting against his rule. Humayun Shah, disregarded the advice to stay in defense within Kandahar's great walls and wait for Mahmud Shah's reinforcements to arrive from Herat, and marched out to meet Zaman Shah's army and was defeated at Qalat. Humayun Shah was forced to flee to Balochistan, being placed under house arrest by Nasir Khan Ahmadzai, to which he later escaped. With his victory, Zaman Shah secured Kandahar.

=== Second Battle of Kandahar ===
Zaman Shah marched to the winter capital of Peshawar, and heard the news of his brother Humayun Shah seizing Kandahar with the assistance of the Talpurs of Sindh. He turned from Peshawar to meet him at Kandahar, to which Humayun was forced to flee again after being betrayed by the Afghans in Kandahar, but this time to Sindh. He then attempted to escape to Herat in the domain of his brother Mahmud Shah, to which he was captured with a detachment of horses and ordered by Zaman Shah to be blinded, making sure Kandahar wouldn't be under threat from him once again.

=== Persian invasion ===
As a result, Zaman Shah was forced to withdraw from his invasion of India and prepare an army to invade Mashhad. However, due to Agha Mohammad Khan Qajar's assassination on 17 June 1797, Nader Mirza Afshar had resumed control and restored his allegiance to the Durrani throne.

=== Siege of Herat ===
Zaman Shah, seeing Mahmud Shah as a future threat if the Persians had ever invaded again, broke the reconciliation and decided to try and retake Herat and strip Mahmud of his administrative titles. Zaman Shah then met Mahmud at a battle near Grishk, and defeated Mahmud Shah, which allowed him to besiege Herat. The city held out and eventually, Mahmud Shah's mother had broken a deal between the two brothers. The terms of which would be Zaman Shah's kingship would be recognized in exchange for keeping his governorship of Herat. Kamran Mirza Durrani, the son of Mahmud Shah, noticing Zaman Shah leaving back to Helmand, led the army of the city in pursuit. Once Kamran Mirza had left, Qilij Khan, the governor of Herat in place for Kamran, had led a rebellion and opened the gates to Zaman Shah. Mahmud Shah and Kamran had then fled to Tehran.

=== First Bukharan invasion ===
Taking advantage of the civil war, the Bukharans led by Shah Murad occupied Aqcha after defeating Mohammad Khan Qizilbash, imprisoning him and other Qizilbash soldiers. The surviving soldiers retreated to the Balkh citadel and were then chased by the Bukharans, but couldn't take the citadel within the four-month siege, especially after executing the imprisoned Qizilbash commander while sending multiple failed threats. Eventually, Shah Murad admitted defeat and sent envoys to Kabul to negotiate a truce, which led the Bukharans to withdraw back across the Oxus.

=== Return of Mahmud Shah ===
The sons of Payandah Khan then fled to Persia and pledged allegiance to Mahmud Shah Durrani which led to the latter's rise in popularity after a long time and an era of retiring. Mahmud Shah's army then marched to Farah while he led speeches and rallies against Zaman Shah, announcing his intention to become king while exposing the tyrannies of Zaman Shah and Fath Allah Khan. With this, Mahmud Shah gained the large support of the Barakzai and Popalzai tribes while he marched on Kandahar.

Mahmud Shah had begun sieging the city, and the city garrison held fierce for 42 days. However, on the 43rd day, Fateh Ali Khan had managed to gain the support of two additional tribal chiefs in Kandahar, and the city finally fell to Mahmud Shah's forces. Zaman Shah, unaware of what had happened at Kandahar, had been focused on Persia's movements. After receiving intelligence, he shifted his focus on what the Barakzais might do next in Kabul. Zaman Shah left most of his forces with his brother Shuja Mirza Durrani in Peshawar.

=== Deposition of Zaman Shah ===
Mahmud Shah had led efforts to imprison Zaman Shah and sent the latter multiple threats. Zaman Shah, feeling helpless, resigned to his fate and hid his jewels including the Koh-i-Noor, Daria-i-Noor and the Timur Ruby. Zaman Shah was then imprisoned and blinded by Asad Khan, a surgeon ordered by Mahmud Shah. Zaman Shah eventually escaped from Kabul and sought refuge at Rawalpindi, where he was met by Ranjit Singh, who gave him a house to stay in, but later due to his safety concerns, Ranjit Singh welcomed him to stay in Lahore, with a monthly allowance of 1,500 rupees.

== Reign of Mahmud Shah Durrani ==
=== Ghilji rebellion (1801–1802) ===
Resenting their subjugation to Durrani rule in their own domains and recalling their legacy at Isfahan, the Hotak and Tokhi tribes of the Ghilji tribal confederacy rebelled against Mahmud Shah Durrani in 1801. The internal instability within the Durrani Empire followed by the rivalry between Mahmud Shah and Shuja Shah provided an opening for the Ghilji rebels to attempt a power bid, and rapidly gained strength in Kandahar, marched toward Ghazni, and defeated its governor in open battle, but could not capture the Ghazni citadel.

=== 1803 anti-Shia riots in Kabul ===
Triggered by the fall of Mashhad to the Persians in 1803, the Sunni factions of Kabul led by clerics used the loss as an advantage to target the Qizilbash, who were mainly Shia, and were always disliked by the native Afghans as they were considered "foreign". Sher Mohammad Khan Bamizai rallied Kabul’s Sunni clergy by creating an anti-Shia coalition by aligning with Sayyid Mir Ahmad Agha, known to his followers as Khwaja Khanji, head preacher of the Pul-e Khishti Mosque and custodian of the Ashiqan wa Arifan shrine.

As Mahmud Shah hid inside the Bala Hissar instead of cracking down on rioters, the anti-Shia coalition led by Sher Mohammad Khan and Khwaja Khanji pulled in massive tribal reinforcements that launched repetitive attacks while ringing Chindawol, which included several thousand mobs, 20,000 men from Kohistan, Logar, and Tagab, as well as several thousand Ghilji and Safi tribesmen. The Qizilbash Army's fortified mahallah had thick walls, elevated firing positions, and arms stockpiled. Well-aimed volleys cut down hundreds of attackers. The besiegers pushed artillery and sharpshooters onto the Sher Darwaza heights overlooking the quarter, turning the fight into a grinding siege, as the clerics mobilized more fighters and launched diversionary attacks against both Chindawol and the Bala Hissar. Fateh Ali Khan, returning from the south with 10,000 Hazara troops, finally broke the stalemate by backing the Qizilbash defenders, scattering the mobs and forcing the tribal levies to retreat. The standoff dragged on for nearly a month, with over 400 people dying.

The aftermath of the riots resulted in weakening of Mahmud Shah's authority and his slow decline to which Sher Mohammad Khan regrouped with Mirwais and Ahmad Khan Noorzai, after accusing Mahmud Shah of "siding with heretics". Sher Mohammad went to Peshawar and offered to help Shuja Shah Durrani's legitimacy by deposing Mahmud Shah, in return to be vizier. Upon the acceptance of Shuja Shah, they defeated Mahmud Shah with the help of many army defectors and Khwaja Khanji's supporters, marching on Kabul on 12 July 1803.

== Reign of Shuja Shah Durrani ==
Shuja Shah Durrani, being the governor of Herat and Peshawar from 1798 to 1801, proclaimed himself as king of Afghanistan after the deposition of his brother Zaman Shah Durrani on October 1801, but only properly ascended to the throne on 13 July 1803 after overthrowing Mahmud Shah Durrani who overthrew the latter. After coming to power in 1803, Zaman Shah Durrani was freed from prison, and Mahmud Shah Durrani took over his place, but was not blinded. Moreover, Shuja Shah ended the blood feud with the Barakzai family and also forgave them. To create an alliance with them, he married their sister Wafa Begum.

=== Instigations and civil unrest ===
With the intention of asserting his suzerainty, Shuja Shah marched to Sindh and Kashmir through way of Peshawar alongside 30,000 men. However, Shuja Shah quickly returned to Kandahar and defeated his rebellious nephew Qaisar Mirza Durrani, the son of former king Zaman Shah Durrani, who was instigated into challenging the throne by Fateh Ali Khan, and whom Shuja Shah had appointed as the Governor of Kandahar following his installation to the throne. Qaisar Mirza was then pardoned, and was pardoned again after he rebelled again, but swore loyalty and cut contact with Fateh Khan, and was re-installed as the Governor of Kandahar.

== Second reign of Mahmud Shah Durrani ==
=== Battle of Nimla ===
On 29 June 1809, Shuja Shah Durrani was overthrown by his predecessor Mahmud Shah Durrani in the Battle of Nimla, and went into exile in the Punjab, where he was captured by Jahandad Khan Bamizai and imprisoned at Attock in 1812, and then taken to Kashmir by Ata Mohammad Khan. When Mahmud Shah's vizier Fateh Ali Khan invaded Kashmir alongside Ranjit Singh's army, Shuja chose to leave with the Sikh army. He stayed in Lahore from 1813 to 1814. During his time in India, Shuja was imprisoned and forced to give up the Timur Ruby, Koh-i-Noor, and the sister diamond Daria-i-Noor to Ranjit Singh. He escaped from Ranjit's detention at the Mubarak Haveli Lahore for Ludhiana and the East India Company.

=== Administrative reorganization ===
Following Mahmud Shah Durrani's restoration, he re-appointed Fateh Ali Khan as Prime Minister, and deposed many key governors and personal enemies, while appointing the latter's uterine brothers as governors among different regions:

- Dost Mohammad Khan: Deputy of Kabul
- Mohammad Azim Khan: Peshawar
- Abd al-Samad Khan: Sindh
- Asad Allah Khan: Derajat
- Mohammad Zaman Khan: Jalalabad
- Pur Dil Khan: Kandahar
- Sher Dil Khan: Ghazni
- Kohan Dil Khan: Bamyan
- Rahim Dil Khan: Balochistan
- Mehr Dil Khan: Foreign Minister

Being king of the Durrani Empire, Mahmud Shah Durrani passed his kingship of Herat to his brother Firuz Mirza Durrani, who ruled Herat as a semi-independent state.

=== Revolt of Khwaja Khanji ===
Mahmud Shah Durrani's alliance with the Sikhs to recapture Kashmir antagonized the Sunni factions of Kabul led by Khwaja Khanji, leading to Sayyid Ata and Sayyid Ashraf to rebel and place Abbas Mirza Durrani on the throne. Fateh Ali Khan paused his campaigns in Kashmir and Attock, and went back to the Durrani winter capital of Peshawar alongside Mahmud Shah to depose the newly-installed usurper king Abbas Shah. All ringleaders were then executed by being crushed by an elephant, except for Khwaja Khanji who managed to escape.

=== Second Bukharan invasion ===
The civil war in the Durrani Empire gave the empire's enemies many advantages and encouraged them to assert authority in unsupervised lands. On the Islamic date of Safar in 1233 (adjacent to late 1817 or early 1818), the Emir of Bukhara, Haydar bin Shahmurad, occupied the cities of Aqcha and Balkh, and expelled their Durrani governors, in an attempt to restore Bukharan influence in the Balkh region.

=== Siege of Multan (1818) ===
On 12 March 1818, the first maharaja of the Sikh Empire and the former deputy of Lahore under Zaman Shah Durrani, Ranjit Singh, also took advantage of the civil war and forced the Durrani governor of Multan, Muzaffar Khan Sadozai to accept Sikh suzerainty. Following Muzaffar Khan's refusal, the Sikh army commanded by French and Italian officers, marched on Multan on 2 June 1818, after plundering the towns of Muzaffarabad and Shujabad, making the siege of Multan last 82 days. Multan Fort finally fell on 2 June 1818, and Muzaffar Khan was killed alongside his five sons and one daughter who fought to defend Multan until their last stand.

=== Assassination of Fateh Ali Khan ===
In August 1818, Fateh Ali Khan was assassinated, but the way Fateh was assassinated and the reasoning behind his assassination is contested among various accounts. Despite reasoning differing among accounts, most historians mutually agree that Fateh Ali Khan was killed by the Durranis, and this led to an uprising initiated by the Barakzai half-brothers, who were united once again:

According to Lee, Fateh Ali Khan was deceived by Kamran Mirza Durrani who had mustered a substantial army by his side, claiming he was coming to invite Fateh to a morning meal with honor and kindness, and to be congratulated by the king for his victory over Persia. Regardless of his advisers warning him against attending, Fateh attended and found all of his sworn enemies. Nonetheless, Fateh participated in the celebration and began eating with the guests. However, as it progressed, the different enemies began berating him with insults and informing him of the crimes his family had committed. As Fateh had enough, he rose in anger and wished to leave, but was grabbed and pinned to the tablecloth. With this, Ata Muhammad Khan then blinded Fateh with his dagger. Fateh was then imprisoned, and in the following days, his eyes were removed. Lee had stated that this may have happened due to Fateh Ali Khan deposing Firuz Mirza Durrani from ruling Herat, pillaged the city and did acts of atrocities once they entered the royal harem alongside the former's uterine brother Dost Mohammad Khan. This then angered Mahmud Shah Durrani who ordered Kamran to capture Herat once again, and to punish Fateh Ali Khan.

According to Dalrymple, Fateh was invited to a party in the royal garden outside the fortress of Herat. Fateh Khan and some of his brothers attended, and they became intoxicated after drinking much wine. Kamran then capitalized off of this, and having planned for this to happen, the other guests of the event tied up Fateh and blinded him. Fateh Khan was then tortured, with a scalping occurring.

== Deposition of the Durranis ==
=== Reign of Ali Shah Durrani ===
Following Fateh Ali Khan's execution by Kamran Mirza Durrani, a vendetta was triggered between the Durranis and the Barakzais, leading to a national uprising, all while the headship of the Barakzai family was passed on to Fateh Khan's younger uterine brother Mohammad Azim Khan. The Dil Brothers led by Sher Dil Khan captured Kandahar and established their own principality.

Azim Khan sought an alliance with the former king Shuja Shah Durrani in an attempt to enlist support for his cause and to overthrow Mahmud Shah Durrani, but demanded absolute power, so Azim Khan turned to another one of Timur Shah Durrani's sons, Ayub Mirza Durrani. However, Dost Mohammad Khan then betrayed Azim Khan and installed Ali Shah Durrani onto the throne.

This angered Azim Khan, making him pause his campaigns against the Sikhs, and to march against his uterine brother Dost Mohammad Khan in Kabul, in which Dost Mohammad then retreated to Ghazni. Azim Khan decided to stay in Kabul, and appointed his younger brother Yar Mohammad Khan as governor of Peshawar.

With the Barakzais having power over the Afghan army, treasury and administration, their Durrani puppets would remain heads of state to represent the old Durrani legitimacy of Ahmad Shah Durrani's lineage. Ali Shah's reign was short-lived as he was overthrown by his brother Ayub Mirza months later, after being strangled by the latter's son Ismail Mirza Durrani on December 1818, on the orders of Azim Khan.

=== Reign of Ayub Shah Durrani ===
Ayub Shah Durrani then ascended to the throne, following the assassination of Ali Shah Durrani. The Afghan defeat at Shopian and the flight of Azim Khan to Jalalabad after the Battle of Nowshera exposed military weakness under the Barakzais, and undermined Azim Khan's authority, following a successful Sikh siege that resulted in the capture of the Peshawar valley, and the capture of the Durrani winter capital of Peshawar. Being entirely dependent on Azim Khan, Ayub Shah Durrani had no real authority nor did he have any support among the Barakzai brothers, to which he lost his main source of support, after Azim Khan left his son Habibullah Khan as the new vizier after succumbing to cholera.

The lack of support and the redundancy of the Durrani heads of state allowed the Barakzais to plot against Ayub Shah Durrani. Habibullah Khan feared the rivalry of Ismail Mirza Durrani and called the Kandahar Sardars for assistance. Pur Dil Khan seized the Bala Hissar while the Barakzais led by him looted the palace, leaving Ayub Shah's son Ismail Mirza Durrani killed in the process. Ayub Shah was publicly humiliated by being paraded on a donkey, ransomed, and exiled to India. The Durranis were left helpless for they had no army, nor did they have coherent tribal support nor any ability to enforce authority.

The deposition of Ayub Shah Durrani marked the end of the Durrani Empire and end of Durrani rule in Afghanistan, even though the Durranis continued to rule in Herat as a separate dominion under Mahmud Shah Durrani and his son Kamran Mirza Durrani, leaving the Barakzai heirs of Hajji Jamal Khan to be the rulers of Kandahar and Kabul, and later in Herat from 1857 to 1863. Habibullah Khan would be the next titular head of Afghanistan, marking the beginning of Barakzai rule in Afghanistan.

=== Durrani insurgency ===
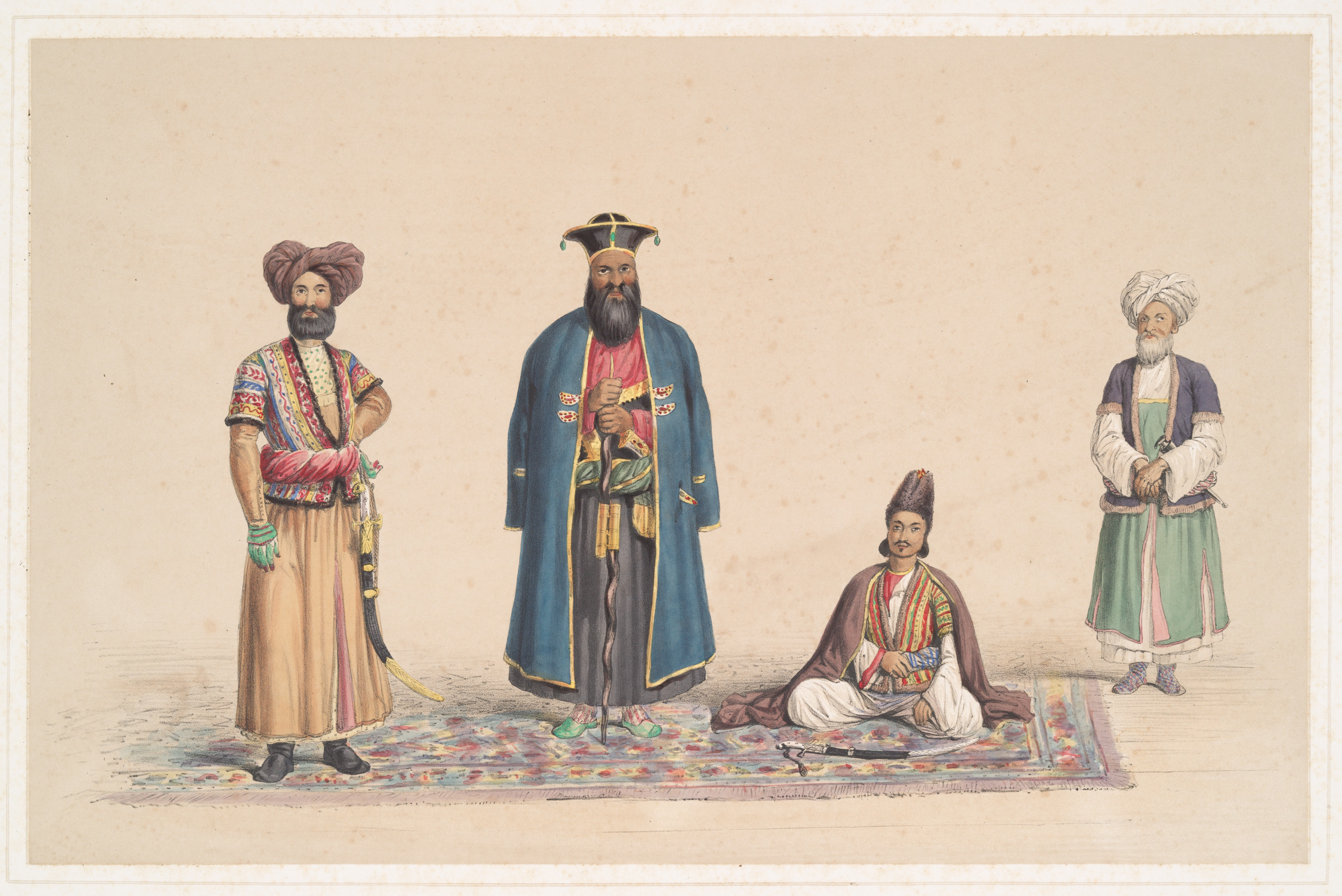
Shuja Shah Durrani (centered) with his sons Timur Mirza (left) and Safdar Jang Mirza (right), accompanied by his vizier Mullah Shakur (far right)

The Durranis led by the former king Shuja Shah Durrani, backed by the British and the Sikhs, later fell into an insurgency to seize the Afghan throne for themselves in the Kandahar Expedition and during the First Anglo-Afghan War, especially among his sons Fateh Jang Durrani and Shahpur Shah Durrani. Shuja Shah would be initially successful after conquering Kandahar and Kabul, but this would be met with an end after the restoration of the Barakzai dynasty under Dost Mohammad Khan backed by his son Mohammad Akbar Khan, following the assassination of Shuja Shah and the deposition of Fateh Jang. This would also lead to Mohammad Akbar Khan being the de facto head of state, ruling under Shahpur Shah's name until the arrival and restoration of Dost Mohammad Khan to the throne, similarly to how his father ruled under Ali Shah Durrani's name and how Mohammad Azim Khan ruled under Ayub Shah Durrani's name.

The Durranis were not only expelled from Kandahar and Kabul, but also from Herat after Yar Mohammad Khan of the Alakozai tribe assassinated and deposed Kamran Shah Durrani in early 1842. The Durrani kingdom still ceased to exist in Herat, despite not being ruled by the Durrani dynasty. Following Yar Mohammad's death on 11 June 1851, his son Said Mohammad Khan was deposed by Mohammad Yusuf Mirza Durrani, the grandson of Firuz Shah Durrani, in September 1855. However, the Durrani comeback was cut short due to the Second Herat War, in which Mohammad Yusuf Mirza declared his kingdom a vassal state of the British Empire, to which he was then betrayed and handed over to Iran by his vizier Isa Khan Bardurrani who later surrendered on 25 October 1856.

When Mohammad Afzal Khan's grip on power was weak after becoming Emir during the Afghan Civil War (1863–1869) on 10 May 1866, conspiracies and resistance emerged, especially among his nephew Mohammad Rafiq Khan, who had written a letter to Shahpur Shah, offering him to return from Ludhiana and ascend to the Afghan throne, but Rafiq was later executed as an act of treason.

== See also ==
- Durrani Empire
- Kingdom of Herat
- Durrani dynasty
- Principality of Kandahar
- Principality of Kabul
- Barakzai dynasty
- Ahmad Shah Durrani
- Timur Shah Durrani
- Afghan succession crisis of 1772
- Kandahar Expedition (1833–1834)
- Campaigns of Dost Mohammad Khan
- First Anglo-Afghan War
- Afghan Civil War (1863–1869)
- Second Anglo-Afghan War
- Khost rebellion (1924–1925)
- Afghan Civil War (1928–1929)
- Afghan conflict
- Soviet–Afghan War
- Afghan Civil War (1989–1992)
- Afghan Civil War (1992–1996)
- Afghan Civil War (1996–2001)
- War in Afghanistan (2001–2021)
- Islamic State–Taliban conflict
- Republican insurgency in Afghanistan
