= Kandahar Expedition (1833–1834) =

Shah Shujah's expedition to Kandahar

- Part of the Durrani insurgency
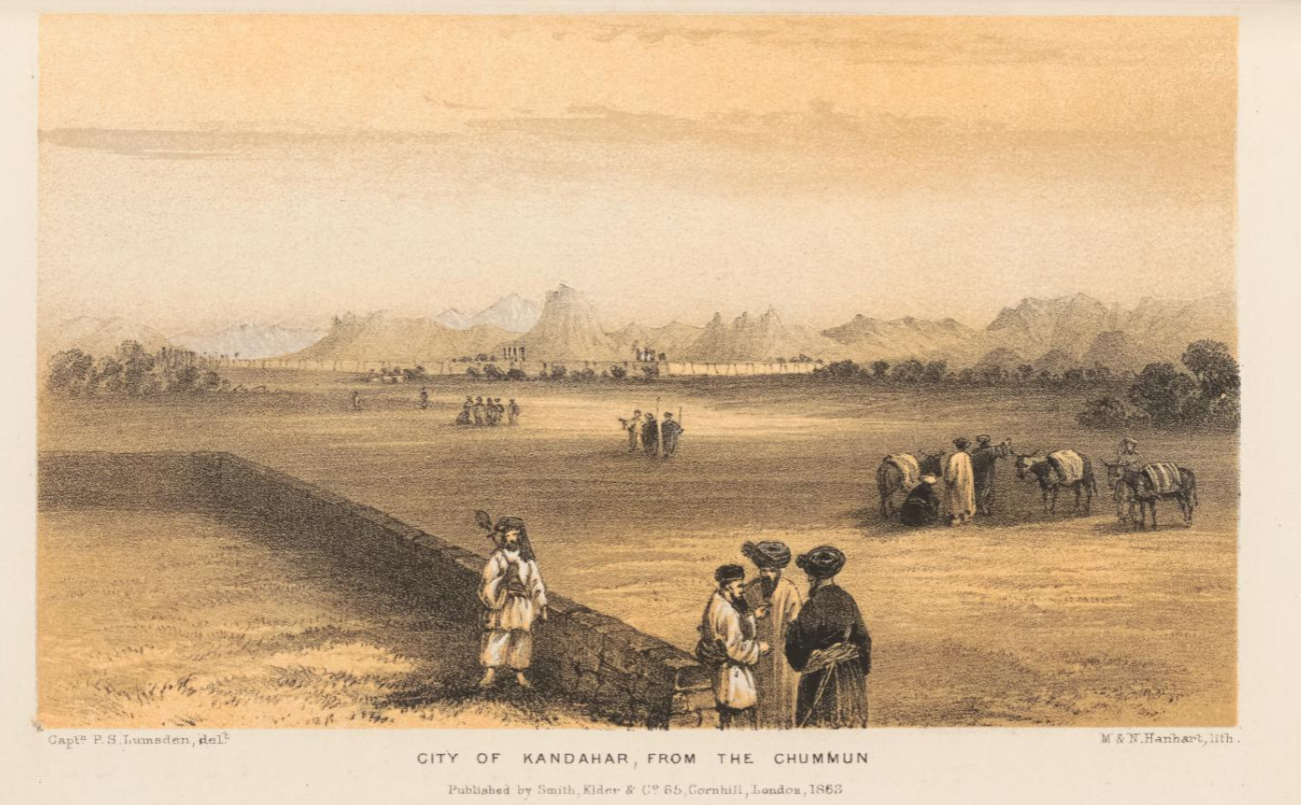
- Sketch of Kandahar in 1857
Date	January 1833 – 1 July 1834
Location	Kandahar
Result	Barakzai Afghan - Principality of Kandahar victory; Shuja Shah Durrani forced to retreat; Beginning of the Standoff at the Khyber Pass (1834–1835)

Belligerents
Barakzais; Principality of Kandahar; Principality of Kabul (1833–1834); Emirate of Kabul (1834)	Durranis; Durrani Empire (in exile): British Empire; East India Company; Supported by: Sikh Empire

Commanders and leaders
Pur Dil Khan; Kohan Dil Khan; Rahim Dil Khan; Mehr Dil Khan; Dost Mohammad Khan; Mohammad Afzal Khan	Shuja Shah Durrani (WIA) (East India Company) William Campbell (POW)

Strength
Numerically inferior 20,000 men from Dost Mohammad (only 3,000 engaged by Dost Mohammad)	30,000 (Initial); 80,000 men (during siege of Kandahar)

Casualties and losses
Unknown	Heavy losses Up to 16,000 killed

Beginning in January 1833, Shah Shujah Durrani, the deposed Afghan emperor, led an expedition to re-claim his throne. Raising a force while in exile in the Sikh Empire, he marched through Sindh to Kandahar, besieging it from 10 May 1834 until 1 July 1834. Shah Shujah would be defeated by the Barakzai rulers of Kandahar and Kabul.

== Background ==
Following the death of Timur Shah Durrani, the Durrani Empire was plunged into a succession crisis with Timur Shah's 24 sons. Prominent sons of these would be Mahmud Shah Durrani, Zaman Shah Durrani, and Shah Shujah Durrani. Zaman Shah Durrani would take the throne after the death of Timur Shah in a succession crisis, where Mahmud Shah Durrani was confined to ruling the Realm of Herat, while Shah Shujah would work for Zaman Shah ordinated at Peshawar. Mahmud Shah would be forced to flee to Persia after Zaman Shah would invade Herat. Mahmud Shah would return on multiple attempts to seize the throne from his brother, finally succeeding in 1801. Shah Shujah Durrani would attempt to thwart Mahmud Shah's attempts, but was repelled and was forced to flee.

Shah Shujah would return with rebel leaders, Sher Muhammad Khan to topple Mahmud Shah and would succeed, placing himself on the throne in 1803, making Mahmud Shah's reign last just under 2 years.

Mahmud Shah Durrani returned in 1809, plotting to usurp the throne once again, Mahmud centralized his forces with Fateh Khan and his son, Kamran at Kandahar before marching to Kabul. Shuja Shah Durrani, seeing this had scrambled his forces at Jalalabad and met Mahmud Shah's army at the old Kabul-Jalalabad Road near Nimla. Shah Shujah had previously attempted a campaign in Kashmir, and his forces were repelled, hence he was unable to bring together a proper army to try and repel Mahmud Shah Durrani and his allies, being defeated in the Battle of Nimla.

Shah Shujah thus lost the crown and fled to exile in the Sikh Empire, where he began plans to reclaim Afghanistan under his own rule.

== Siege of Kandahar ==
Seeking to launch another attempt to reclaim his rule in Afghanistan, Shah Shujah marched his men through the Bolan Pass in April, which coincided with Ranjit Singh moving from Lahore to attack Peshawar and dislodge Barakzai rule there. In May 1834, Shah Shujah reached Kandahar and besieged the city, but had trouble effectively storming it due to lack of siege equipment and poor quality of troops. Despite this, Shah Shujah had a great numerical superiority over his Barakzai enemies, with some estimations that his army had reached a size of over 80,000 men. Despite this, Shah Shujah feared the arrival of Dost Mohammad to aid his half-brothers in Kandahar, but still believed he was miles from reaching Kandahar.

On 29 June, the Shah Shujah ordered his men to scale the walls of Kandahar with ladders, however they were defeated, with many being killed and wounded from the failed assault. Short skirmishes followed after this until Dost Mohammad Khan had arrived, who now began clashing with Shah Shujah's force. When Dost Mohammad arrived, skirmishes and clashes broke out even further, and at one point, Shah Shujah chose to fight in the day instead of night, wishing to give his soldiers time to rest after being fatigued. Thus, Shah Shujah began battle again and overcame Dost Mohammad's force, who was slowly being pushed back, as Shah Shujah's forces reached the walls of Kandahar. However, following this, much of the Barakzai troops who had drawn up on the flanks began engaging Shah Shujah's armies, with over 3,000 men under Dost Mohammad Khan and Sardar Mir Afzal Khan. Sardar Mir Afzal Khan himself attacked Shah Shujah. Shah Shujah was wounded during the battle, fearing to be captured, fled. When his forces saw him fleeing, they abandoned and fled the battlefield. As the rout commenced, an English general, William Campbell, was wounded and also captured by the Barakzai forces.

== Aftermath ==
With this, Shah Shujah was forced to withdraw, and leave behind all his baggage. Amongst the baggage captured, Dost Mohammad found out of British aid in the expedition of Shah Shujah. This would not be the last attempt of Shah Shujah to seize the throne of Afghanistan, as in 1839, he, alongside British forces would contend with Dost Mohammad Khan for rule over Kabul in the First Anglo-Afghan War.
