= Conquest of Kandahar =

Dost Mohammad's conquest of Kandahar

- Part of Campaigns of Dost Mohammad Khan
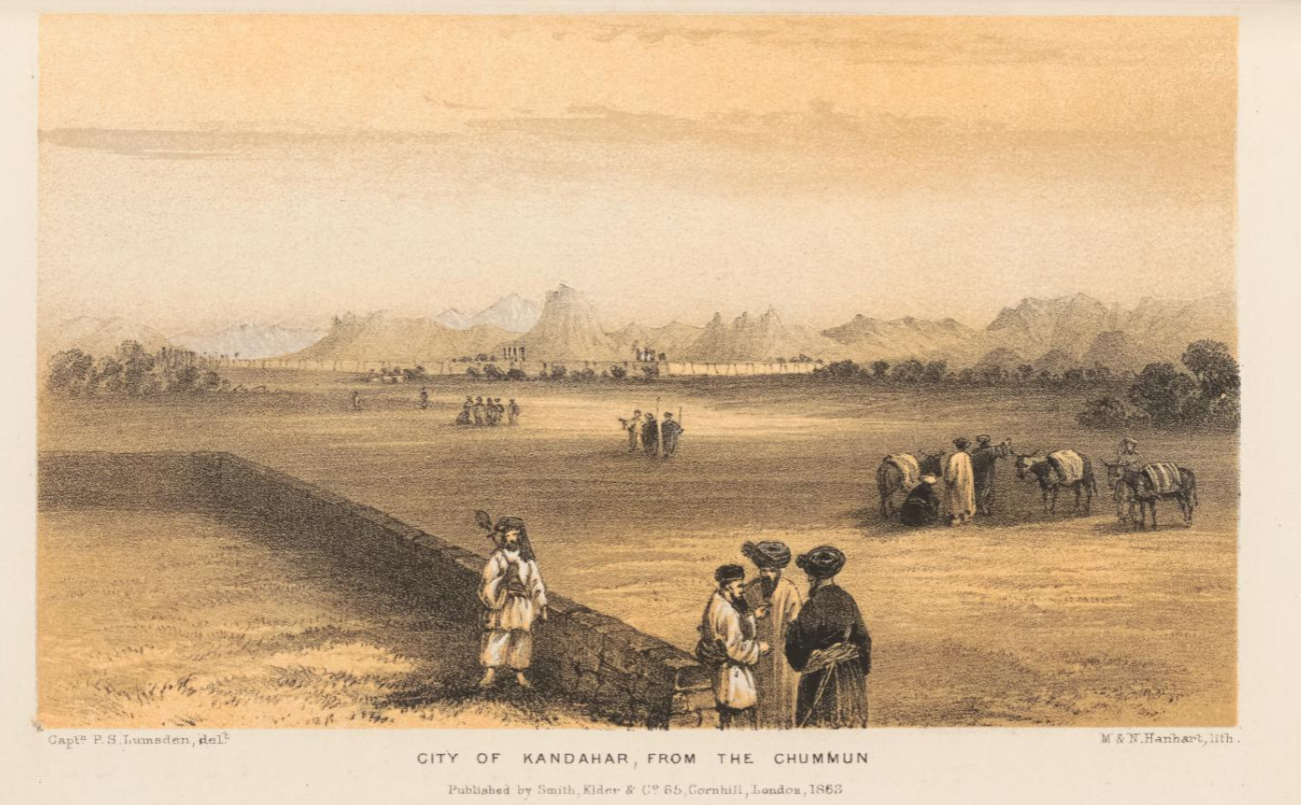
- Sketch of Kandahar in 1857
Date	14 November 1855 – September 1856
Location	Kandahar
Result	Afghan victory
Territorial changes	Kandahar incorporated into the Emirate of Afghanistan

Belligerents
Principality of Kandahar Successionists	Emirate of Afghanistan

Commanders and leaders
Rahim Dil Khan; Sultan Ahmad Khan; Khush Dil Khan Mohammad Sadiq Khan (surrendered); Mohammad Alam Khan (surrendered); Sultan Ali Khan (surrendered); Mohammad Umar Khan (surrendered)	Dost Mohammad Khan; Sher Ali Khan; Ghulam Haidar Khan; Mohammad Azam Khan; Karim Khan; Sharif Khan; Jalal al-Din Khan

Strength
Unknown; 600 men on the conspiracy at Mala Khan	880 men (in coup); Unknown number of entourage troops

The Conquest of Kandahar took place on 14 November 1855, and its consolidation lasted as long as September 1856. Following the death of Kohan Dil Khan, the ruler of Kandahar under the Dil brothers, the region had fallen into a succession crisis between Rahmdil Khan, the brother of Kohandil, and Kohandil's sons, who wished to gain power for themselves. Dost Mohammad Khan, the ruler of the Emirate of Afghanistan, sought to take advantage of the anarchy and chaos, and conquer Kandahar for himself.

== Background ==
in 1852, Kohan Dil Khan, the ruler of Kandahar, was disturbed by the punishment of the Tokhi and Hotaki of Qalat by Dost Mohammad Khan. Kohandil Khan was worried that this would see the rise of greater influence from Dost Mohammad in the region and possibly stake claim to Kandahar and intervene in the region, ultimately to conquer it and unite the two Barakzai realms. Due to this, Kohandil Khan deployed his younger brother, Mihrdil Khan, with 4,000 men toward Qalat. Kohandil Khan also dispatched several field pieces to fortify the Qalat citadel so that if Dost Mohammad ever attempted to seize Qalat, the citadel could hold out, thus challenging Dost Mohammad. Upon hearing this, Dost Mohammad dispatched Sher Ali from Ghazni to Qalat, also sending Sardar Haidar Khan from Kabul with an army. The two brothers united armies while marching on Kandahar. The forces of Haidar Khan and Sher Ali reached Qalat, and Haidar Khan's cavalrymen rode up to the walls, but were driven off by cannon fire by forces under Mihrdil Khan. Haidar Khan relayed news of what occurred to Dost Mohammad. Dost Mohammad placed Sardar Muhammad Azam Khan as Regent in Kabul, and marched for Qalat along with Nawab Jabbar Khan, Sultan Muhammad Khan, Pir Muhammad Khan, and Sa'id Muhammad Khan. As Dost Mohammad encroached further towards Qalat and news of this came to Mihrdil, Mihrdil Khan further entrenched himself in defensive positions and prevented entry through the gate of Qalat.

Dost Mohammad set out to flank the citadel and bypass it by setting up camp and placing his artillery on a hill overlooking the city, which could pour artillery fire unto the defenders. As Dost Mohammad marched past the citadel, his forces were harassed by Mihrdil Khan's artillery, leading to heavy casualties. Once Dost Mohammad reached a place out of range from Mihrdil Khan's cannons, he established camp and ordered his men to take positions on the hill. Dost Mohammad then became weary of the Kandahar road to Qalat, in anticipation that Kohandil Khan would march to Qalat and relieve the city from its siege.

When the forces of Kohandil Khan reached Jaldak and made camp. Nawab Jabbar Khan alongside Haidar Khan hoped to make peace with both sides. Kohandil Khan, believing he could not match the strength of Dost Mohammad's armies, drew up peace with Dost Mohammad. Dost Mohammad also accepted a proposal by Haidar Khan to destroy the citadel of Qalat, but later planned to rebuild it when the opportunity came. The following day, the citadel was destroyed. This peace left Qalat as neutral territory between both realms of Kandahar and Kabul.

On 21 July 1855, Kohandil Khan died, sparking a succession crisis and eventually a civil war, which allowed Dost Mohammad to capitalize off of the instability and launch a campaign to conquer the region.

== Conquest ==
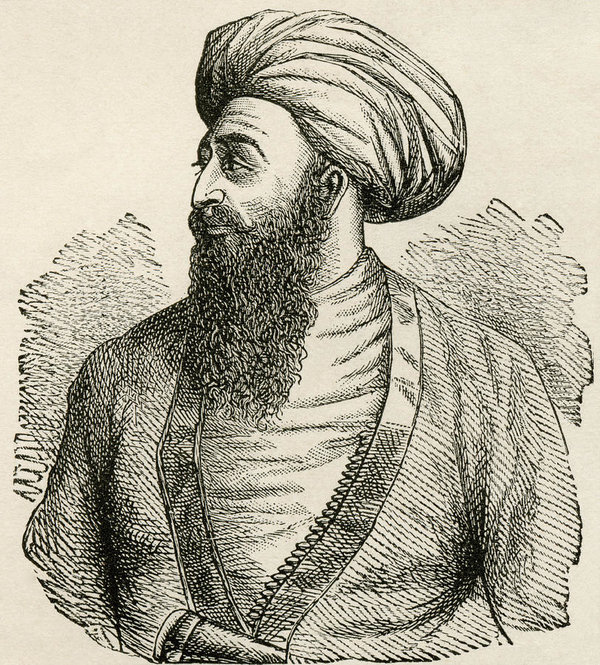
Sketch of Dost Mohammad Khan

Upon news of the crisis in Kandahar, Dost Mohammad ordered Sher Ali to march from Ghazni to Kandahar, which was done. Dost Mohammad departed from Kabul shortly after. During this time, the infighting of Kandahar broke out between the sons of Kohandil Khan and Rahmdil Khan. The Ulama argued that Rahmdil Khan should take over government since he was the oldest family member of the Dil brothers. The sons of Kohandil rejected this and staked claim for themselves. When Sher Ali reached the city, he was greeted by the Kandahar Sardars and was escorted to the English cantonment there. Each day, Sher Ali would conduct business and dispatch himself with 100 men into the city, but returned only with 50, leaving fifty men each time as incognito soldiers. Towards the end of this, Sher Ali successfully brought in over 880 soldiers without the knowledge of anyone.

While Dost Mohammad continued his march to Kandahar, letters from Rahmdil Khan attempted to alleviate him and make him return to Kabul to abandon his march, claiming that the sons of Kohandil Khan had given up their claim. Dost Mohammad did not believe these letters, and even learned from further reports that Rahmdil Khan was incapable of ruling, with anarchy prevailing inside the city.

Dost Mohammad finally reached the city and was greeted by many of the Sardars and on 14 November, called upon the incognito troops that were dispatched into the city, and prepared to enter it. Dost Mohammad claimed to enter the city for the reason to hold a prayer for the death of Kohandil Khan. He thus took control of the citadel. Dost Mohammad took effective control of the city and then divided revenues to the Kandahar Sardars-based on the revenues of Kandahar due to Dost Mohammad not allowing any of the Kandahar Sardars any effective role in the new government he was imposing in Kandahar.

In January 1856, Dost Mohammad's rule in Kandahar became increasingly unstable due to the opposition from many of the Kandahar Sardars. Rahmdil Khan left Kandahar and raided a grain caravan, while Sultan Ali, Khushdil Khan, and Muhammad Umar were established firmly at Mala Khan in Garmser with over 600 men, and attempted a conspiracy against Dost Mohammad, however it failed.

Dost Mohammad began to silence critics by imprisoning religious dignitaries, notably Sahibzada Gudri, Qazi Ghulam, and Akhundzada Azizullah. This only worsened his stability over the domain of Kandahar, as the remaining Ulama of Kandahar voiced negative opinions of Dost Mohammad and even declared Jihad against him.

Dost Mohammad Khan's situation in Kandahar relaxed after Hafiz Ji led successful negotiations with Rahmdil Khan, and managed to induce him alongside all his sons back to loyalty toward Dost Mohammad, and even brought all to return to Kandahar. Alongside this, one of Dost Mohammad Khan's sons, Muhammad Sharif Khan defeated Muhammad Umar, and his companions were brought to Kandahar. Dost Mohammad Khan also convinced Saddiq Khan after he gave up his resistance in Baluchistan and returned to Kandahar in early August. With the open rebellion ended, Dost Mohammad Khan faced other issues such as meeting the expectations of Rahmdil Khan's annual revenues for their loyalty to the regime. During his negotiations with Hafiz Ji, he negotiated for 500,000 rupees in exchange for giving up claim of Kandahar to Haidar Khan, one of his sons. Despite this settlement, the agreed revenues often were reduced, such as to 1,000 Rupees per month, and in 1857, it was increased to 80,000 rupees.

The resistance of the Qandahar Sardars began to spark once again when Dost Mohammad Khan left the city in September 1856, giving the governorship of Kandahar to his son, Haidar Khan. In early October Saddiq Khan took advantage of the Persian siege of Herat to seize the city of Farah from its governor, Khairullah Khan. In a letter sent to Mirakhor Ahmad Khan, Muhammad Saddiq threatened to give the city of Farah to the Persians unless his demands were met. Saddiq Khan demanded that his former Jagir was restored to his governorship, and that aid would be given in rebuilding the fort of Mahmudabad, along with 500 houses that were demolished by Dost Mohammad. Saddiq Khan also demanded an active allowance of 80,000 rupees. Haidar Khan did not take these demands well, and sent Jalal al-Din Khan accompanied by 2,000 cavalry, one infantry regiment, and six guns to Farah. Saddiq Khan raised a force equally as strong, and further reinforced by aid from Herat raised by Muhammad Umar Khan, Sultan Ali, and Muhammad Alam Khan. Muhammad Saddiq also further raised the support of certain Barakzai, Achakzai, Ishaqzai, and Nurzai chiefs. Despite the support, Muhammad Saddiq Khan was defeated by Jalal al-Din on 30 October, four days after the fall of Herat to the Persians. With Saddiq defeated, Farah was reconquered by Haidar Khan.

== Aftermath ==
With the conquest of Kandahar, Dost Mohammad Khan had significantly expanded his realm from the past 15 years from just Kabul and surrounding environs to now include cities like Balkh, and Sheberghan. While with the conquest of Kandahar, Dost Mohammad had advanced his realm as far as Shindand, which would be key in his future conquests.

== See also ==
- Wazir Akbar Khan
- Maimana Khanate
- Timur Shah Durrani
- Expedition of Shuja ul-Mulk
