= Mehr Dil Khan =

Governor in the Durrani Empire (1796–1855)

- مهردل خان
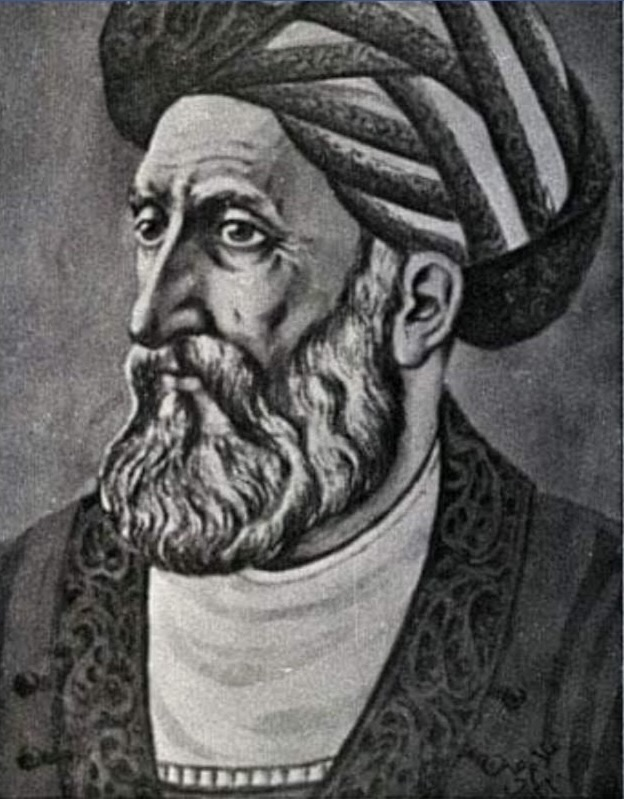
- A portrait of Mehr Dil Khan c. 1855

Governor of the Northern Frontier
- In office 9 August 1826 – 8 May 1839
- Monarch: Kohan Dil Khan
- In office 9 August 1842 – 16 March 1855
- Monarch: Kohan Dil Khan

Foreign Minister of the Durrani Empire
- In office 3 May 1809 – September 1818
- Monarch: Mahmud Shah Durrani
- Prime Minister: Fateh Ali Khan

Personal details
- Born: 1796 Kandahar, Durrani Empire
- Died: 16 March 1855 (aged 58–59) Kandahar, Principality of Kandahar
- Spouse: 6 wives: a Nurzai lady a Barakzai lady a second Barakzai lady an Ishaqzai lady a Popalzai lady a Babar lady
- Children: 10 sons and 3 daughters: Sultan Jan Khush Dil Khan Ali Akbar Khan Ali Asghar Khan Sher Muhammad Khan Mohammad Husain Khan Sher Ali Khan Hajji Munawar Dil Khan Sultan Mohammad Khan Gul Mohammad Khan Murwarid Begum Two unknown daughters
- Parent(s): Payandah Khan; An Idu Khel Hotak lady

Mehr Dil Khan Mohammadzai, (Note: Pashto: مهردل خان, romanized: Mehrdil Xān [meɾ d̪il xɑn, mehɾ d̪il xɑn]; Persian: مهردل خان, romanized: Mehrdil Khān [meːɾ d̪ɪl xɑːn, me̞ɦɾ d̪ɪl xɑːn]) (1796 – 16 March 1855) also known by his pen name as Mashriqi, (Note: Persian: مشرقی, romanized: Mashriqī [mäʃ.ɾɪ.qíː], lit. 'Oriental') was the governor of the Northern Frontier bordering the Ghilji tribes' domains of the Hotak and Tokhi tribes during the reigns of Pur Dil Khan and Kohan Dil Khan until his death in 1855.

== Early life ==
Mehr Dil was born in Kandahar into a Mohammadzai family, to his father Payandah Khan and to an Idu Khel Hotak lady, alongside his full-brothers, also known as the 'Dil Brothers': Sher Dil Khan, Pur Dil Khan, Rahim Dil Khan and Rahim Dil Khan.

== Rise to power ==
Following the overthrow of Shuja Shah Durrani in 1809, Mehr Dil became the foreign minister of the Durrani Empire during the restored reign of Mahmud Shah Durrani, while his brothers were appointed as the governors of different major cities respectively.

The Dil Brothers established their own domain in Kandahar, and later expanded. Mehr Dil was appointed as the governor of the Northern Frontier, following government improvements.

== Descendants ==
Some of his descendants live in Europe and the USA. The spellings of the names vary slightly .
