= Jaldak =

Jaldak may refer to:

- Jaldak, Afghanistan
- Jaldak, Iran
