= Sher Dil Khan =

Sardar of Kandahar (1818–1826)

Sher Dil Khan شېردل خان
- Sardar
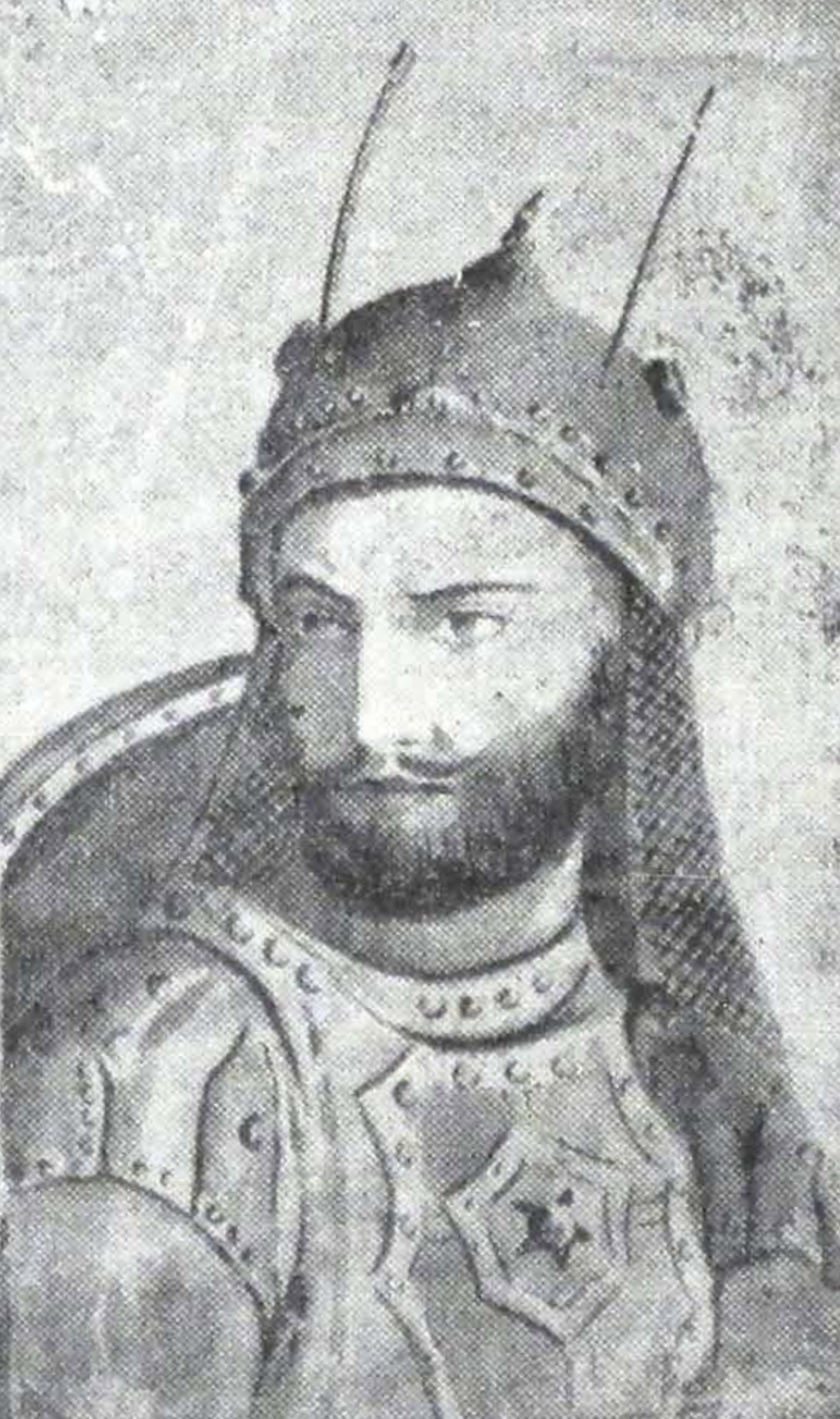
- Portrait of Sher Dil Khan

Sardar of Kandahar
- Reign: September 1818 – 9 August 1826
- Predecessor: Office established (Mahmud Shah Durrani as Shah of the Durrani Empire)
- Successor: Pur Dil Khan
- Born: 1786; Kandahar, Durrani Empire
- Died: 29 July 1826 (aged 39–40); Kandahar, Principality of Kandahar
- Burial: 29 July 1826; Hazrat Ji Baba Shrine, Kandahar, Afghanistan
- Spouse: a Barakzai lady
- Issue: 2 sons: Nur Allah Khan Mir Ahmad Khan
- Dynasty: Barakzai dynasty
- Father: Payandah Khan
- Mother: an Idu Khel Hotak lady
- Military career
- Conflicts: Battle of Kafir Qala; Afghan Civil War (1793–1823)

Sher Dil Khan Barakzai (Note: Pashto: شېردل خان بارکزی, romanized: Šerdil Xān Bārakzai [ʃeɾ.d̪il xɑn bɑ.ɾak.zaɪ]; Persian: شیردل خان بارکزی, romanized: Shērdil Khān Bārakzay [ʃeːɾ.d̪ɪl xɑːn bɑː.ɾäk.záj]) (1786 – 9 August 1826) was the first Sardar and founder of the Principality of Kandahar, who ruled from August 1818 until his death on 29 July 1826.

== Early life ==
Sher Dil was born in Kandahar into a Barakzai Pashtun family, to his father Payandah Khan, and to an Idu Khel Hotak Pashtun mother, alongside his full-brothers, also known as the 'Dil Brothers': Pur Dil Khan, Kohan Dil Khan, Rahim Dil Khan and Mehr Dil Khan.

== Career ==
To avenge Payandah Khan's execution by Zaman Shah Durrani in 1800, Sher Dil's elder uterine brother and head of the Barakzai tribe, Fateh Ali Khan pledged allegiance to Mahmud Shah Durrani during his visit to Persia, and engineered the blinding of Zaman Shah to overthrow him. This united all half-brothers and sons of Payandah Khan to support one another, and to partake in overthrowing Zaman Shah, to which Mahmud Shah was installed to the throne on 25 July 1801.

During the restoration of Mahmud Shah Durrani, Sher Dil was appointed as the Governor of Ghazni, while his brothers were appointed to be governors of different cities.

In the Battle of Kafir Qala, Sher Dil led a coalition consisting of Sistani, Firozkohi and Jamshidi cavalries against the Persian Army on Fateh Ali's right wing.

== Reign ==
After Kamran Mirza Durrani executed Fateh Ali Khan in jealousy, the Barakzai half-brothers united again, in order to avenge his death by deposing Kamran's father, Mahmud Shah Durrani. The Barakzai brothers got their own share of land, whereas the Durranis were deposed to Herat.

In 1818, the Dil brothers seized Kandahar and its surroundings, and declared independence. Sher Dil Khan was in charge of the military in the principality.

During the Herati Civil War, Sher Dil Khan led an army against the Herat under Mahmud Shah Durrani. Initially being successful, Sher Dil returned to Kandahar after hearing of Mohammad Azim Khan's death.

== Death ==
Sher Dil died on 9 August 1826 during an expedition to Sindh.
