= Rahim Dil Khan =

Rahim Dil Khan رحيمدل خان
- Sardar

Sardar of Kandahar
- Reign: 21 August 1855 – September 1856
- Predecessor: Kohan Dil Khan
- Successor: Office abolished (Dost Mohammad Khan as Emir of Afghanistan)
- Born: 1796; Kandahar, Durrani Empire
- Died: 1859 (aged 62–63); Qajar Iran
- Spouse: Hawa Begum
- Issue: 7 sons and 2 daughters: Mohammad Azim Khan Mohammad Alam Khan Hajji Ghulam Mohammad Khan Mohammad Sardar Khan Ghulam Haidar Khan Mohammad Quli Khan Gul Mohammad Khan Taj un-Nisa Begum Unknown daughter
- Dynasty: Barakzai dynasty
- Father: Payandah Khan
- Mother: an Idu Khel Hotak lady

Rahim Dil Khan Barakzai (Note: Pashto: رحيمدل خان بارکزی, romanized: Rahimdil Xān Bārakzai [ra.jim d̪il xɑn bɑ.ɾak.zaɪ, ra.him d̪il xɑn bɑ.ɾak.zaɪ]; Persian: رحیمدل خان بارکزی, romanized: Rahīmdil Khān Bārakzay [rä.jíːm.d̪ɪl xɑːn bɑː.ɾäk.záj, rä.ɦíːm.d̪ɪl xɑːn bɑː.ɾäk.záj]) (1796–1859) was the fourth and last Sardar of the Principality of Kandahar from 1855 until he was overthrown by his Kabul-based half-brother Dost Mohammad Khan in 1856.

== Early life ==
Rahim Dil was born in Kandahar into a Barakzai family, to his father Payandah Khan and to an Idu Khel Hotak lady, alongside his full-brothers, also known as the 'Dil Brothers': Sher Dil Khan, Pur Dil Khan, Kohan Dil Khan and Mehr Dil Khan.

== Reign ==
Rahim Dil succeeded his older brother Kohan Dil Khan in being the Prince of Kandahar, but this quickly backlashed as he got into a succession crisis with Kohan Dil's son Mohammad Sadiq Khan. This paved a way for Dost Mohammad Khan to conquer Kandahar, and put an end to the Principality of Kandahar, forcing Rahim Dil to flee to Iran, where he died in 1859.
