= Zirak =

Tribal confederation in Afghanistan and Pakistan

- Ethnicity: Pashtun
- Location: Afghanistan, Pakistan
- Parent tribe: Durrani
- Language: Pashto
- Religion: Islam

The Zirak (Pashto: زیرک) is a tribal confederation of the Durrani (formerly known as Abdālī) Pashtuns that predominantly reside in Afghanistan and Pakistan.

== Tribes ==
Among the tribes that form a part of the confederation are:

- Alakozai
- Barakzai
- Musazai
- Popalzai
