= Payandah Khan =

Payandah Khan پاينده خان
- Emir of Emirs (Note: Arabic: أمير الأمراء, romanized: Amīr al-Umarāʾ [ʔa.miːr‿ul.ʔu.ma.raːʔ]); The Exalted Khan (Note: Persian: سرفراز خان, romanized: Sarfarāz Khān [säɾ.fä.ɾɑ́ːz xɑːn])
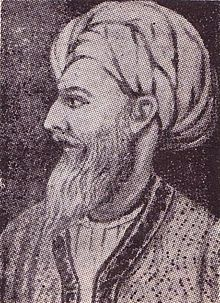
- Portrait of Payandah Khan

Grand Vizier of the Durrani Empire
- Grand Vizier: 1774 – October 1800
- Predecessor: Rahimdad Khan
- Successor: Fath Allah Khan
- Born: 1758; Kandahar, Durrani Empire
- Died: October 1800 (aged 41–42); Kabul, Durrani Empire
- Cause of death: Execution
- Spouse: 10 wives: A Nasrat Khel Mohammadzai lady A Malikdin Zai Barakzai lady A Kohistani lady A second Nasrat Khel Mohammadzai lady A Ghilji lady An Alakozai lady Zainab Begum A Tajik lady A Siyah-posh Kafir lady A Hazara lady
- Issue: 25 sons and 4 daughters: Fath Ali Khan Asad Allah Khan Taimur Quli Khan Abd al-Jabbar Khan Mohammad Azim Khan Abd al-Samad Khan Pur Dil Khan Sher Dil Khan Ata Mohammad Khan Yar Mohammad Khan Dost Mohammad Khan Kohan Dil Khan Amir Mohammad Khan Nawab Turabaz Khan Sultan Mohammad Khan Rahim Dil Khan Mehr Dil Khan Said Mohammad Khan Pir Mohammad Khan Mohammad Zaman Khan Mohammad Zmar Khan Haidar Khan Aslam Khan Juma Khan Khair Allah Khan Wafa Begum Three unknown daughters
Names
- Payandah Khan ibn Hajji Jamal Khan Mohammadzai
- House: Barakzai dynasty
- Father: Hajji Jamal Khan
- Military career
- Conflicts: Rebellion of Azad Khan; Battle of Attock (1793); Afghan Civil War (1793–1823) (executed)

Sardar Payandah Khan Barakzai, (Note: Pashto: پاينده خان بارکزی, romanized: Pāyanda Xān Bārakzai [pɑ.jan.da xɑn bɑ.ɾak.zaɪ]; Persian: پاینده خان بارکزی, romanized: Pāyanda Khān Bārakzay [pʰɑː.jän̪.d̪á xɑːn bɑː.ɾäk.záj]) (1758 – October 1800) also known as Payinda Khan, and by his honorific title as the Exalted Khan, was chief of the Barakzai tribe, as well as a civil servant and the Grand Vizier of the Durrani Empire under the reigns of Timur Shah Durrani and Zaman Shah Durrani from 1774 until his execution in 1800, after being stripped of all his powers.

== Early life ==
Payandah was born as a fourth son in 1758 to Hajji Jamal Khan, a member of the Mohammadzai branch of the Barakzai Pashtun tribe. His father was a former opponent to Ahmad Shah Durrani, and later the chief of the Barakzai tribe, and the Grand Vizier of the Durrani Empire under his reign, as well as under the reign of Timur Shah Durrani until his death in 1772.

== Rise to power ==
The previous head of the Barakzais, Payandah Khan's elder brother Rahimdad Khan, eventually became unpopular among the Barakzais, which led to Timur Shah replacing him with Payandah Khan in 1774, and Payandah Khan was given the title Sarfaraz Khan (The Exalted Khan) ever since.

Payandah Khan helped Zaman Shah Durrani in seizing the Durrani throne, and supported him throughout his campaigns after helping him and his legitimacy of being king.

In December of 1793, Payandah Khan routed the Sikhs at Attock.

== Death and legacy ==
As Zaman Shah Durrani got rid of his enemies in the long run, the Durrani Empire saw a period of prosperity that it had not seen for a while. Fath Allah Khan began suspecting that a plot was formulating on Zaman Shah among Payandah Khan, and Azim Khan Alakozai, the head of the Jawansher Qizilbash, and numerous other prominent chiefs. Zaman Shah was then informed of what had come, where he fabricated witnesses to the event, while Payandah Khan's sons claimed Fath Allah was attempting to bring the fall of the Barakzais.

Nonetheless, Payandah Khan and other conspirators were rounded up and executed, with their heads being displayed publicly in Kandahar. This execution brought dire consequences, such as the alliance between the Sadozais and the Barakzais which was now broken. As a result, Fateh Khan, who was the eldest of Payandah Khan's children, fled to Persia where Mahmud Shah Durrani was in exile, and swore his allegiance to him. This eventually led to Mahmud Shah replacing Zaman Shah after Fateh Khan engineered the blinding of Zaman Shah.

== Wives and children ==
Payandah Khan had a large household and contracted marriages with women from several prominent Afghan tribal and military communities. These marriages reflected the political logic of the Durrani aristocracy, in which marital alliances helped connect tribal, military and courtly networks. He had at least twenty-one sons, several of whom became major political and military figures after his death.

The maternal groupings of Payandah Khan's sons later became politically significant. Full brothers often acted together as factions, while different groups of half-brothers became associated with separate regional centres, especially Kabul, Kandahar and Peshawar.

=== Sons ===
The following list gives Payandah Khan's sons according to their maternal grouping, as preserved in dynastic and historical accounts. Some dates remain approximate or uncertain.

- By a Mohammadzai wife:
  - Wazir Fateh Khan Barakzai (1778–1818), his eldest son and later vizier.
- By a lady of the Nusrat Khel clan:
  - Sardar Timur Quli Khan (1780–1822).
  - Sardar Mohammad Azim Khan (1785–1823), later governor of Kashmir.
- By a Barakzai wife:
  - Nawab Asadullah Khan (born 1778).
  - Nawab Abd al-Samad Khan (1785–1828).
  - Sardar Tura Baz Khan (born 1795).
- By a Kohistani or Hazara consort:
  - Nawab Abd al-Jabbar Khan (1782–1854).
- By an Idu Khel Hotak Ghilji wife; these full brothers later became associated with the Kandahar branch:
  - Sardar Pur Dil Khan (1785–1830).
  - Sardar Sher Dil Khan (1786–1826).
  - Sardar Kohan Dil Khan (1793–1855).
  - Sardar Rahim Dil Khan (1796–1859).
  - Sardar Mehr Dil Khan (1797–1855).
- By an Alakozai wife; these full brothers later became associated with the Peshawar branch:
  - Sardar Ata Muhammad Khan (1786–1824).
  - Sardar Yar Muhammad Khan (1790–1828).
  - Sultan Mohammad Khan Telai (1795–1861), ancestor of the later Musahiban royal line.
  - Sardar Said Mohammad Khan (1797–1860).
  - Sardar Pir Muhammad Khan (1800–1871).
- By Zainab, a Jawansher Qizilbash wife; these sons later became associated with the Kabul branch:
  - Amir Dost Mohammad Khan (1792–1863), founder and first emir of the Barakzai dynasty.
  - Sardar Amir Muhammad Khan (1794–1834).
- By other consorts, described in some accounts as Farsi or otherwise unidentified:
  - Sardar Juma Khan (c. 1800–1871).
  - Sardar Islam Khan, who died at the age of twelve.

=== Daughters ===
Payandah Khan had at least four daughters. One of the most historically prominent was a full sister of Dost Mohammad Khan by Zainab, the Qizilbash wife, and the mother of Madad Khan. Noelle states that she was active in the political and military arena on behalf of Dost Mohammad Khan during the First Anglo-Afghan War.
