= Zaman Shah Durrani =

Third Durrani emperor (r. 1793–1801)

Zaman Shah Durrani زمان شاہ درانی
- King, Pearl of Pearls (Note: Persian: شاه در دران, romanized: Šāh Durr-i Durrān)
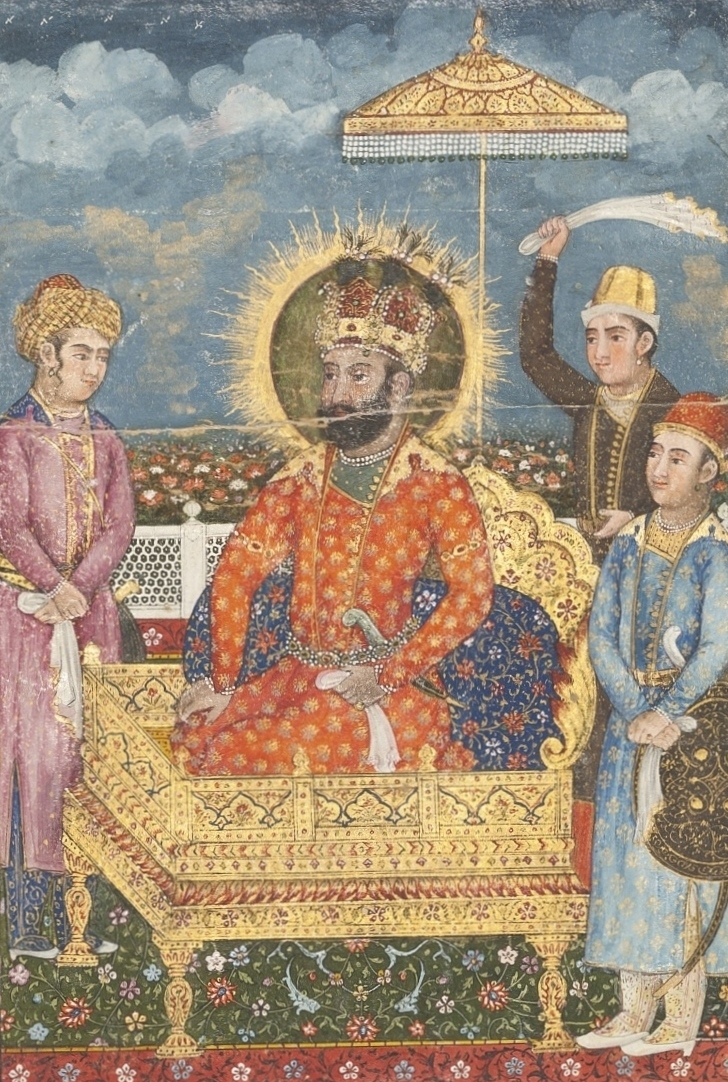
- Miniature depicting the coronation of Zaman Shah, c. 1790s

Shah of the Durrani Empire
- Reign: 20 May 1793 – 25 July 1801
- Coronation: 1793
- Predecessor: Timur Shah Durrani
- Successor: Mahmud Shah Durrani
- Born: 1767; Durrani Empire
- Died: 13 September 1845 (aged 77–78); Ludhiana, Sikh Empire (Present day India)
- Burial: Rauza Sharif, Sirhind, Punjab, India
- Issue: Qaisar Shah
Names
- Shah Zaman Abdali Dur-e-Durran
- Dynasty: Durrani
- Father: Timur Shah Durrani
- Mother: Maryam Begum
- Religion: Islam
- Military career
- Conflicts: Afghan–Sikh Wars; Battle of Rohtas (1795); Afghan Civil War (1793–1823); First Anglo-Afghan War

Zaman Shah Durrani (Note: Pashto: زمان شاه دراني, romanized: Zamān Šāh Durrāni [zä.mɑn ʃɑ(h) d̪u(ɾ).ɾɑ.ni]; Persian: زمان شاه درانی, romanized: Zamān Shāh Durrānī [zä.mɑ́ːn ʃɑː(ʱ) d̪ʊɾ.ɾɑː.níː]) (1767 – 13 September 1845) was the third King of the Durrani Empire from 1793 until 1801. An ethnic Pashtun of the Sadozai clan, Zaman Shah was the grandson of Ahmad Shah Durrani and the fifth son of Timur Shah Durrani.

== Early years ==
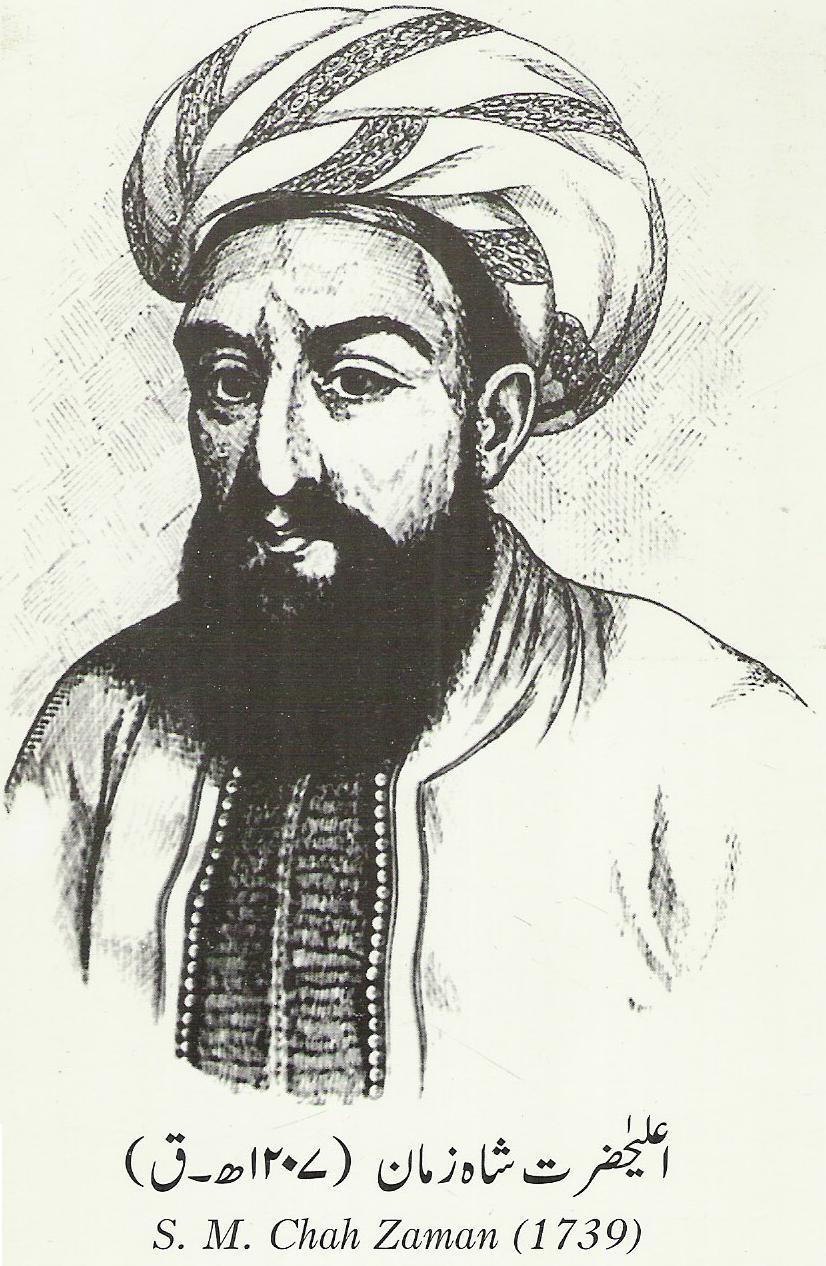
Imaginary depiction of Zaman Shah

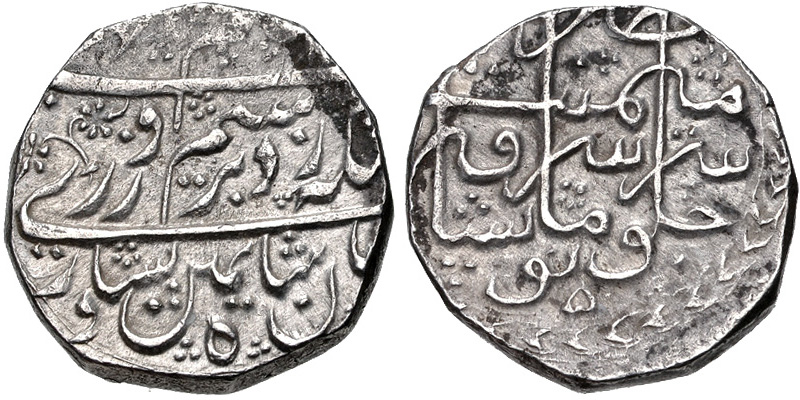
Silver rupee of Zaman Shah Durrani, struck at the Peshawar mint, dated 1797

Zaman Shah was born to Timur Shah Durrani. The year of his birth is disputed however. Fayz Muhammad gives 1767 as his year of birth, while Noelle-Karimi gives the year as 1770. Zaman Shah had always wanted to follow his father, Timur Shah Durrani with his conquests in Punjab, however Timur Shah Durrani did not allow it, and Zaman Shah very early grew interests of being like his grandfather, Ahmad Shah Durrani, as a child he had dreamt of conquering Hindustan, but his father did not allow Zaman Shah to accompany him on his campaigns. Zaman Shah Durrani took the Durrani throne in 1793 after his father's death.

== Reign ==
=== Opposition ===
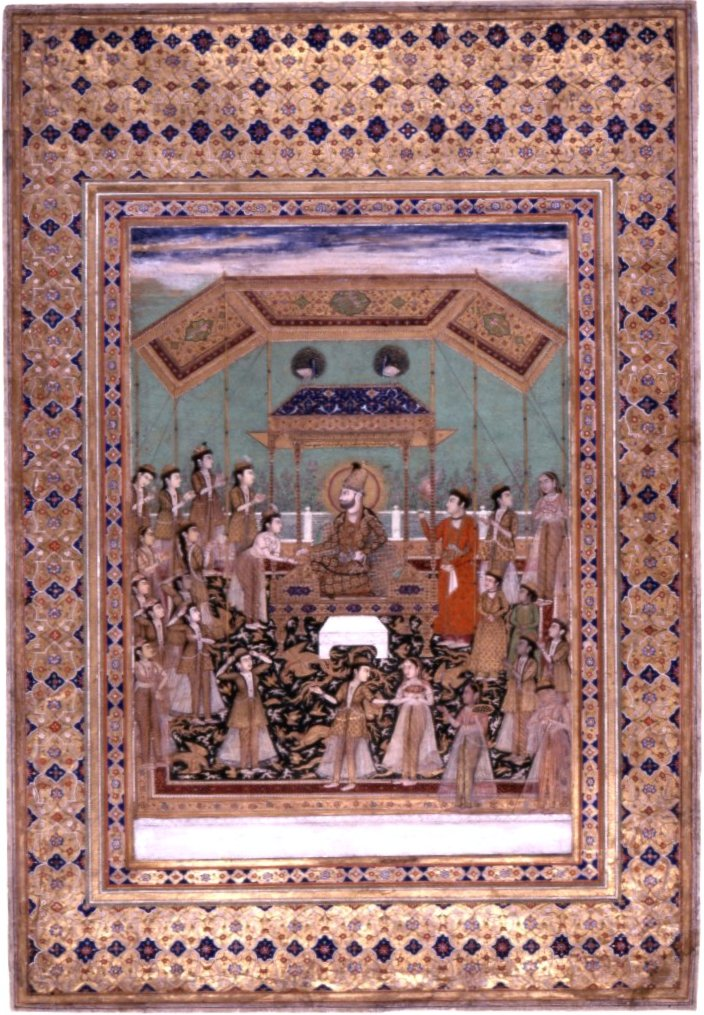
Zaman Shah in Durbar, c. 1799

When Zaman had taken the throne, he was opposed by many of his brothers, among whom were Mahmud Shah Durrani and Humayun who had their respective regional zones of influence. To deal with these claims over succession, an election was held in Kabul over who the next Durrani ruler would be. Abbas Mirza was a running candidate and would have taken the vote if the election was held right after Timur Shah Durrani's death. However with the given time, Barakzai tribal leaders and Zaman's influence had by then grew, allowing him to receive the popular vote and become the ruler, specifically supported by Chief Payandah Khan.

=== Securing the throne ===
Having now been declared King of the Durrani Empire and recognized by all but his brothers, he led his brothers to Kabul, where he imprisoned his opposing brothers. He implicated a diet to starve his brothers, with a diet of two to three ounces of bread each day, with the effect, the brothers gave in on the sixth day, where they had given in and recognized Zaman Shah as the King of the Durrani Empire. The Princes were then freed but kept under surveillance in the Bala Hissar, Kabul.

=== Reforms ===
Zaman Shah had wanted a ministry and cabinet that would be loyal to him and of his people, as a result he had replaced his old ministry and replaced them with loyal Pashtuns devoted to Zaman Shah, strengthening his position on the throne. Zaman Shah had also led hard campaigns to tie himself to the chiefs who had opposed him in the Kabul election, where in most cases he succeeded, bringing more strength to his rule and throne, to those who did oppose him still as the chiefs, he put them to death.

=== March on Kandahar against Humayun ===
Zaman Shah, wanting to further secure his throne from the growing popularity of Mahmud Shah in Herat and older brother Humayun in Kandahar wanted to mobilise his army to march on Kandahar to prevent them uniting against his rule. Humayun, disregarded the advice to stay in defense within Kandahar's great walls and wait for Mahmud Shah reinforcements to arrive from Herat, and marched out to meet Zaman Shah's army and was defeated at Qalati Ghilji and forced to flee to Baluchistan. With his victory, Zaman Shah, secured Kandahar.

Before being able to move against Mahmud Shah in Herat, he had received news of possible rebellion on the outer provinces of the empire, and that his presence was urgently required in Kabul. He signed a truce with Mahmud Shah and returned to Kabul as a result.

=== Return to Kabul ===
Having then recaptured Kandahar and being recalled, he had led a reign of terror, seeing his father, Timur Shah Durrani's implicated systems as too lenient, every person correlating to any influence within the Durrani Empire was watched upon. Zaman Shah also ordered the execution of anybody who opposed him, often leading to massacres within the city to rout out small groups of resistance and opposition. The same Barakzai tribal leaders, who had led Zaman Shah in effort to consolidate his holdings and capture the throne were deprived of all power, with other chiefs also being arrested, or put to death. The outerlying provinces of the empire, having heard of the news in the capital had led prolific revolts in return, not wanting to meet the same fate as many of the nobles in Kabul; revolts broke out in Kashmir and Punjab; and Sindh had severed itself of influence and correlation to the Durrani Empire; and the Uzbeks had crossed the Oxus.

=== Second march to Kandahar and Sindh ===
Zaman Shah, now seeing his realm disintegrating, had marched to Peshawar, where he heard the news of his brother, Humayun, with the assistance of the Talpur in Sindh had seized Kandahar. He turned from Peshawar to meet him at Kandahar. Humayun was betrayed by the Afghans in Kandahar, forcing him to flee again, this time to Sindh, but then attempted to escape to Herat in the domain of his brother Mahmud Shah. Humayun was captured with a detachment of horses and ordered by Zaman Shah to be put to death, making sure Kandahar wouldn't be under threat from him once again.

Zaman Shah, having been forced to turn his expedition because of the Talpur had marched on Sindh, enraged and with the ideal of reintegrating the province into the Durrani Empire ever since it started to drift off from his father, Timur Shah Durrani's reign. When Zaman Shah entered Sindh, he heard the news of his brother, Mahmud Shah had been marching on Kandahar to cut him off from Afghanistan. Zaman Shah had then spared the Talpur but put under the conditions that they would tribute to the Durrani Empire once again, and confirmed the Talpur chief, Fath Ali Khan. With the Talpur's dealt with, he returned to Kandahar to deal with his brother Mahmud Shah.

=== Battle with Mahmud Shah ===
Zaman Shah, after dealing with the Talpur, had marched back to Kandahar to prevent Mahmud Shah from seizing the city. Mahmud Shah, having heard the news of his brother returning, took up a position in the Siah-band range and remained there until he heard further news of Zaman Shah's movements. Mahmud Shah had heard his brother was but three marches away from him after leaving Kandahar, and as a result he broke up his armies and moved to the plains, meeting Zaman Shah's army at Gurak Village. The two armies fought, with the fight initially appearing to be a close victory for Mahmud Shah. However, his men finally gave way, leading to a decisive victory for Zaman Shah. Following the battle, Mahmud Shah first fled to Farah, Afghanistan, then moved to Herat, where, by inciting the Uzbeks to attack, he persuaded Zaman Shah to pardon him, allowing Mahmud Shah to continue his affairs in government.

=== Dealing with revolts and march to Punjab ===
Zaman Shah was forced to withdraw and prepare an army to invade Khorasan. However, due to Agha Mohammad Khan Qajar's assassination on 17 June 1797, one of Nader's grandsons had resumed control and declared his independence.

== Later Reign ==
=== Second and Third march to Punjab ===
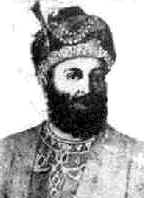
Drawing of Mahmud Shah Durrani

With the Khorasan Province situation having blown over, Zaman Shah had returned to Peshawar to invade Punjab again, he advanced as far as Lahore and had planned to further invade into India. Zaman Shah had then heard the news that Mahmud Shah was in revolt and was planning to march on Kandahar once again. Zaman Shah, annoyed, and having enough of these constant issues had brought over one of Mahmud Shah's chief generals, occupied Herat, and forced him to flee to Persia.

Having now dealt with Mahmud Shah, Zaman Shah had resumed his plans for invading Punjab and India, he led his armies to Peshawar and had advanced as far as Lahore once again, before he was recalled by his intelligence, that the Persians, under Fath-Ali Shah Qajar, were threatening Khorasan Province once again, this had forced Zaman Shah to withdraw to Peshawar and then Herat. The action that had prompted the Qajars to threaten the Durranis was provocated by the British East India Company, where the East India company had heard of Zaman Shah's attempts to repeat his grandfather's success in Hindustan. However, despite the Persian invasion, its attempted were foiled as Fath-Ali Shah Qajar had advanced as far as Sabzwar, and then withdrew. Though the invasion had failed, it had distracted Zaman Shah and forced him to hole in Kandahar for the winter. According to historian Hari Gupta, Zaman Shah's costly failed campaigns against the Sikhs, specifically failure to reach Delhi, led him to lose his crown as well as his eyes.

=== Mahmud Shah's return to Herat ===
Mahmud Shah, having seen Zaman Shah distracted, had mobilized a force of over 10,000 men from the outer lying provinces of Persia, he had then led these forces to Herat, where Zaman Shah, having heard of the news had also led his armies to march to Herat. However, Mahmud Shah's allies had seen how he failed against Zaman Shah before, as a result they had little confidence and low morale for the circumstances he was facing. Zaman Shah, seeing this had capitalized on this by creating doubts and fights in Mahmud Shah's camp. With this, Zaman Shah had broken Mahmud Shah's morale and his allies belief to fight, as a result, Mahmud Shah had then fled to Khiva, and then the court of Fath-Ali Shah Qajar, where he led a petition to depose his brother, Zaman Shah. Mahmud Shah had attempted to seek help from Persia to invade the Durrani Empire to topple Zaman Shah's regime, however, nobody sought to help him. As a result, Mahmud Shah, retired to the mountains of Persia.

=== Conspiracy and deposition of Zaman Shah ===
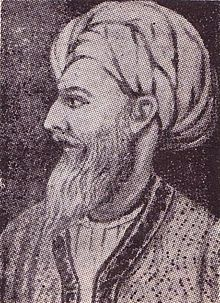
Zaman seized the Durrani throne with the help of Payandah Khan Barakzai

With Zaman Shah at his zenith of power, he ushered through an era of prosperity not seen for a while within the Durrani Empire, however all was not good, with the Barakzai chiefs then planning to topple Zaman Shah, they had laid the constituent articles that Zaman Shah should be overthrown and replaced by his brother, Sujah Mirza, the Durrani crown should be elective, with the chiefs voting in for these. And that the kings who have been proven unworthy can be deposed by the chiefs.

Despite setting their main framework of ideals and plans, Zaman Shah's prime minister, Wafadar Khan, had found out about this, and invited the Barakzai chiefs separately to the palace, where he had executed them. One of his victims was Payandah Khan, one of the same chiefs that helped Zaman Shah to the Durrani throne. However it did not stop there, with Wafadar Khan then ordering the complete capture of all Mohammadzai and Barakzai chiefs. Prominent of this was Fathi Khan, the son of Payandah Khan. Fathi Khan had fled to Khorasan Province, where he met Mahmud Shah Durrani. Mahmud Shah had given up on his attempts of capturing the Durrani throne, however, after hearing news of what happened, Mahmud Shah had agreed, where they had marched to Farah with 18 supporters. Mahmud Shah had led fiery speeches and rallies against Zaman Shah, talking about his oppressive government and the tyrannies of Zaman Shah and Wafadar Khan. He had announced his intention to become the Durrani king and march on Kabul with their support. With this, the Barakzais had risen and flocked to his support, with many of the Durrani doing the same, with his support now large, Mahmud Shah had marched on Kandahar.

Mahmud Shah had begun sieging the city, for 42 days the city garrison held fierce, however, on the 43rd day, Fathi Khan had managed to gain the support of two tribal chiefs in Kandahar. With insurrection now fighting in the city and Mahmud Shah closing in, Kandahar fell to Mahmud Shah's forces. Zaman Shah, unaware of the events at Kandahar, had been focused on the King of Persia's movements, or what the Barakzais might do next in Kabul had then faced the reality of the situation. Instead of sending a force against his rebel brother, he left most of his forces with Shah Shujah Durrani at Peshawar. Zaman Shah, sensing his weakened position in Kabul had retreated in form to Jalalabad and had attempted to raise a large army, he failed to do this and only rallied around 400 artillerymen, and 200 cavalrymen. He marched to a fort not far from the Lataband Pass, where he appealed to the Afghans and tried to rally more support. Zaman Shah had succeeded in doing so, with many partisan fighters also flocking to his support such as Ahmad Khan. With this, his force numbered around 30,000. With Zaman Shah now ready, he marched ahead to meet Mahmud Shah once again in battle. The two armies met near Zabul. Ahmad Khan, leading the advance of Zaman Shah's army had flocked and deserted to Mahmud Shah's army. Zaman Shah, recognizing his situation had fled to a fort near again the Lataband Pass. Zaman Shah had also heard the news that Mahmud Shah had then captured Kabul. Mahmud Shah Durrani had led efforts to imprison Zaman Shah, with Zaman Shah leading a messenger to Mahmud Shah. The next day, Zaman Shah found out that he would be prisoner to Mahmud Shah, after conflicting with himself, he resigned to his fate, hiding his jewels including the Koh-i-Noor diamond, he was then led by a guard to Kabul. He had then met Asad Khan, a surgeon, where he was ordered to blind Zaman Shah from orders of Mahmud Shah. With Zaman Shah being defeated, Mahmud Durrani had now started his first reign on the Durrani throne.

Zaman Shah escaped out of Kabul and took refuge at Rawalpindi where he was met by Ranjit Singh who gave him a house to stay in but later due to his safety concerns, Ranjit Singh welcomed him to stay in Lahore, with a monthly allowance of 1,500 rupees. Later, from Lahore, Zaman Shah moved to Ludhiana where he lived for the rest of his life.

== Death and legacy ==
Zaman Shah died at Ludhiana on 13 September 1845. He is buried at the Ahmad al-Fārūqī al-Sirhindī Mazar in Sirhind, Punjab (India).

== Gallery ==
Zaman Shah
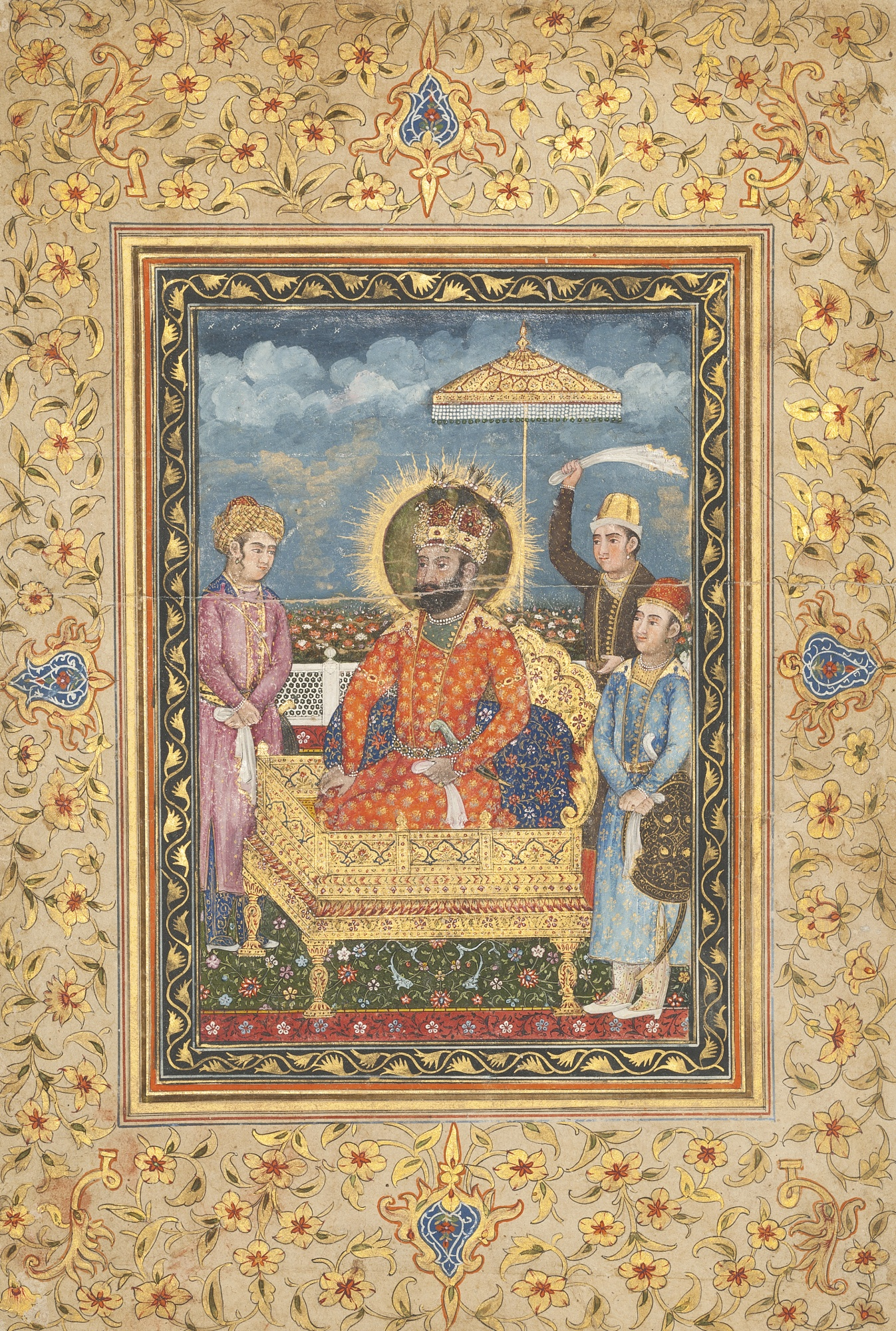
Zaman Shah Enthroned

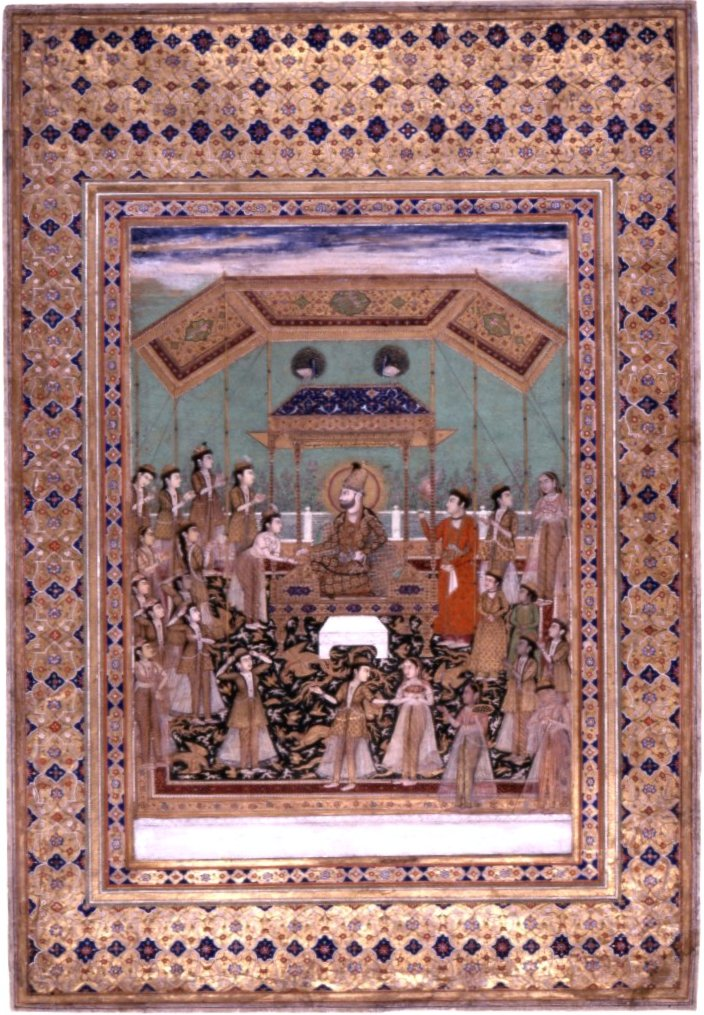
Zaman Shah attending Durbar

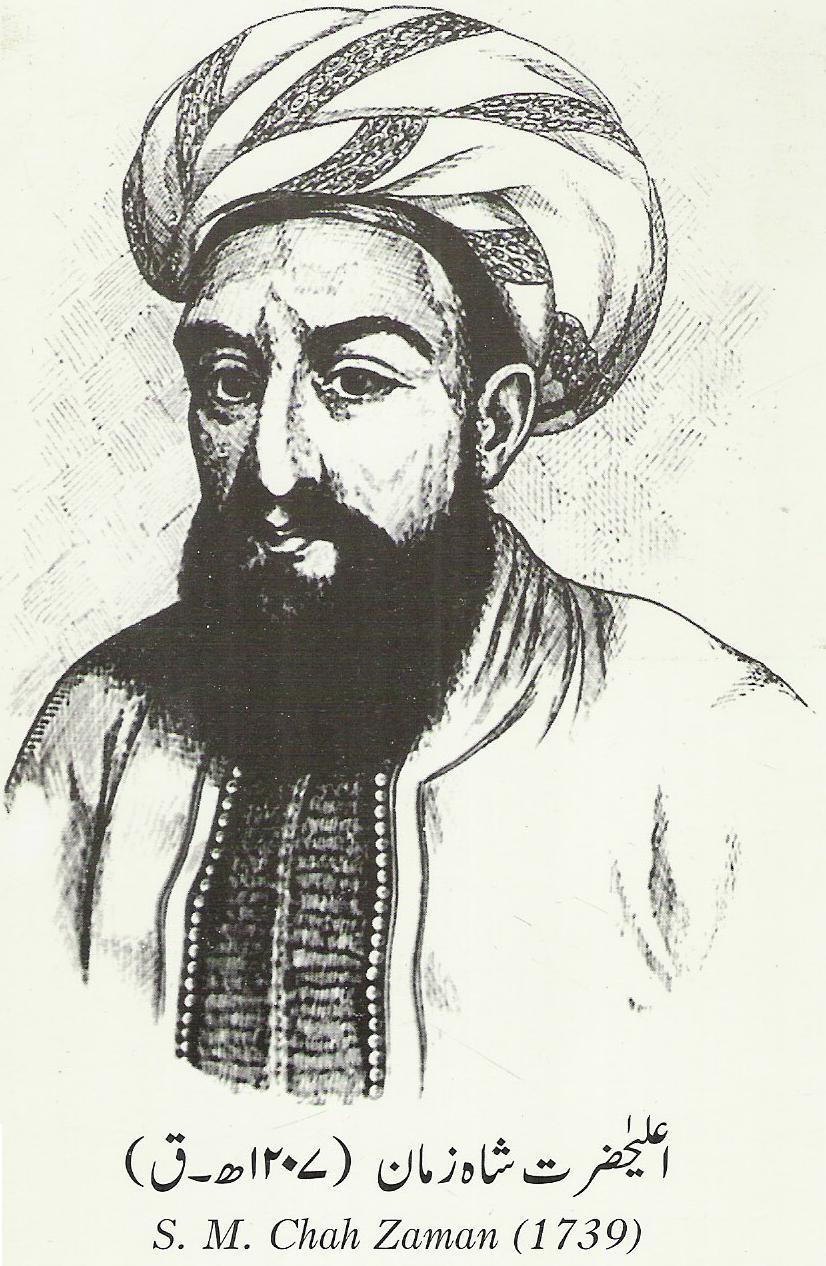
Sketch

== Notes ==
Regnal titles
Preceded by Timur Shah Durrani	Emir of Afghanistan; 18 May 1793 – 25 July 1801	Succeeded by Mahmud Shah Durrani
