= Jaldak, Afghanistan =

Village in Afghanistan

Coordinates: 31°55′32″N 66°31′13″E

Jaldak (Pashto: جلداک) is a village in the Tarnak Aw Jaldak District, Zabul Province, Afghanistan. Jaldak is at an altitude of 1,395 m (4,577 ft), and is northwest of Kandahar.
