= Kohan Dil Khan =

Kohan Dil Khan کهندل خان
- Sardar
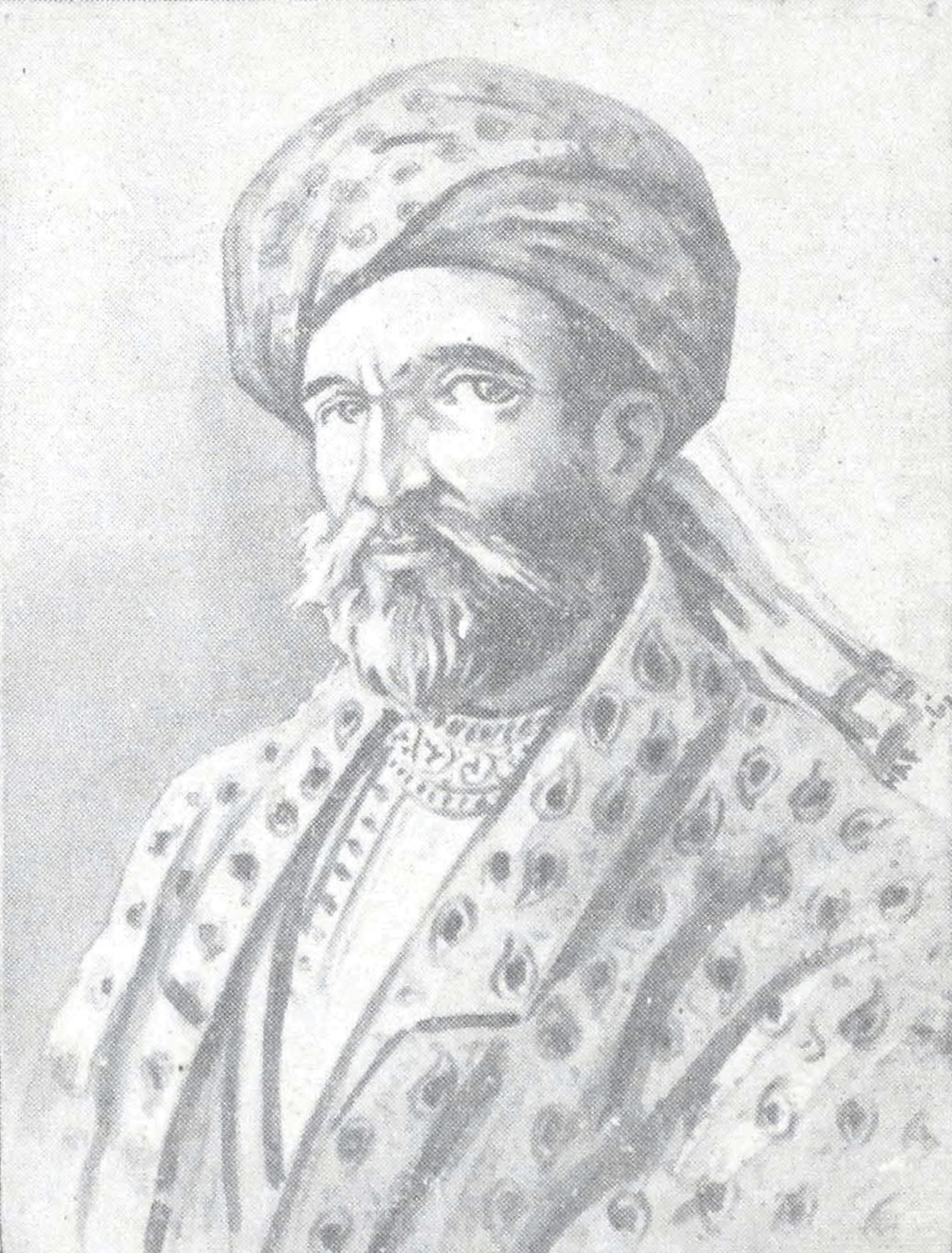
- Miniature portrait of Kohan Dil Khan c. 1830–1855

Sardar of Kandahar
- 1st reign: 22 June 1830 – 8 May 1839
- Predecessor: Pur Dil Khan
- Successor: Office abolished (Shuja Shah Durrani as Shah of the Durrani Empire)
- 2nd reign: 9 August 1842 – 21 August 1855
- Predecessor: Office re-established (Fateh Jang Durrani as Shah of the Durrani Empire)
- Successor: Rahim Dil Khan (Note: Disputed with Mohammad Sadiq Khan)
- Born: 1792; Kandahar, Durrani Empire
- Died: 21 August 1855 (aged 62–63); Herat, Emirate of Herat
- Burial: Great Mosque of Herat, Herat, Afghanistan
- Spouse: 3 wives: an Alakozai lady a daughter of Saidullah Khan Popalzai a Qizilbash lady
- Issue: 6 sons: Mohammad Umar Khan Mohammad Sadiq Khan Mohammad Usman Khan Ghulam Muhi ud-Din Khan Sutlan Ali Khan Abdullah Khan
- Dynasty: Barakzai dynasty
- Father: Payandah Khan
- Mother: an Idu Khel Hotak lady

Kohan Dil Khan Barakzai (Note: Pashto: کهندل خان بارکزی, romanized: Kuhandil Xān Bārakzai [ku.wan d̪il xɑn bɑ.ɾak.zaɪ, ku.han d̪il xɑn bɑ.ɾak.zaɪ]; Persian: کهندل خان بارکزی, romanized: Kuhandil Khān Bārakzay [kʰʊ.wán.d̪ɪl xɑːn bɑː.ɾäk.záj, kʰʊ.ɦán.d̪ɪl xɑːn bɑː.ɾäk.záj]) (1792 – 21 August 1855) was the third Sardar of the Principality of Kandahar who ruled from 1830 to his death in 1855. His rule sparked a succession crisis between his brother Rahim Dil Khan and his son Siddiq Khan, to which state of chaos and anarchy gave a strategic advantage to Dost Mohammad Khan, a half-brother of the Dil Brothers who reigned in Kabul, where he conquered Kandahar in 1855.

== Early life ==
Kohan was born into a Barakzai family, to his father Payandah Khan and to an Idu Khel Hotak lady, alongside his full-brothers, also known as the 'Dil Brothers': Sher Dil Khan, Pur Dil Khan, Rahim Dil Khan and Mehr Dil Khan.

== Reign ==
In 1852, Kohan was disturbed by the punishment of the Tokhi and Hotak tribes of Qalat by Dost Mohammad Khan. Kohandil Khan was worried that this would see the rise of greater influence from Dost Mohammad in the region and possibly stake claim to Kandahar and intervene in the region, ultimately to conquer it and unite the two Barakzai realms. Due to this, Kohandil Khan deployed his younger brother, Mihr Dil Khan, with 4,000 men toward Qalat. Kohan also dispatched several field pieces to fortify the Qalat citadel so that if Dost Mohammad ever attempted to seize Qalat, the citadel could hold out, thus challenging Dost Mohammad. Upon hearing this, Dost Mohammad dispatched Sher Ali Khan from Ghazni to Qalat, also sending Sardar Haidar Khan from Kabul with an army. The two brothers united armies while marching on Kandahar. The forces of Haidar Khan and Sher Ali reached Qalat, and Haidar Khan's cavalrymen rode up to the walls, but were driven off by cannon fire by forces under Mihrdil Khan. Haidar Khan relayed news of what occurred to Dost Mohammad. Dost Mohammad placed Sardar Mohammad Azam Khan as Regent in Kabul, and marched for Qalat along with Nawab Jabbar Khan, Sultan Mohammad Khan, Pir Mohammad Khan, and Sa'id Mohammad Khan. As Dost Mohammad encroached further towards Qalat and news of this came to Mihr Dil Khan, Mihr further entrenched himself in defensive positions and prevented entry through the gate of Qalat.
