= Principality of Kandahar =

Former state in Central Asia

Principality of Kandahar سرداری قندهار
- 1818–1856
- Flag (1818–1856)

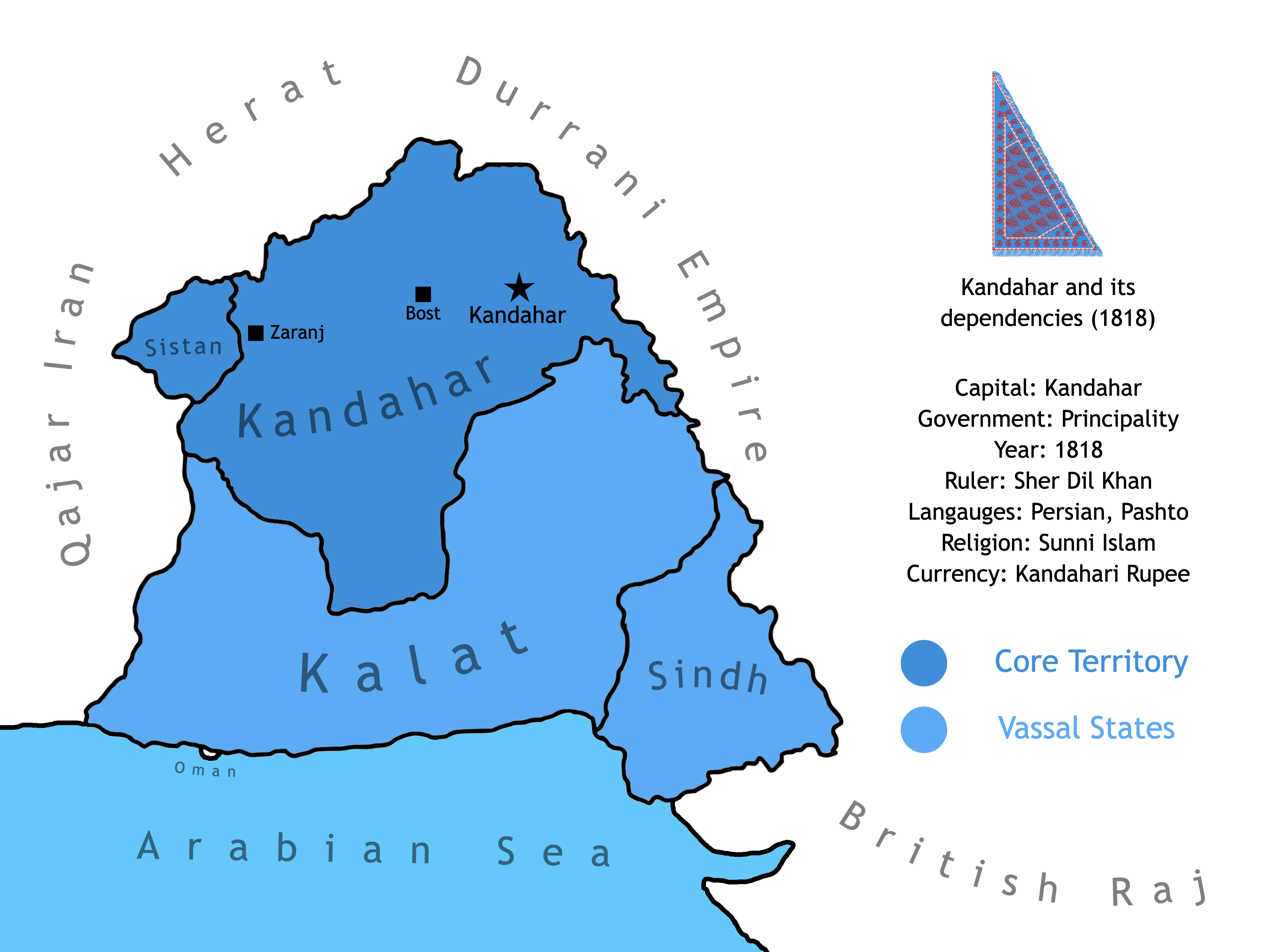
- Kandahar at its greatest extent (c. 1818)
- Capital: Kandahar
- Official languages: Persian; Pashto (Note: Dynastic)
- Ethnic groups: Pashtuns; Farsiwans; Tajiks; Qizilbash; Hazaras; Baloch
- Religion: Sunni Islam (official); Shia Islam
- Demonyms: Kandahari (Persian); Kandaharai/Kandaharəi (Pashto)
- Government: Principality
  - 1818–1826 (first): Sher Dil Khan
  - 1855–1856 (last): Rahim Dil Khan (Note: Disputed with Mohammad Sadiq Khan)
- History
  - Principality established by Sher Dil Khan: August 1818
  - Fall of Kandahar: 8 May 1839
  - Liberation of Kandahar: 9 August 1842
  - Conquest of Kandahar: September 1856
Preceded by
1818: Durrani Empire
1842: Durrani Empire (Shah Shuja)
Succeeded by
1826: Khanate of Kalat
1826: Sindh State
1839: Durrani Empire (Shah Shuja)
1856: Emirate of Afghanistan
- Today part of: Afghanistan; Iran; Pakistan

The Principality of Kandahar, (Note: Persian: سرداری قندهار, romanized: Sardārī-yi Qandahār [säɾ.d̪ɑː.ɾíː.jɪ qän̪.d̪ɑːɑ́ːɾ/qän̪.d̪ä.ɦɑ́ːɾ]) was a principality based in Kandahar and its surroundings from 1818 to 1856. Founded by Sher Dil Khan in August 1818 as a breakaway from the Durrani Empire, it was ruled by the Dil brothers, members of the Barakzai dynasty. In September 1856, the principality was conquered by the Kabul-based half-brother of the Kandahari Dil brothers, Dost Mohammad Khan.

== History ==
In August 1818, the Dil brothers led by Sher Dil Khan seized Kandahar and its surroundings and declared independence. Sher Dil Khan was in charge of the military in the principality. The rule of the four brothers was very unpopular. Sher Dil Khan was supposed to be in charge of Kandahar's walls but after his death in 1826, the brothers fought each other and allowed the city's walls to fall into decay.

In 1842, the Dil Brothers Kohan Dil Khan, Mehr Dil Khan, and Rahim Dil Khan left their exile in Kerman and set out towards Kandahar. They occupied Kandahar and re-established the principality. In the aftermath of the First Anglo-Afghan War, Kohan Dil Khan aimed to expand his influence into Sistan, which had fractured into a number of tribal fiefdoms. As part of this move, Kohan Dil Khan expanded his sphere of influence up to the district of Rudbar, controlled by the Sanjarani Baloch. Herat under Yar Mohammad Khan Alakozai also claimed Sistan as part of his domain, and this would cause clashes between both powers.

In 1855, the death of Kohan Dil Khan sparked a succession crisis between Rahim Dil Khan, and the sons of Kohan Dil led by Mohammad Sadiq Khan. Dost Mohammad Khan capitalized off of this period of anarchy and conquered the principality in September 1856.

The principality was infamous for its brutal judicial punishments and methods of execution, such as being blown from a cannon, being buried alive under a collapsing wall, being forced to consume human waste prior to decapitation, and most commonly flaying.

== Territory and subdivisions ==
The territory of the principality seems to have been split among the various brothers. At the time of Charles Masson's visit to Kandahar, the division of the principality seems to have been as follows:

- Pur Dil Khan as Prince of Kandahar (Kandahar and its surroundings)
- Kohan Dil Khan as Governor of the Western Frontier (Garmsir, Zamindawar, Deh Rawood, Uruzgan; near Herat)
- Mehr Dil Khan as Governor of the Northern Frontier (Near the domains of the Tokhi and Hotak tribes)
- Rahim Dil Khan as Governor of the Eastern Frontier (Sibi, Pishin, and Shorawak)

Sindh and Balochistan paid tribute and were dependent on the principality, being subject to their suzerainty, but were able to break away in August 1826 following the death of Sher Dil Khan.

== List of princes ==
=== 1818–1839 ===
Name	Lifespan	Reign start	Reign end	Notes	Family	Image
Sher Dil Khan	1786 – 9 August 1826	August 1818	9 August 1826	Established the Principality of Kandahar in August 1818, as a breakaway from the Durrani Empire ruled by Mahmud Shah Durrani	Barakzai	
Pur Dil Khan	1785 – 22 June 1830	9 August 1826	22 June 1830	Succeeded the death of his younger brother Sher Dil Khan	Barakzai	
Kohan Dil Khan	1792 – 21 August 1855	22 June 1830	8 May 1839	Succeeded the death of his elder brother Kohan Pur Dil Khan	Barakzai	

=== 1842–1856 ===
Name	Lifespan	Reign start	Reign end	Notes	Family	Image
Kohan Dil Khan	1792 – 21 August 1855	9 August 1842	21 August 1855	Re-established the Principality of Kandahar following the deposition of Durranis and British soldiers from Kandahar	Barakzai	
Rahim Dil Khan	1796 – 1859	21 August 1855	September 1856	Succeeded the death of his elder brother Kohan Dil Khan which sparked a succession crisis between him and Kohan Dil's son Mohammad Sadiq Khan, later overthrown by Dost Mohammad Khan of Kabul in the Conquest of Kandahar	Barakzai	
