= Pur Dil Khan =

Pur Dil Khan پردل خان
- Sardar
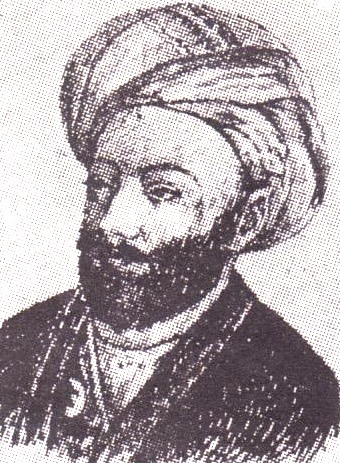
- Miniature portrait of Pur Dil Khan c. 1826–1830

Sardar of Kandahar
- Reign: 9 August 1826 – 22 June 1830
- Predecessor: Sher Dil Khan
- Successor: Kohan Dil Khan
- Born: 1785; Kandahar, Durrani Empire
- Died: 22 June 1830 (aged 44–45); Kandahar, Principality of Kandahar
- Spouse: 2 wives: a Barakzai lady a Ghilji lady
- Issue: 8 sons: Sultan Mohammad Khan Abdul Rasul Khan Mir Afzal Khan Abdullah Khan Khush Dil Khan Maqsood Khan
- Dynasty: Barakzai dynasty
- Father: Payandah Khan
- Mother: an Idu Khel Hotak lady

Pur Dil Khan Barakzai (Note: Pashto: پردل خان, romanized: Purdil Xān Bārakzai [puɾ.d̪il xɑn bɑ.ɾak.zaɪ]; Persian: پردل خان, romanized: Purdil Khān Bārakzay [pʰʊɾ.d̪ɪl xɑːn bɑː.ɾäk.záj]) (1785 – 22 June 1830) was the second Sardar of the Principality of Kandahar, who ruled from 1826 until his death in 1830.

== Early life ==
Pur Dil was born into a Barakzai family, to his father Payandah Khan and to the latter's fifth wife, a Ghilji lady, alongside his full-brothers, also known as the 'Dil Brothers': Sher Dil Khan, Kohan Dil Khan, Rahm Dil Khan and Mehr Dil Khan.

He became the Prince of Kandahar after his brother, Sher Dil Khan's death, which also led to internal fighting that caused the city's walls to decay.
