= Barakzai =

Pashtun tribe

Barakzai بارکزئ
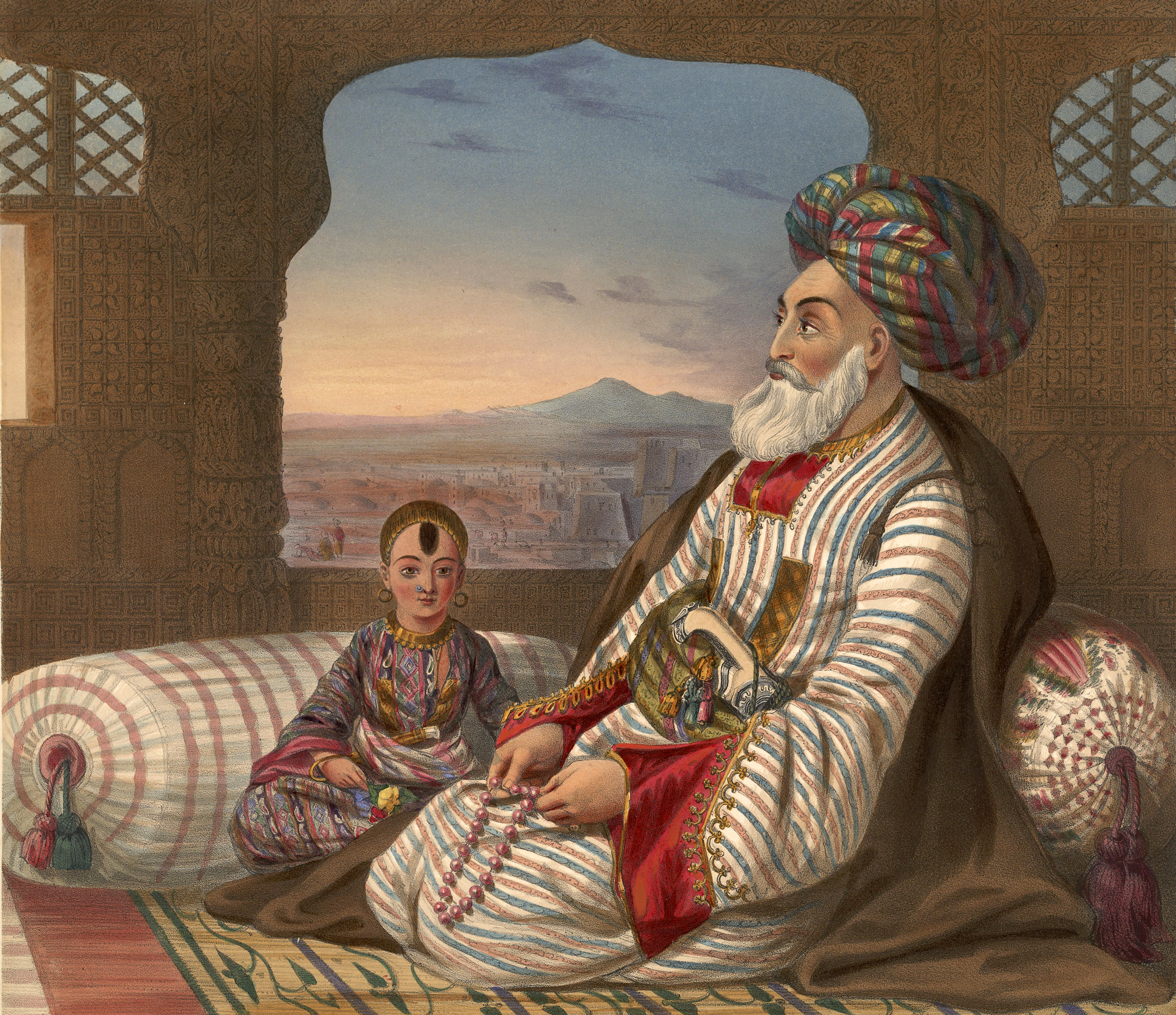
- Ethnicity: Pashtun
- Location: Afghanistan
- Parent tribe: Zirak branch of the Durrani
- Branches: Mohammadzai, Sherzai, Achakzai
- Language: Pashto
- Religion: Islam

Barakzai (Note: Pashto: بارکزی, romanized: Bārəkzai, pronounced [bɑrəkˈzaɪ]; pl. بارکزي Bārəkzī [bɑrəkˈzi]) is the name of a Pashtun tribe from Afghanistan

"Barakzai" is a common name among the Pashtuns, and it means 'son of Barak' in Pashto. According to the Encyclopædia Iranica, "In the detailed Pashtun genealogies there are no fewer than seven instances of the ethnic name Bārakzī, at very different levels of tribal segmentation. Six of them designate simple lineages within six different tribes located in the Solaymān mountains or adjacent lands... The seventh instance, on the other hand, designates one of the most important Pashtun tribes in numbers and historic role, part of the Zīrak branch of the Dorrānay confederation."

== History ==
Ludwig W. Adamec wrote that the Barakzai are "an important section of the Zirak branch of the Durrani to which the former Barakzai/Muhammadzai ruling family belongs. In numbers, economic, and political strength, the Barakzai were the paramount tribe of Afghanistan...They were soldiers in the service of Nadir Shah, founder of the short-lived Afsharid dynasty in Iran, and were settled on land seized from the Ghilzai. They continued to hold jagirs, fiefs, in exchange for their military services to Ahmad Shah Durrani. When Painda Khan, leader of the Barakzais, was assassinated, the Barakzai chiefs under Dost Muhammad ousted and replaced the Sadozai dynasty. The Barakzai continue to possess large areas of agricultural land and extensive flocks in the area between Herat and Kandahar."

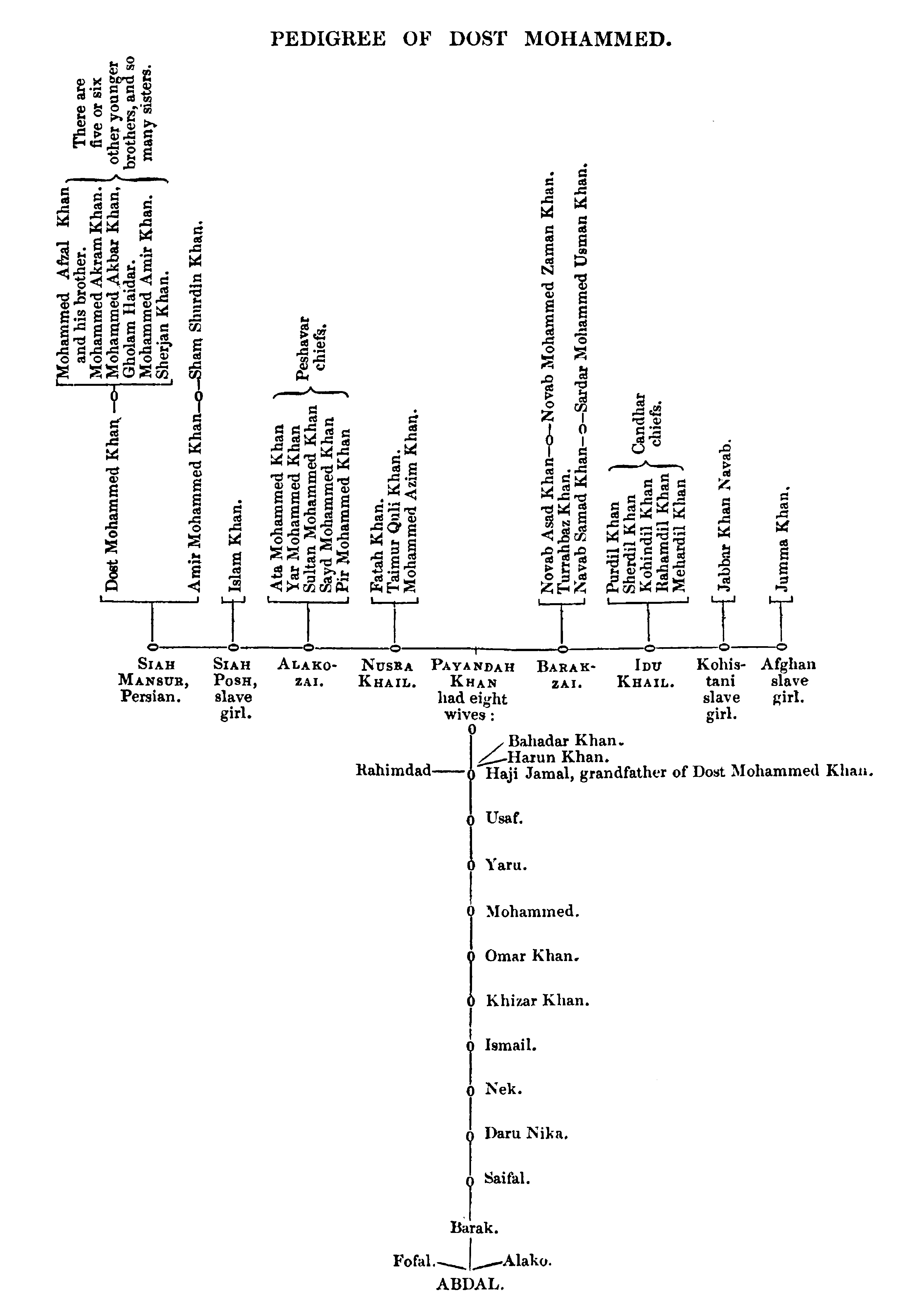
Pedigree of the Payendah Khel Pashtun clan of Afghanistan.

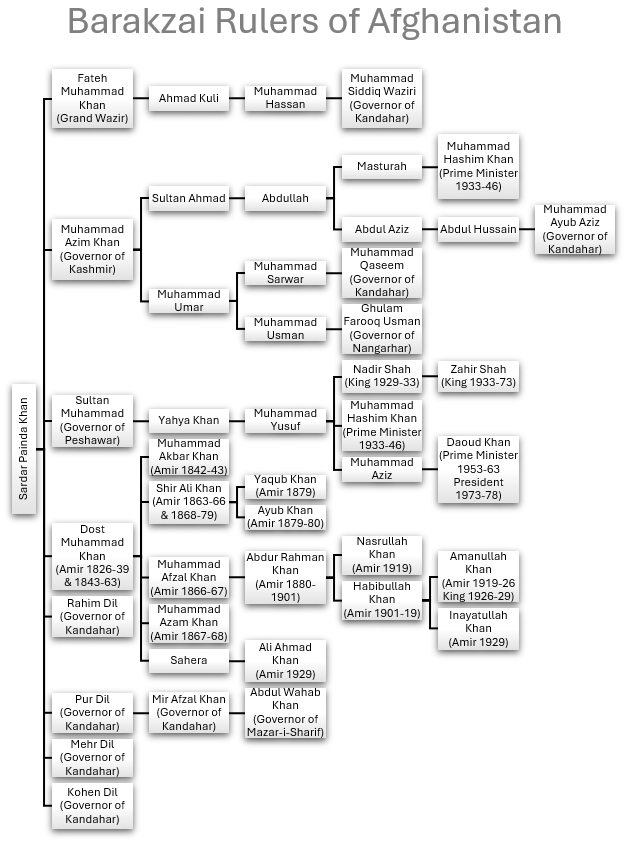
Genealogy of the rulers of Afghanistan from the Barakzai dynasty.

== Mohammadzai ==
Mohammadzai are the most prominent and powerful sub-tribe of Barakzai, they belong to the Zirak branch of the Durrani confederacy, and have a significant population in Kandahar. They can also be found in other provinces throughout Afghanistan as well across the border in Pakistan's Balochistan Province.

The Musahiban, originally the Yahya Khel clan, are descendants of Sultan Mohammad Khan. Mohammadzai Barakzai is closely related to Amanullah Khan.

== Dynasty ==
From 1826 to 1978, most rulers of Afghanistan belonged to the two branches of one Barakzai dynasty descending from the chiefs of the Barakzai tribe (belonging to the Mohammadzai sub-tribe).

- Emir Dost Muhammad Khan Barakzai - (First Mohammadzai Ruler)
- Emir Sher Ali Khan - Emir of Afghanistan
- Emir Yaqub Khan - Emir of Afghanistan, Signed treaty of Gandamak.
- Emir Abdur Rahman Khan - Emir of Afghanistan (October 1879/July 22, 1880 – October 3, 1901)
- Emir Habibullah Khan - Emir of Afghanistan (October 3, 1901 - February 20, 1919)
- Queen Sarwar Sultana Begum or (Ulya (Ulli) Hazrat) (1875 – 1965), was an Afghan royal consort married to Habibullah Khan (r. 1901–1919), and mother of king Amanullah Khan (r. 1919–1929).
- Emir Amanullah Khan - Emir of Afghanistan (February 28, 1919 – 1926), later King of Afghanistan (1926 - January 14, 1929)
- Queen Soraya Tarzi (w. of King Amanullah Khan) (November 29, 1899 - April 20, 1968).
- King Inayatullah Khan (January 14, 1929 - January 17, 1929).
- Emir Ali Ahmad Khan (January 17, 1929 - February 19, 1929) (June 23, 1929 - July 3, 1929).
- Mahmud Tarzi - Poet, Author and Diplomat. Credited for the modernization of Afghanistan.
- Loinab Sher Dil Khan Shaghasi, Governor of Balkh
- Loinab Khush Dil Khan Ghazi, Governor of Kabul and Kandahar
- Sardar Rahmdil Khan - Ruler of Kandahar & Baluchistan
- Sardar Kohan Dil Khan - Ruler of Kandahar & Baluchistan
- Sardar Payinda Khan - Ruler of Kandahar & Baluchistan. Father of All Mohammadzai's
- King Mohammed Nadir Shah (October 17, 1929 - November 8, 1933).
- King Mohammed Zahir Shah (November 8, 1933 - July 17, 1973.
- President Mohammad Daoud Khan (First Afghan President) (July 18, 1973 - April 28, 1978)

== Languages ==
The principal language of Barakzai is Pashto. Dari is also used as the language for records and correspondence.

== Notable people ==
- Jamal Khan, Chief of the Barakzai tribe
- Yar Mohammad Barakzai, Afghan footballer who took part in the 1948 Summer Olympics
- Hashmatullah Barakzai, Afghan footballer and former member of Afghanistan national football team
- Rokhan Barakzai, Afghan cricketer
- Mohammad Akbar Barakzai, Governor of Baghlan
- Haji Obaidullah Barakzai, Member of the House of the People of Afghanistan

== See also ==
- Barakzai dynasty
- Mohammadzai
- Shaghasi
- Barech
- Yousafzai
