= List of battles involving the Sikh Empire =

The Sikh Empire (1799 – 1849 CE) was established by Maharaja Ranjit Singh. Throughout its history, it fought various adversaries including the Durrani Empire of Afghanistan and the British East India Company.

== Background ==
The Sikhs first raised their weapons against the Mughal Empire under Guru Hargobind. Shri Guru Hargobind Ji was son of the 5th Shri Guru Arjan Dev Ji who was executed by the Mughal ruler Jahangir. After his father's death, Shri Guru Hargobind Ji added the martial element to Sikhism which was until then a religion mainly focused on Spirituality. But at this point the need for self defence was felt. Hence Shri Guru Hargobind Ji started recruiting an army which he called "Risaldari", after training his men in cavalry and Sikh Martial Arts. He adopted Royal symbols like wearing "kalgidhari turban" and keeping bodyguards. Along with that he asked his followers to gift him horses and weaponry instead of anything else. So the 6th Guru at one point managed to command 700 cavalry and with this might his Risaldari fought several small scale battles in 1620s and 1630s against Shahjahan's forces and some other warlords in Poadh and Majha. The tenth and the last Guru, Guru Gobind Singh organized Sikhs into a military sect called Khalsa (means "pure"), in 1699, against the Mughal emperor Aurangzeb. Before his death in 1708, he sent Banda Singh Bahadur to lead the Sikhs of Punjab. Banda Singh Bahadur through his outstanding leadership skills weakened the Mughal grasp over India. But he was later captured and beheaded in Delhi in 1716, during the reign of Farrukhsiyar.

Thereafter, Sikhs were divided into Misls. In 1738, Nadir Shah of the Afsharid dynasty attacked India and looted Delhi. The Mughals were never able to recover their power in the Punjab. Later, the Punjab was subject to constant invasions of Ahmad Shah Durrani of Afghanistan.

The Afghans led numerous campaigns to re-capture Lahore but ultimately had to return to Pashtun territories due to internal strife. After Ahmad Shah's final invasion of the Punjab in 1767, he left Lahore which was re-captured by the Sikhs. For more than three decades, Sikhs consolidated their power in areas of the Punjab, though facing repeated invasion attempts from other Afghan emperors such as Timur Shah Durrani, and Zaman Shah Durrani. The decisive moment came in 1790, when Ranjit Singh of Sukerchakia Misl became Misldar. He started uniting Misls and finally took Lahore in 1799. His coronation on 12 April 1801 marked the beginning of the Sikh Empire, which went on to conquer the whole Punjab, Kangra, parts of Kashmir and briefly, the city of Peshawar.

== List ==
Name of conflict (date)	Part of	Belligerents	Opponents	Outcome	Details
Katoch–Sikh War (1801)		Sikh Empire	Kangra State	Sikh victory	
Battle of Kasur (1807)		Sikh Empire	Durrani Empire	Sikh victory	
Battle of Jammu (1808)		Sikh Empire	Dogra Rajput	Sikh victory	
Gurkha-Sikh War (1809)		Sikh Empire	Kingdom of Nepal	Sikh victory	
Siege of Multan (1810)		Sikh Empire	Durrani Empire	Durrani victory	
Battle of Bhimber (1812)		Sikh Empire	Chibhal	Chibhal victory	
Battle of Anandpur (1812)		Sikh Empire	Kahlur	Sikh victory	
Afghan-Sikh Capture of Kashmir (1812–1813)		Sikh Empire; Durrani Empire	Kashmir under Ata Muhammad Khan	Sikh-Afghan victory	
Battle of Hasan Abdal (1813)		Sikh Empire	Pashtuns led by Wazir Fateh Khan Barakzai	Afghan victory	
Battle of Attock (1813)		Sikh Empire	Durrani Empire	Sikh victory	
Battle of Kashmir (1814)		Sikh Empire	Pashtuns led by Wazir Fateh Khan Barakzai	Afghan victory	
Battle of Multan (1818)		Sikh Empire	Durrani Empire	Sikh victory	
Battle of Shopian (1819)		Sikh Empire	Durrani Empire	Sikh victory	Kashmir is conquered by the Sikhs.
Battle of Gandgarh (1820)		Sikh Empire	Yousufzai Zamindars	Yousufzai Afghan victory	
Battle of Mangal (1821)		Sikh Empire	Jaduns and Tanaolis Tribes	Sikh victory	
Siege of Mankera (1821–1822)		Sikh Empire	Kingdom of Mankera	Sikh victory	
Battle of Taragarh (1822)		Sikh Empire	Afghan tribesmen	Sikh victory	
Battle of Nowshera (1823)		Sikh Empire	Coalition of Azim Khan	Sikh victory	
Battle of Akora Khattak (1826)		Sikh Empire	Mujahideen	Mujahideen victory	
Battle of Saidu (1827)		Sikh Empire	Mujahideen	Sikh victory	
Battle of Haidru (1828)		Sikh Empire	Mujahideen	Sikh victory	
Battle of Balakot (1831)		Sikh Empire	Mujahideen	Sikh victory	
Battle of Bannu (1832)		Sikh Empire	Local Pashtuns	Afghan victory	
Expedition of Shuja ul-Mulk (1833-1834)		Shah Shuja Durrani: British Empire; East India Company; Sikh Empire	Emirate of Kabul: Principality of Qandahar	Barakzai Afghan victory	Shah Shuja's expedition fails.
Battle of Peshawar (1834)		Sikh Empire	Peshawar Sardars	Sikh victory	Peshawar Sardars deposed from power.
Ladakh War (1834–1835)		Sikh Empire	Namgyal Dynasty	Sikh victory	Entirety of Ladakh annexed in Sino-Sikh War
Battle of Ramkani (1835)		Sikh Empire	Barakzai Dynasty	Inconclusive	
Standoff at the Khyber Pass (1835)		Sikh Empire	Emirate of Kabul	Inconclusive	Withdrawal of Dost Mohammad Khan, no battle fought.
Battle of Panjtar (1836)		Sikh Empire	Panjtar Pashtuns	Sikh victory	
Battle of Jamrud (1837)		Sikh Empire	Emirate of Afghanistan	Disputed	
1837 Poonch Revolt		Sikh Empire	Sudhans of Poonch	Sikh victory	Rebellion suppressed
Baltistan Expedition (1840)		Sikh Empire	Maqpon Dynasty	Sikh victory	Baltistan and Skardu annexed to the Sikh Empire
First Anglo-Afghan War; 1 October 1838 – October 1842		British Empire: East India Company; Sikh Empire; Shah Shuja; Sadozai loyalists; Maimana Khanate	Emirate of Kabul: Principality of Qandahar; Barakzai loyalists	British coalition defeat	Shah Shuja initially restored to the throne successfully, however is deposed and killed in 1842.
Battle of Mudki; 18 December 1845	First Anglo-Sikh War	British Empire	Sikh Empire	British victory	Night battle. The British won with heavy casualties amongst the higher ranks.
Battle of Ferozeshah; 21–22 December 1845	First Anglo-Sikh War	British Empire	Sikh Empire	British victory	British forces under Sir Hugh Gough won a Pyrrhic victory over the Sikh army under Lal Singh.
Battle of Sohana; January (?) 1846	First Anglo-Sikh War	British Empire	Sikh Empire	British victory	
Battle of Baddowal; 21 January 1846	First Anglo-Sikh War	Sikh Empire	British Empire	Sikh victory	Many Sikh soldiers crossed Satluj after being defeated at Mudki and Ferozeshah. When Harry Smith marched to Dharmkot to relieve Ludhiana, their rear was attacked by Sikhs under Ranjodh Singh Majithia.
Battle of Aliwal; 28 January 1846	First Anglo-Sikh War	British Empire	Sikh Empire	British victory	Company troops decisively defeated the Sikh army; turning point in the war.
Battle of Sobraon; 10 February 1846	First Anglo-Sikh War	British Empire	Sikh Empire	British victory	End of the war.
Battle of Ramnagar (1848); 22 November 1848	Second Anglo-Sikh War	Sikh Empire	British East Indian Company	Sikh victory	
Battle of Chillianwala (1849); 13 January 1849	Second Anglo-Sikh War	Sikh Empire	British East Indian Company	Sikh victory	
Siege of Multan (1848–1849) 19 April 1848 – 22 January 1849	Second Anglo-Sikh War	Sikh Empire	British East Indian Company	British victory	Fort was breached and Dewan Mulraj surrendered.
Battle of Gujrat (1849)	Second Anglo-Sikh War	Sikh Empire	British East Indian Company	British victory	Decisive defeat of the Sikh Empire. Young emperor Maharaja Dalip Singh was abducted and taken to England; Punjab was annexed as a province of the British Raj.

== See also ==
- Guru Gobind Singh
- Banda Singh Bahadur
- Baghel Singh
- Massa Ranghar
