= Siege of Mankera (1821–1822) =

- Part of the Afghan–Sikh Wars
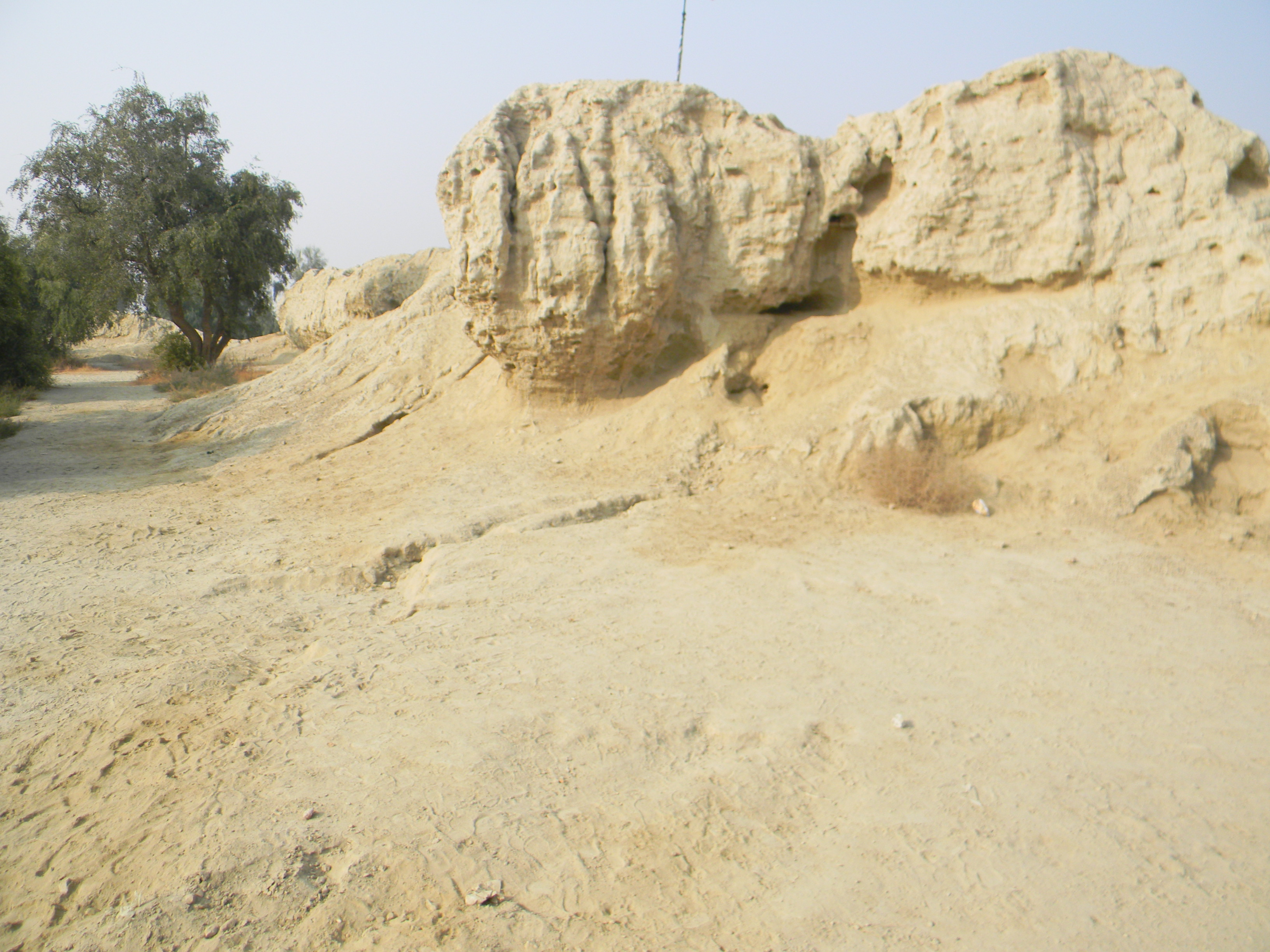
- Ruins of Mankera Fort
Date	7 December 1821 – 1 January 1822 (3 weeks, 4 days)
Location	Mankera
Result	Sikh victory
Territorial changes	Annexation of Mankera into Sikh Empire

Belligerents
Sikh Empire; Assisted by Tiwanas of Mitha Tiwana	Mankera State

Commanders and leaders
Ranjit Singh; Hari Singh; Khushal Singh; Misr Chand; Akali Singh; Faqir Azizuddin; Fateh Singh; Kirpa Ram; Gurmukh Singh; Dal Singh; Khushal Singh; Javala Singh; Jhanda Singh; Dhanna Singh; Gajja Singh (WIA); Mangal Singh †; Ahmad Tiwana	Hafiz Khan (surrendered)

Strength
3,000 under Maharaja Ranjit Singh; 15,000 under Khushal Singh; 8,000 under Misr Dewan Chand; 6,500 under Hari Singh Nalwa; Unknown under Ahmad Yar Khan	25,000

Casualties and losses
Unknown	Unknown

The Siege of Mankera, also known as the Fall of Mankera, was a military conflict from 7 December 1821 to 1 January 1822 between the Sikh forces led by Ranjit Singh, and the Mankeran forces led by Hafiz Khan.

== Background ==
The Sindh Sagar Doab was fully under the rule of the Kingdom of Mankera and Mitha Tiwana. The chief of Mankera Nawab Hafiz Ahmad Khan had the most control over the region. Mohammad Khan, the previous chief of Mankera, had built 12 forts outside the Mankera fort to make direct invasion of the main fort impossible. The fort used to be a part of the Bhangi Misl until they lost it and an independent state was formed. Instead of paying taxes to the Sikh Empire, the Nawab paid tribute to the Durrani Empire in Kabul. Furthermore, Mankera held the 3 important towns of Leiah, Bhakkar and Dera Ismail Khan, and the caravan route from Iran and Baluchistan also went through the territory of the Nawab. This made Mankera an important asset for the Sikh Empire to have. Therefore in the Dusshera of 1821, Ranjit Singh headed with his army to Mankera to annex it.

Ahmad Yar Khan Tiwana decided to aid the Sikh forces during the battle to settle old scores with the Nawab. Hari Singh Nalwa was invited to join the expedition. As he was heading to join the Maharaja with 7,000 troops, Nawla was challenged by 25,000 Pashtun and Hazara tribesmen and their leader, Mohammad Khan Tarain, who opposed the Sikh's passage from the area. This led to the Battle of Mangal in which Nalwa defeated the tribesmen and continued towards Ranjit Singh until meeting him at Mitha Tiwana.

== Battle ==
The Sikh forces arrived at Mankera on 9 November 1821. They took Bhakkar without a fight and Dera Ismail Khan and Leiah were taken by the Sikhs with a fight. Next the entire army regathered and laid siege to the fort of Mankera. Since Mankera was situated in the middle of a sandy desert, the Sikhs dug up 25 wells for people to drink from. Nawab Hafiz along with Sakhi Jan Jadoon, knowing that he could not resist any longer offered terms of surrender. These terms stated that he be allowed to leave the fort with personal things and to be given the town of Dera Ismail Khan as a jagir. The terms were accepted and the Nawab came out after 25 days of being besieged.

== Aftermath ==
After this siege, the land between the Jhelum and the Indus was annexed by the Sikh Empire. It was also the key of having influence over the Derajat region. The Maharaja was impressed by the contribution of the Tiwanas during the battle and asked for him to take on horsemen with him to Lahore.

== See also ==
- Nihang
- Martyrdom and Sikhism
