= Gurmukh Singh =

Gurmukh Singh may refer to:

- Gurmukh Singh (footballer), Indian footballer
- Gurmukh Singh (First World War), British Indian Empire soldier who won the Indian Order of Merit
- Gurmukh Nihal Singh (1895–unknown), Indian politician, first governor of Rajasthan
- Baba Gurmukh Singh, member of the Ghadr Party
- Bhai Gurmukh Singh, leader of the Singh Sabha movement in British India
- Sepoy Gurmukh Singh IOM, British Indian Empire soldier who died at the Battle of Saragarhi in 1897
- Gurmukh Singh Bali (1954–2021), Indian politician
- Gurmukh Singh Musafir, former Chief Minister of Punjab, India

== See also ==
- Gurmukh, concept within Sikhism
- Gurmukh Singhwala, village in Punjab, India
- Gurmukh Kaur Khalsa (born 1942 or 1943), American yoga teacher
- Gurmukhi, Indic script used to write Punjabi language
