= Arjan Singh Nalwa =

Sikh military commander

Arjan Singh Nalwa (died 1848) was the youngest son of Sardar Hari Singh Nalwa and a minor jagirdar and rebel who refused to surrender to British rule in Punjab after the conclusion of the Second Anglo-Sikh War. He locked himself up in his estate in Gujranwala with 100 of his men and fought off a party sent by the Lahore Darbar to subdue him. Finally, a company of Skinner's Horse was sent to bring him in, but he escaped from his estate in time and died on the run a few years later. His property was confiscated by the British.

== Popular culture ==
Arjan Singh Nalwa is the focus of the song 'Arjan Vailly' from the 2023 Bollywood film Animal. The film character, played by Ranbir Kapoor, is shown as a violent, stubborn, but courageous individual, which accurately reflects Arjan Singh’s real personality.
