= Battle of Panjtar =

Battle of Afghan-Sikh Wars

- Part of the Afghan–Sikh Wars
Date	November 1836
Location	Panjtar, Buner, Khyber Pakhtunkhwa
Result	Sikh Victory

Belligerents
Sikh Empire	Panjtar Pashtuns

Commanders and leaders
Hari Singh; Zorawar Singh	Fateh Khan (surrendered)

Strength
14,000-15,000	15,000

Casualties and losses
Unknown	Heavy

The Battle of Panjtar was fought in November 1836 as part of the Afghan–Sikh Wars.

== Background ==
Panjtar had been enemies with the Sikhs for a long time. The chief Fateh Khan had teamed up with Syed Ahmad Barelvi against the Sikhs.

== Battle ==
Fateh Khan had started making disturbances towards the Sikhs in 1836. Hari Singh Nalwa with a force of 14–15,000 troops attacked Panjtar and defeated Fateh Khan. It was reported that 15,000 pashtuns fled before the Sikhs. Many were killed and the rest were taken refuge to the hills. The chief was forced to sign a document stating his submission to the Sikh Empire.

== Aftermath ==
After this battle, Fateh Khan began to act like he never signed a document towards his submission and continued to harass the Sikhs. The Maharaja sent Gulab Singh to settle the deal and all the Yusufzais fled to the mountains.

== See also ==
- Nihang
- Martyrdom and Sikhism
