= Hari Singh Nalwa =

General of the Sikh Empire (1791–1837)

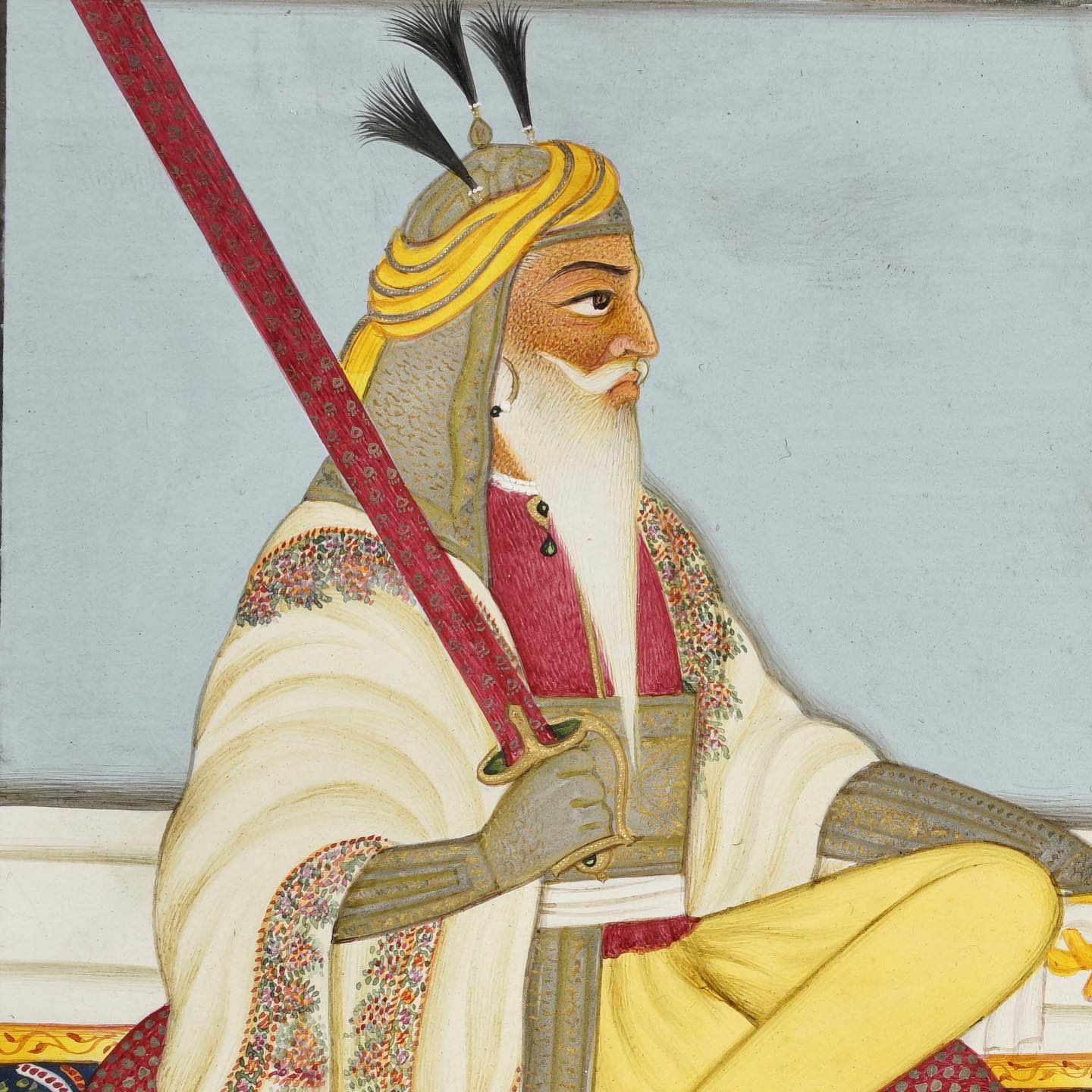
- Painting of Hari Singh Nalwa, by Hasan al-Din, Lahore, ca.1845-50

Governor of Kashmir
- In office 1820–1821
- Monarch: Ranjit Singh
- Preceded by: Moti Ram
- Succeeded by: Moti Ram

Governor of Hazara
- In office 1822–1837
- Preceded by: Amar Singh Majithia
- Succeeded by: Mahan Singh Hazarawala

Governor of Peshawar
- In office 1834–1837
- Preceded by: Sultan Mohammad Khan
- Succeeded by: Paolo Avitabile

Personal details
- Born: 29 April 1791 Gujranwala, Shukarchakia Misl, Sikh Confederacy (present-day Punjab, Pakistan)
- Died: 30 April 1837 (aged 46) Jamrud, Khyber Pass, Sikh Empire (present-day Khyber Pakhtunkhwa, Pakistan)
- Spouses: Raj Kaur; Desan Kaur
- Children: Arjan Singh Nalwa, Jawahir Singh Nalwa, Nand Kaur, Gurdit Singhji, Chand Kaur
- Parents: Gurdial Singh (father); Dharm Kaur (mother)
- Awards: Izazi-i-Sardari
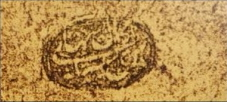
- Signature
- Nicknames: Baghmar; (Tiger-Killer)

Military service
- Allegiance: Sikh Empire
- Branch/service: Sikh Khalsa Army
- Years of service: 1804–1837
- Rank: Jarnail of the Sikh Khalsa Fauj; Commander-in-chief along the Afghan Frontier (1825–1837)
- Commands: Diwan of Kashmir (1820–1); Diwan of Hazara (1822–1837); Diwan of Peshawar (1834-5, 1836–7)
- Battles/wars: Afghan-Sikh Wars; Battle of Barnala; Battle of Kasur (1807); Battle of Sialkot (1808); Battle of Jammu (1808); Siege of Multan (1810); Battle of Mitha Tiwana (1812); Battle of Uch (1812); Battle of Attock (1813); Battle of Kashmir (1814); Battle of Rajauri (1815); Conquest of Mahmudkot (1816); Battle of Multan (1818); Battle of Peshawar (1818); Battle of Shopian (1819); Battle of Pakhli (1819); Battle of Darband (1820); Battle of Baramula (1820); Battle of Mirpur (1821); Battle of Poonch (1821); Battle of Rajauri (1821); Battle of Dhamtaur(1821); Battle of Mangal (1821); Siege of Mankera (1821-1822); Battle of Khakha (1822); Battle of Nowshera (1823); Siege of Manshera (1823); Revolt of Sarbuland Khan (1824); Battle of Nara (1824); Battle of Gandgarh (1824); Battle of Nagra (1824); Battle of Sirikot (1824); Battle of Darband (1825); Battle of Shaidu (1827); Battle of Haidru (1828); Battle of Kangra (1828); Battle of Phulra (1829); Battle of Tulandi (1829); Battle of Panjtar (1829); Battle of Muzaffarabad (1830); Battle of Balakot (1831); Revolt of Painda Khan (1832); Battle of Peshawar (1837); Battle of Khyber Pass (1835); Battle of Michni (1836); Battle of Jamrud (1836); Battle of Panjtar (1836); Rescue of Sikhs (1837); Battle of Jamrud (1837) †

Hari Singh Nalwa (29 April 1791 – 30 April 1837) was the commander-in-chief of the Sikh Khalsa Army, the army of the Sikh Empire. He is known for his role in the conquests of Kasur, Sialkot, Attock, Multan, Kashmir, Peshawar and Jamrud. Hari Singh Nalwa was responsible for expanding the frontier of Sikh Empire to beyond the Indus River right up to the mouth of the Khyber Pass. At the time of his death, Jamrud constituted the western boundary of the Empire.

He served as governor of Kashmir, Peshawar and Hazara. He established a mint on behalf of the Sikh Empire to facilitate revenue collection in Kashmir and Peshawar.

== Early life ==
Hari Singh was born in Gujranwala, in the Majha region of Punjab to Dharam Kaur and Gurdial Singh of the Uppal Khatri community. After his father died in 1798, he was raised by his mother. In 1801, at the age of ten, he took Amrit Sanchar and was initiated as a Khalsa. At the age of twelve, he began to manage his father's estate and took up horse riding.

In 1804, his mother sent him to the court of Ranjit Singh to resolve a property dispute. Ranjit Singh decided the arbitration in his favor because of his background and aptitude. Hari Singh had explained that his father and grandfather had served under Maha Singh and Charat Singh, the maharaja's ancestors, and demonstrated his skills as a horseman and musketeer. Ranjit Singh appointed him as a personal attendant at the court.

Hari Singh Nalwa had two wives, as was customary at the time: Raj Kaur from Rawalpindi and Desan Kaur. He had four sons and two daughters.

== Military career ==
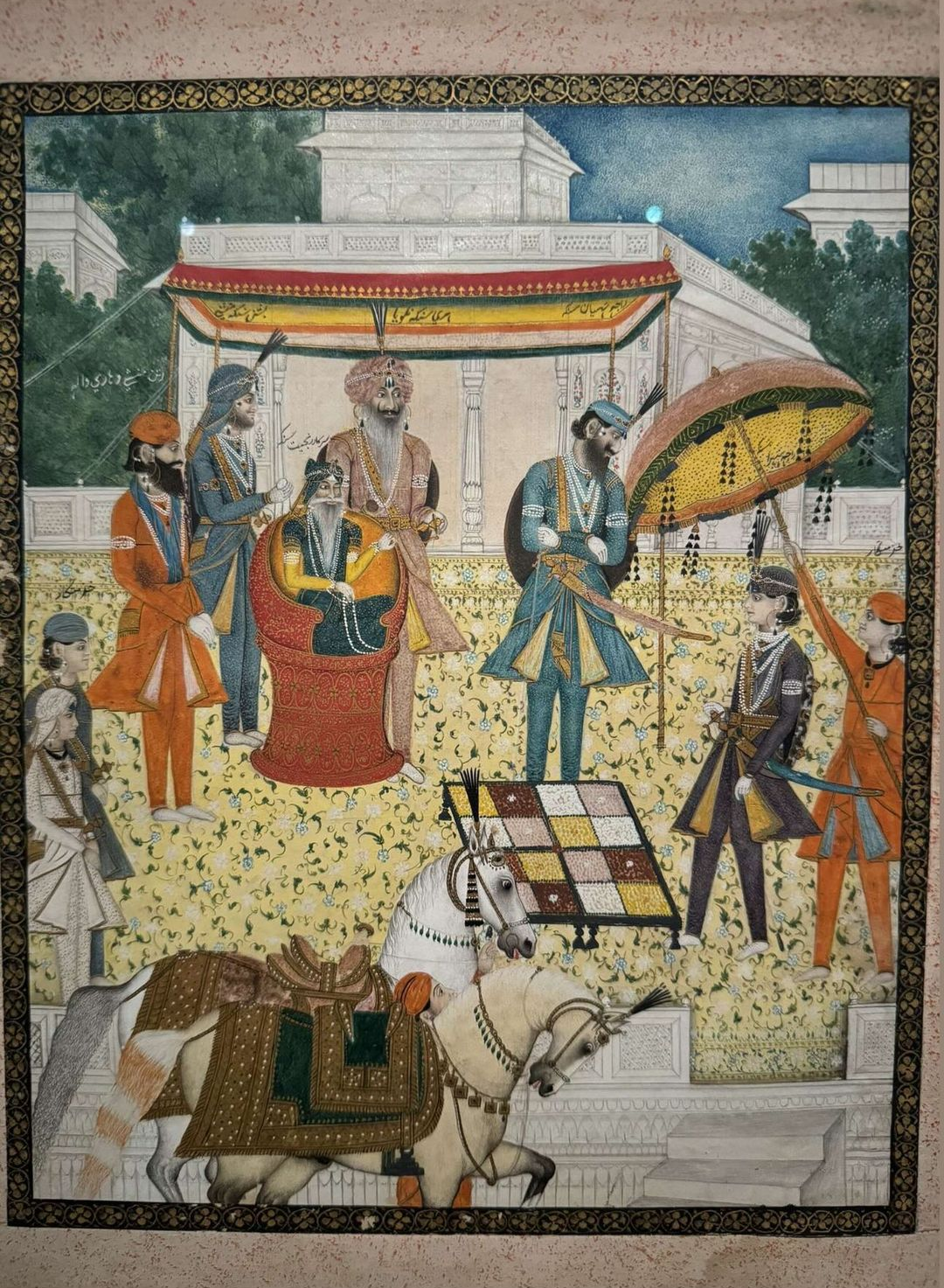
Maharaja Ranjit Singh inspecting horses with Hari Singh Nalwa

During a hunt in 1804, a tiger attacked him and also killed his horse. His fellow hunters attempted to protect him but he refused their offers and allegedly killed the tiger by himself using a dagger while fending off blows with a shield, thus earning the cognomen Baghmar (Tiger-killer). Whether he was by that time already serving in the military is unknown but he was commissioned as sardar, commanding 800 horses and footmen, in that year.

=== Battle of Kasur (1807) ===
Hari Singh's first significant participation in a Sikh conquest was at age 16 in 1807 during the battle of Kasur, which had long been a thorn in the side of Ranjit Singh's power because of its proximity to his capital city of Lahore. It was captured in the fourth attempt. This attack was led by Maharaja Ranjit Singh and Jodh Singh Ramgarhia. During the campaign Nalwa showed remarkable bravery and dexterity. The Sardar was granted a jagir in recognition of his services.

=== Siege of Multan (1807) ===
Ranjit Singh attacked Multan seven times. Hari Singh Nalwa fought in five of them. Ranjit Singh did not wish to finish his enemies in one stroke as he wanted to weaken his enemies into a position where they could be easily conquered. On their march to Multan, they conquered the territories of Dipalpur and Jhang. The Sikhs besieged the Multan Fort. Peace was made through the help of Fateh Singh Kaliawalia. The Maharaja lifted the siege after the payment of a large sum.

=== Battle of Sialkot (1807) ===
Ranjit Singh nominated Hari Singh Nalwa to take Sialkot from its ruler Jiwan Singh. This was his first battle with an independent command. The two armies engaged for a couple of days, eventually seventeen year old Hari Singh won. Nalwa lead the army to victory and planted the Sikh flag on top of the fort.

=== Battle of Jammu (1808) ===
The Sikhs invaded Jammu in 1808 as after Hari Singh Nalwa conquered Sialkot, Ranjit Singh had ordered him to take the surrounding areas of Jammu as well. He was aided by a Sikh named Hukam Singh Chimni and they successfully managed to conquer the city.

=== Siege of Multan (1810) ===
Nalwa once more besieged Multan in 1810. Ranjit Singh had given out an order to Muzaffar Khan to pay tribute, but the latter refused. Because of this, the Sikhs besieged Multan once more. In this battle, Hari Singh Nalwa got seriously wounded while climbing the fort because of a fire-pot that was thrown at him. Muzaffar Khan unsuccessfully sought for support from the British but after two months of siege, Nawab Muzaffar Khan surrendered. Muzaffar Khan had to pay a tribute of 180,000 rupees and 20 horses to the Sikhs.

=== Battle of Attock (1813) ===
The fort of Attock was a major replenishment point for all armies crossing the Indus. In the early 19th century, Afghan appointees of the Kingdom of Kabul held this fort, as they did most of the territory along this frontier. This battle was fought and won by the Sikhs on the banks of the Indus under the leadership of Mohkam Chand, Maharaja Ranjit Singh's general, against Wazir Fatteh Khan and his brother Dost Mohammad Khan, on behalf of Shah Mahmud of Kabul. Besides Hari Singh Nalwa, Hukam Singh Attariwala, Shyamu Singh, Khalsa Fateh Singh Ahluwalia and Behmam Singh Malliawala actively participated in this battle. With the conquest of Attock, the adjoining regions of Hazara-i-Karlugh and Gandhgarh became tributary to the Sikhs. In 1815, Sherbaz Khan of Gandhgarh challenged Hari Singh Nalwa's authority and was defeated.

=== Campaign in Kashmir ===
The Sikhs made an attempt to take Kashmir soon after the battle of Attock. The army was under the general command of Maharaja Ranjit Singh, who camped at Rajauri. The troops were led towards Srinagar by Ram Dayal, grandson of Dewan Mokham Chand, while Jamadar Khushal Singh commanded the van, Hari Singh Nalwa and Nihal Singh Attariwala brought up the rear. Lack of provisions, delay in the arrival of reinforcements, bad weather and treachery of the allies lead to the Sikhs to retreat. The next few years were spent in subduing Muslim chiefs within the Kashmir territory, en route Srinagar Valley. In 1815–16, Hari Singh Nalwa attacked and destroyed the stronghold of the traitorous Rajauri chief.

=== Conquest of Mahmudkot (1816) ===
In preparation of the conquest of the strongly fortified Mankera, Maharaja Ranjit Singh decided to approach it from its southern extremity. After the Baisakhi of 1816, Misr Diwan Chand, Ilahi Bakhsh, Fateh Singh Ahluwalia, Nihal Singh Attariwala and Hari Singh Nalwa accompanied by seven paltans and the topkhana went towards Mahmudkot. When news of its conquest arrived, it left the maharaja so elated at the success of Sikh arms that he celebrated this victory with the firing of cannons. Two years later, on their way to Multan, the Sikhs captured the forts of Khangarh and Muzzaffargarh.

=== Battle of Multan (1818) ===
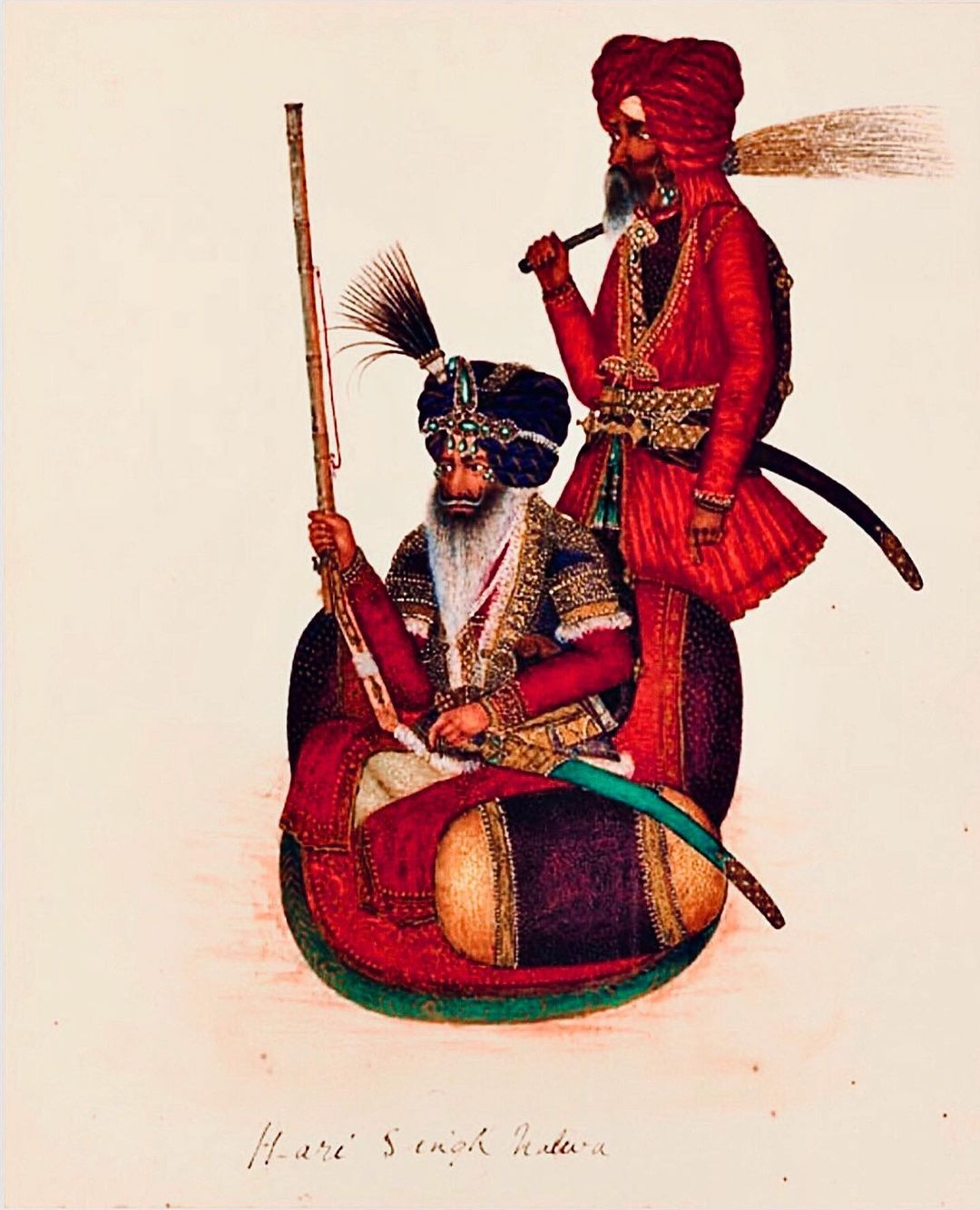
Sardar Hari Singh Nalwa (seated) with a fly-whisk attendant

By 1818, Muzaffar Khan's resources had been looted by Ranjit Singh in his previous expeditions of Multan. He again ordered the Sikhs to march towards Multan. As soon as the order was received, a force of 15,000 Sikhs clashed between a force of 40,000 Afghans. Another force of 10,000 Sikhs under Dhena Singh reinforced the Sikhs. Muzaffar Khan challenged the Sikhs with a sword valiantly but was shot down with five of his sons. Hari Singh Nalwa was "chiefly instrumental" in the capture of the citadel. The famous Zamzama cannon was badly damaged in the siege. The Sikhs finally captured the city after six attempts. In the siege 1,900 Sikhs were killed and 4,000 wounded. The Afghans had 12,000 men killed.

==== Peshawar becomes tributary (1818) ====
When Shah Mahmud's son, Shah Kamran, killed their Wazir Fateh Khan Barakzai in August 1818 the Sikhs took advantage of the resulting confusion and their army formally forded the Indus and entered Peshawar, the summer capital of the Kingdom of Kabul (modern-day Afghanistan), for the first time. Thereafter, Hari Singh Nalwa was deputed towards Peshawar in order to keep the Sikh dabdaba kayam — maintain the pressure.

=== Mitha Tiwana ===
Hari Singh Nalwa was left at the suburbs of Mitha Tiwana by Dewan Mokham Chand as an order from the Maharaja. He achieved significant success and was given the jagir of Mitha Tiwana.

=== Capture of Kashmir ===
In 1819 Maharaja Ranjit Singh was asked to annex Kashmir from the Durrani Empire as the Afghan rule was very unpopular among the people of Kashmir. Thus Ranjit Singh sent an expeditionary force. The Sikh expeditionary force established two armories for the expedition at Gujrat and Wazirabad. The expedition was split into three columns: Misr Diwan Chand commanded the advance force of about 12,000 with heavy artillery where Kharak Singh and Hari Singh Nalwa marched behind him, and Ranjit Singh commanded the rear guard, protecting the supply train. The expeditionary force marched to Bhimber and resupplied, capturing the fort of a local Hakim without resistance. On 1 May, both columns of the Sikh Army reached Rajouri and its ruler, Raja Agarullah Khan, rebelled and forced a battle. Hari Singh Nalwa took command of a force and routed his army, which offered an unconditional surrender after losing most of its men and war supplies. His brother, Raja Rahimullah Khan, was appointed the Raja of Rajauri in return for assistance in navigating the 'Behram Pass' (the lower end of the Pir Panjal Pass).

Once the Sikh forces reached the Behram Pass, the Durrani-appointed faujdar charged with guarding it, fled to Srinagar. Mir Mohammad Khan, the kotwal of Poonch, and Mohammad Ali, the kotwal of Shopian, attempted a defense at the Dhaki Deo and Maja passed, but were defeated and surrendered to the Sikhs on 23 June 1819.

On 5 July 1819, the Sikh army attempted to march through Shopian to Srinagar but was stopped by a Durrani army headed by Jabbar Khan. The Durrani force had heavily entrenched itself in preparation for the Sikh artillery attack and brought heavy artillery, which the Sikhs were unprepared for because they had brought only light guns.

Once his artillery was in range, Misr Diwan Chand opened the battle with an artillery barrage and multiple infantry and cavalry charges. The Durrani army was able to hold back the Sikh attempts to storm their lines until the Sikhs began moving their guns forward. However, when Misr Diwan Chand was overseeing the movement of guns on the Sikh left flank, Jabbar Khan saw an opening and led the Durrani right flank which stormed Misr Diwan Chand's artillery battery, captured two guns, and threw the Sikh left flank in "disarray". However the Durrani force attacking the Sikh left flank was exposed from their left and Akali Phoola Singh, the commander of the Sikh right flank, rallied his troops and led his command in a charge across the battlefield to the artillery battery. After a close quarters fight which resulted in both sides resorting to using swords and daggers, the Durrani soldiers proved to be ineffective against the much superior martial skills of the Sikh soldiers and sections of the Durrani force began to retreat and Jabbar Khan was wounded while escaping the battlefield. On 15 July 1819, the Sikh army made their way into Srinagar.

=== Battle of Pakhli (1819) ===
Following the capture of Kashmir, tribute was due from Pakhli, Damtaur and Darband. Hari Singh Nalwa along with his companions marched through Pakhli in order to collect tribute. The request for tribute resulted in fighting and the Sikhs got the tribute after a well fought battle.

=== Battle of Mangal (1821) ===
The Maharaja summoned Nalwa to pay his tax. He marched by Pakhli and Muzaffarabad with a force of 7,000 foot. When he was passing through Mangal in the Khyber Pakhtunkhwa Province, he found a large tribal force of 25,000 to 30,000 troops under Bostan Khan and Mohammad Khan Tarain. The Sikh Review Volume 23 gives a number of 70,000 troops, which is unlikely and probably exaggerated. Despite being heavily outnumbered, Nalwa with his Sikhs defeated the Afghans who lost 2,000 soldiers.

=== Battle of Mankera (1822) ===
The Sindh Sagar Doab was chiefly controlled from Mankera and Mitha Tiwana. Nawab Hafiz Ahmed Khan, a relative of the Durranis, exerted considerable influence in this region. Besides Mankera, he commanded a vast area protected by 12 forts. With the weakening of Afghan rule in Kabul, the governors of Attock, Mankera, Mitha Tiwana and Khushab had declared their independence. Ranjit Singh celebrated the Dussehra of 1821 across the river Ravi, at Shahdera. Hari Singh, Governor of Kashmir, was most familiar with the territory that the Maharaja had now set his eyes on. Nalwa was summoned post-haste to join the Lahore Army already on its way towards the river Indus. The Maharaja and his army had crossed the Jehlum when Hari Singh Nalwa, accompanied by his Kashmir platoons, joined them at Mitha Tiwana. The Sikhs commenced offensive operations in early November.

Nawab Hafiz Ahmed's predecessor, Nawab Mohammed Khan, had formed a cordon around Mankera with 12 forts—Haidrabad, Maujgarh, Fatehpur, Pipal, Darya Khan, Khanpur, Jhandawala, Kalor, Dulewala, Bhakkar, Dingana and Chaubara. The Sikh army occupied these forts and soon the only place that remained to be conquered was Mankera itself. A few years earlier, the Nawab of Mankera had actively participated in the reduction of Mitha Tiwana. The Tiwanas, now feudatories of Hari Singh Nalwa, were eager participants in returning that favour to the Nawab. The force was divided into three parts—one column being under Hari Singh—and each column entered the Mankera territory by a different route; capturing various places en route all three columns rejoined near Mankera town. Mankera was besieged, with Nalwa's force being on the west of the fort.

The Nawab was allowed to proceed towards Dera Ismail Khan, which was granted to him as jagir. His descendants held the area until 1836.

=== Battle of Nowshera (Naushehra) (1823) ===
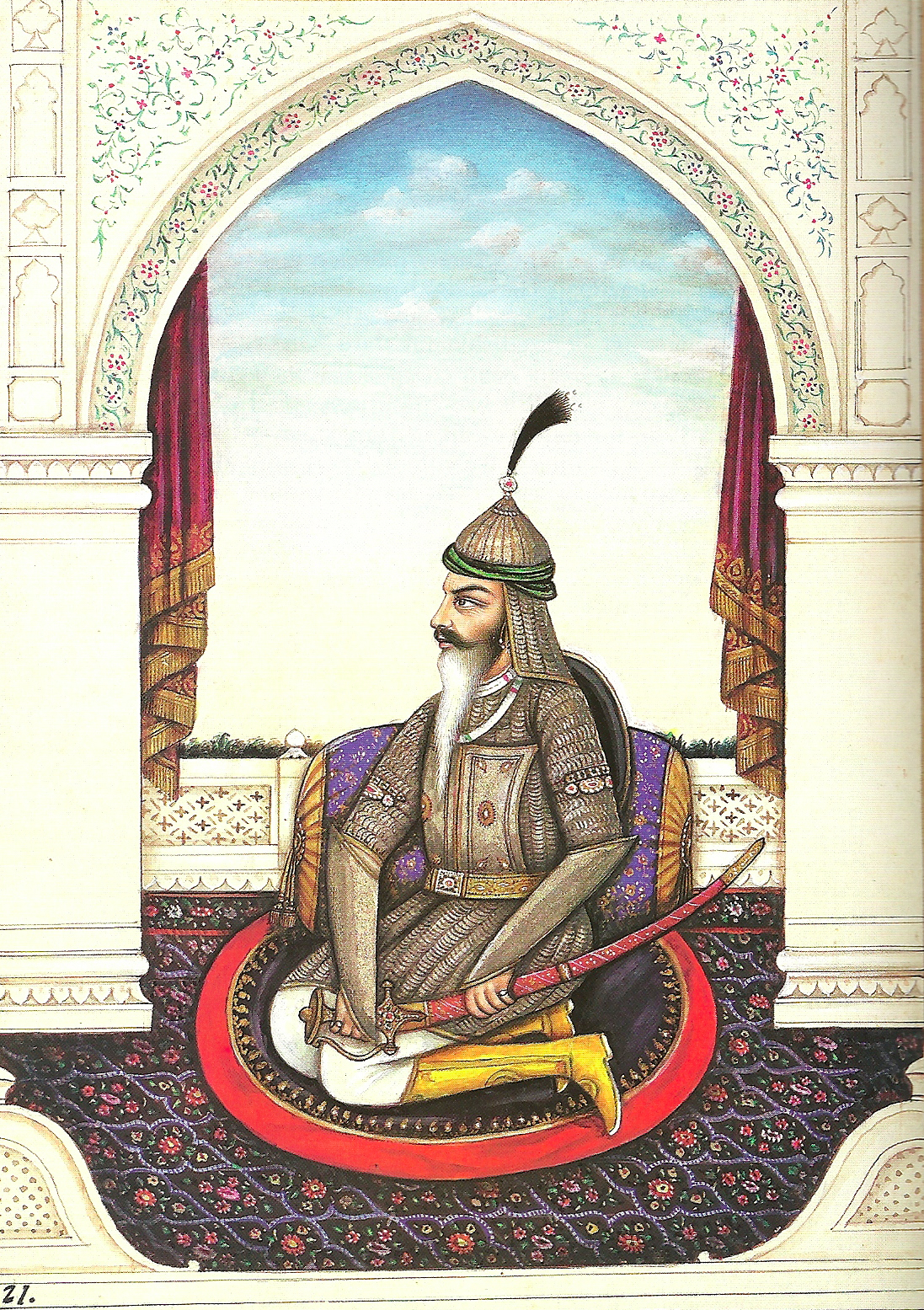
"Hari Singh Nalwa seated in full armour and adopting a military stance" – copy of a native painting by Sir John Mcqueen

The Sikhs forayed into Peshawar for the first time in 1818, but did not occupy the territory. They were content with collecting tribute from Yar Mohammed, its Barakzai governor. Azim Khan, Yar Mohammed's half-brother in Kabul, totally disapproved of the latter's deference to the Sikhs and decided to march down at the head of a large force to vindicate the honour of the Afghans. Azim Khan wanted to avenge both, the supplication of his Peshawar brethren and the loss of Kashmir. Hari Singh Nalwa was the first to cross the Indus at Attock to the Sikh post of Khairabad; he was accompanied by Diwan Kirpa Ram and Khalsa Sher Singh, the Maharaja's teenaged son, beside 8,000 men.

The Afghan army was expected near Nowshera, on the banks of the river Kabul (Landai). Hari Singh's immediate plan was to capture the Yusafzai stronghold to the north of the Landai at Jehangira, and the Khattak territory to its south at Akora Khattak. Jehangira was a masonry fort with very strong towers and the Afghan Yusafzais offered tough resistance. Hari Singh entered the fort and established his thana there. The remaining troops re-crossed the Landai River and returned to their base camp at Akora. Mohammed Azim Khan had encamped roughly ten miles north-west of Hari Singh's position, on the right bank of the Landai, facing the town of Nowshera, awaiting Ranjit Singh's approach. The Sikhs had scheduled two battles – one along either bank of the Landai.

After Hari Singh had successfully reduced the Afghan tribal strongholds on either side of the river, Ranjit Singh departed from the fort of Attock. He crossed the Landai River at a ford below Akora, and set up his camp near the fort of Jehangira. The famous army commander Akali Phula Singh and Gurkha commander Bal Bahadur, with their respective troops, accompanied the Maharaja. The Afghan Barakzais witnessed the battle from across the river. They were not able to cross the Landai river. Eventually, the inheritors of Ahmed Shah Abdali's legacy withdrew from the area, toward the direction of Jalalabad.

=== Battle of Sirikot (1824) ===
Sirikot lay less than ten miles to the north-west of Haripur. This Mashwani village was strategically placed in a basin at the top of the north-east end of the Gandhgarh Range, which made its secure location a haven for the rebellious chiefs in the entire region. Hari Singh Nalwa went towards Sirikot before the rains of 1824. It was another six months before the attempt produced conclusive results. The Sardar almost lost his life in the course of this expedition. Ranjit Singh's military campaign for the winter of 1824 was scheduled towards Peshawar and Kabul. While stationed at Wazirabad, he received an arzi (written petition) from Sardar Hari Singh informing him that he and his men were overwhelmingly outnumbered – one Sikh to ten Afghans. Ranjit Singh marched to [Rohtas], from there to [Rawalpindi] and via [Sarai Kala] reached Sirikot. With news of the approach of the Sikh army, the Afghans withdrew.

=== Battle of Saidu (1827) ===
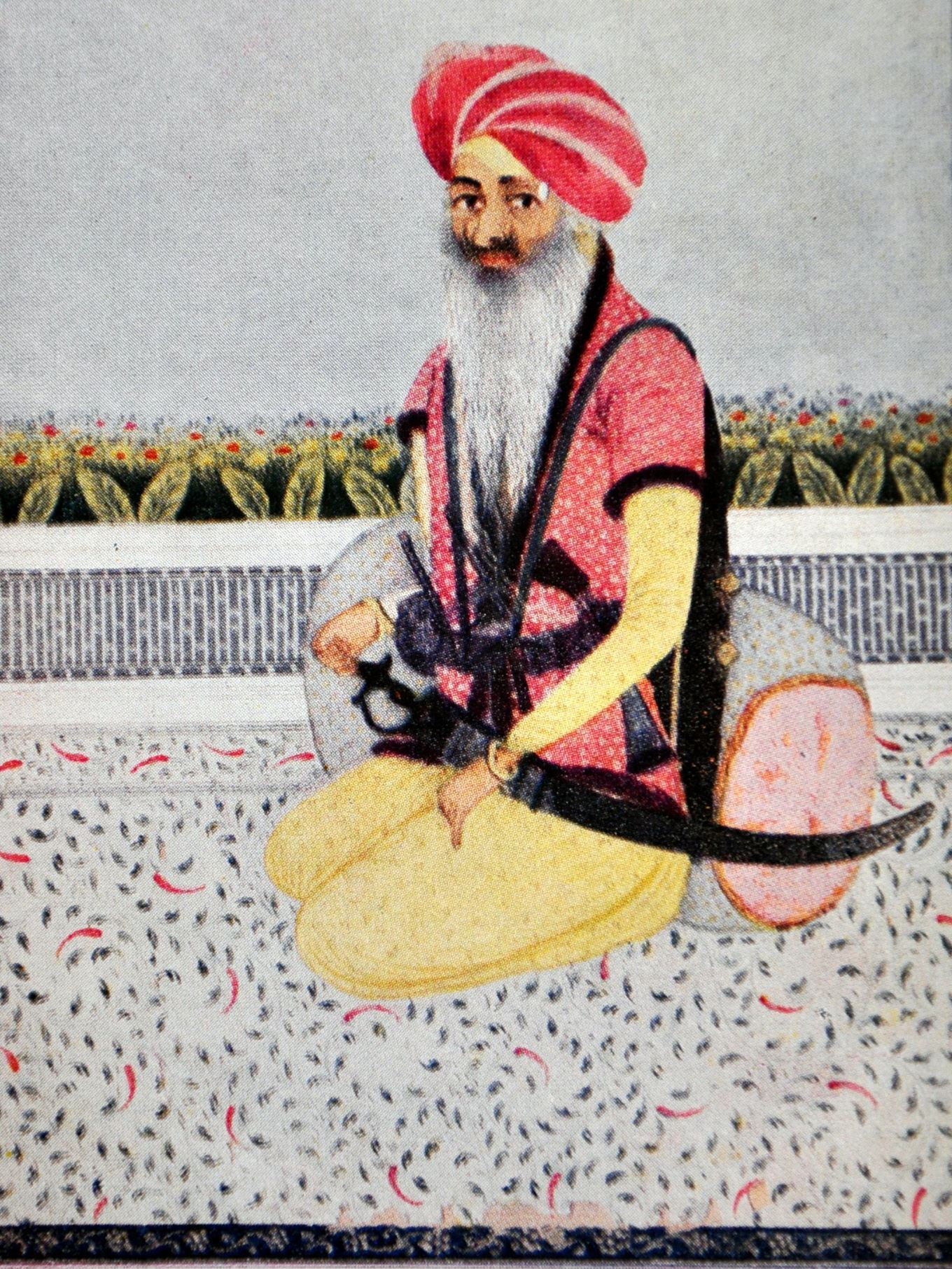
Painting of Hari Singh Nalwa wearing a red turban, leaning against a bolster, and armed with a sword with a dark-coloured sheath

The redeemer of the Yusafzais came in the form of one Sayyid Ahmad , who despite being a 'Hindki' was accepted as a leader by them. Budh Singh Sandhanwalia, accompanied by 4,000 horsemen, was deputed towards Attock to assist in suppressing the Yusafzai rebellion. The Maharaja's brief required him to thereafter to proceed towards Peshawar and collect tribute from Yar Mohammed Khan Barakzai. Budh Singh first heard of the Sayyid after he had crossed the Indus and encamped near the fort of Khairabad. Ranjit Singh was still on the sickbed when the news of the Sayyid's arrival, at the head of a large force of the Yusafzai peasantry, reached him. The gallantry of the Yusafzai defence in the Battle of Nowshera was still vivid in his mind. On receiving this news, he immediately put into motion all the forces that he could muster and immediately dispatched them towards the frontier.

The Barakzais in Peshawar, though outwardly professing allegiance to the Sikhs, were in reality in league with the other Afghans. The Sayyid marched from Peshawar in the direction of Nowshera. Sardar Budh Singh wrote to the Sayyid seeking for a clarification of his intention. The Sayyid replied that he wished to first take the fort of Attock and then engage Budh Singh in battle.

Hari Singh Nalwa stood guard at the fort of Attock with the intention of keeping the Sayyid and his men from crossing the river until reinforcements arrived from Lahore. News had reached the Sikhs that the jihadis accompanying the Sayyid numbered several thousand. The battle between the Sayyid and the Sikhs was fought on 14 Phagun (23 February) 1827. The action commenced at about ten in the morning. The Muslim war cry of Allah hu Akbar, or "God is the greatest", was answered by the Sikhs with Bole so nihal, Sat Sri Akal, or "they who affirm the name of God, the only immortal truth, will find fulfilment". Ironically, the opposing forces first professed the glory of the very same God Almighty, albeit in different languages, before they commenced slaughtering each other. The cannonade lasted about two hours. The Sikhs charged at their opponents, routed them, and continued a victorious pursuit for six miles, taking all their guns, swivels and camp equipment. 150,000.

==== Occupies Peshawar (1834) ====
The occupation of the great city of Peshawar and its ruinous fort, the Bala Hisar was a reflection of Sardar Hari Singh Nalwa's formidable reputation in the region. Masson arrived in Peshawar just in time to see the Sikhs take control of the city. His eyewitness' account reports that the Afghans withdrew from the region and Hari Singh Nalwa occupied Peshawar without conflict.

==== Dost Mohammad Khan withdraws (1835) ====
Hari Singh Nalwa was the governor of Peshawar when Dost Mohammed personally came at the head of a large force to challenge the Sikhs. Following his victory against Shah Shuja at Kandahar, in the first quarter of 1834, Dost Mohammed declared himself padshah (king), gave a call for jihad and set off from Kabul to wrest Peshawar from the Sikhs. Ranjit Singh directed his generals to amuse the Afghans with negotiations and to win over Sultan Mohammed Khan. He directed them that on no account, even if attacked, were they to enter into a general engagement until his arrival.

Early skirmishes began in December 1834, which saw Akbar Khan, the son of Dost Mohammad Khan, fight engagements with different Sikh outposts, in one such engagement, defeating Hari Singh Nalwa, leaving around 150 Sikhs dead and wounded, and forcing him to withdraw to Peshawar.

Ranjit Singh chose intrigue rather than facing the Afghans in battle and began sending negotiation efforts to Dost Mohammad Khan. However, the true intentions of this were to divide Dost Mohammad Khan's supporters with bribes, prominently, Sultan Mohammad Khan. Josiah Harlan and Faqir Aziz were sent to the camp of Dost Mohammad, who plotted intrigue in the Afghan camp, including making some of his supporters and brothers jealous of the powerful position Dost Mohammad Khan held. This led to Sultan Mohammad's withdrawal from the camp at night with over 10,000 men, as this force defected to the Sikh camp. This sent the Afghan camp into disarray.

The French division under Jean-François Allard, Paolo Avitabile, Claude Auguste Court and Jean-Baptiste Ventura commanded 20 to 22,000 men who marched very slowly and suitably towards the left flank of Dost Mohammad Khan's army. The main Sikh army led by Hari Singh Nalwa, Gulab Singh, Misr Sukh Raj, Tej Singh, Attar Singh Sandhanwalia, Khushal Singh, Dhian Singh, Jawala Singh, Lehna Singh Majithia and Maharaja Ranjit Singh numbered 60–80,000 and approached Dost Mohammad Khan's center and right side.

Dost Mohammad Khan rejected a truce with the Sikhs. He withdrew at night with his troops and Ghazis, believing that he was being surrounded and having faced a bad omen with the stirrup of a horse, the Afghans withdrew and took all their ammunition and guns with them.

==== Battle of Michni ====
Once Hari Singh Nalwa was hunting in the area near Michni with 100 horsemen when a Hindu came up with a complaint about how Dela Khan of Michni had stolen his spouse. Later more Hindus came to tell Nalwa about the atrocities of the Khan. Learning about all of this Hari Singh Nalwa agreed to help the Hindus.

He along with his 100 horsemen attacked the Khan's residence in night. Dela Khan outnumbered him having an army of 5,000 but for the first half of the battle, he only fought with 500. There are 2 accounts of what happened next. The first one refers that Dela Khan was slain in the battle and later his son attacked the Sikhs with the rest of the army, who also died. The other one says that the Khan apologized and offered to return the bride, only to be punished.

The bride was returned to her husband and they both converted into the religion of Sikhism. The bride was Bibi Harsharan Kaur, a Sikh who was later important during Hari Singh Nalwa's martyr.

==== Jamrud (Khyber Pass) (1836) ====
In October 1836 following the Dussehra celebrations in Amritsar, Hari Singh made a sudden attack on the village of Jamrud, at the mouth of the Khyber Pass. The Misha Khel Khyberis, the owners of this village, were renowned for their excellent marksmanship and total lack of respect for any authority. Hari Singh Nalwa's first encounter with this tribe had taken place following the Battle of Nowshera when he had pursued the fleeing Azim Khan; and once again, when he chased Dost Mohammed Khan in 1835.

The occupation of Jamrud was rather strongly contested but it appeared that the place was taken by surprise. On its capture, Hari Singh Nalwa gave instructions to fortify the position without delay. A small existing fort was immediately put into repair. News of this event was immediately transmitted to Kabul. Masson informed Wade of the passage of events along this frontier in a letter dated 31 October 1836. With the conquest of Jamrud, at the very mouth of the Khyber, the frontier of the Sikh Empire now bordered the foothills of the Hindu Kush Mountains.

==== Panjtaar defeated (1836) ====
Hari Singh Nalwa accompanied by Kanwar Sher Singh, now proceeded towards the Yusafzai strongholds, north-east of Peshawar, which had withheld tribute for three years. The Sikhs defeated the Yusafzais, with their chief, Fateh Khan of Panjtar, losing his territory. It was reported that 15,000 mulkia fled before the Sikhs, many being killed and the remaining taking refuge in the hills. After burning and levelling Panjtar to the ground, Hari Singh returned to Peshawar realising all the arrears of revenue. Fateh Khan was obliged to sign an agreement to pay tribute on which condition Panjtar was released. When news of the conquest of Panjtar reached the Court of Lahore, a display of fireworks was proposed.

=== Battle of Jamrud (1837) ===
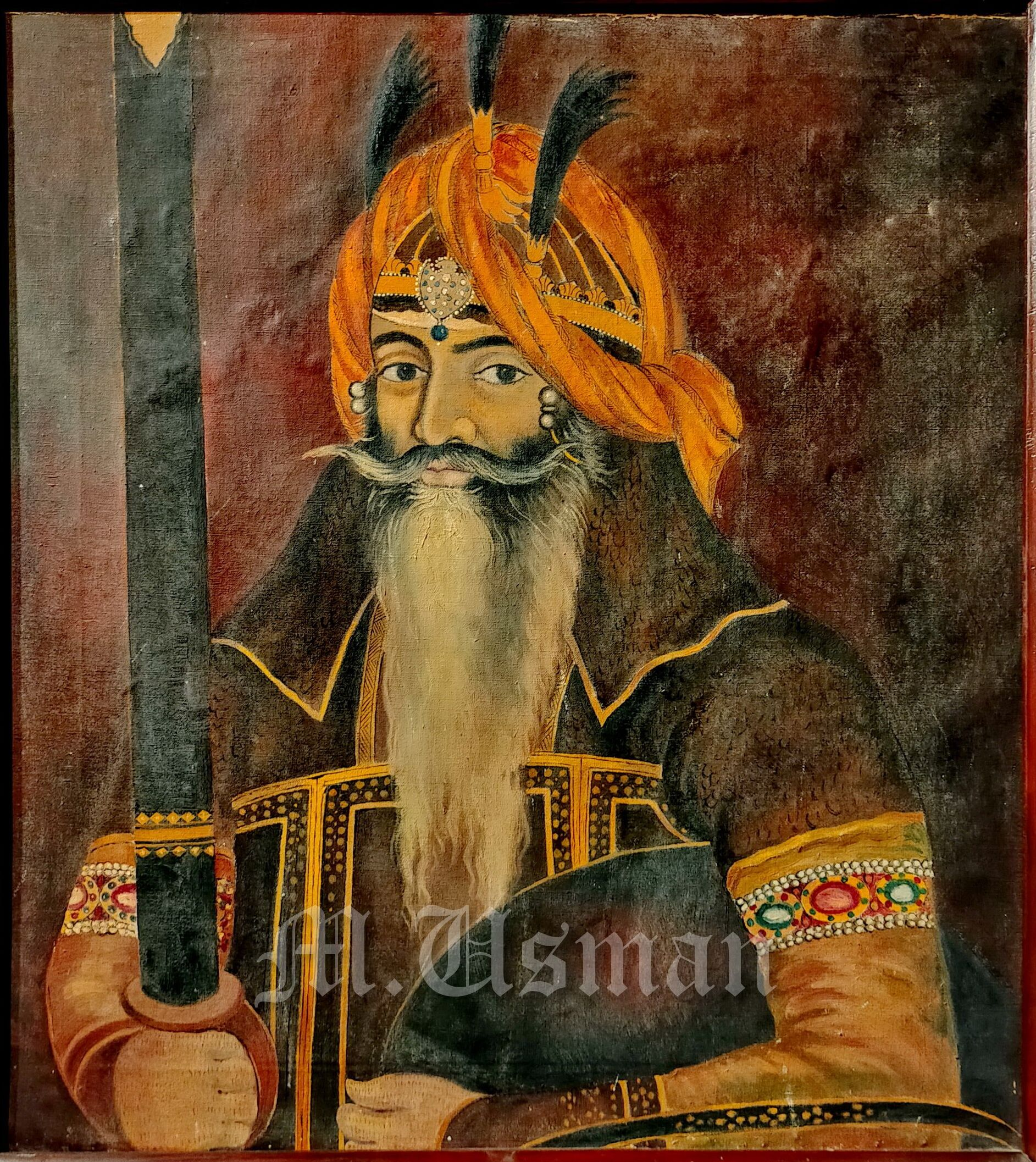
Oil painting of Hari Singh Nalwa displayed in the Lahore Museum

The Maharaja's grandson, Nau Nihal Singh was getting married in March 1837. Troops had been withdrawn from all over the Punjab to put up a show of strength for the British Commander-in-chief who was invited to the wedding. Dost Mohammed Khan had been invited to the great celebration. Hari Singh Nalwa too was supposed to be at Amritsar, but in reality was in Peshawar (some accounts say he was ill.) Dost Mohammed had ordered his army to march towards Jamrud together with five sons and his chief advisors with orders not to engage with the Sikhs, but more as a show of strength and try and wrest the forts of Shabqadar, Jamrud and Peshawar. Hari Singh had also been instructed not to engage with the Afghans till reinforcements arrived from Lahore. Hari Singh's lieutenant, Mahan Singh, was in the fortress of Jamrud with 600 men and limited supplies. Hari Singh was in the strong fort of Peshawar. He was forced to go to the rescue of his men who were surrounded from every side by the Afghan forces, without water in the small fortress. Before he died, he told his lieutenant not to let the news of his death out till the arrival of reinforcements, which is what he did. While the Afghans knew that Hari Singh had been wounded, they waited for over a week doing nothing, till the news of his death was confirmed. The Afghans withdrew after witnessing Nalwa's body hung outside the fort. Hari Singh Nalwa had not only defended Jamrud and Peshawar, but had prevented the Afghans from ravaging the entire north-west frontier, in turn was not able to invade Afghanistan himself. The loss of Hari Singh Nalwa was irreparable and this Sikh defeat was costly for that precise reason.

The victories in battles that were achieved over the Afghans, were a favourite topic of conversation for Ranjit Singh. He was to immortalise these by ordering a shawl from Kashmir at the record price of Rs 5000, in which were depicted the scenes of the battles fought with them. Following the death of Hari Singh Nalwa, no further conquests were made in this direction. The Khyber Pass continued as the Sikh frontier till the annexation of the Punjab by the British.

== Administrator ==
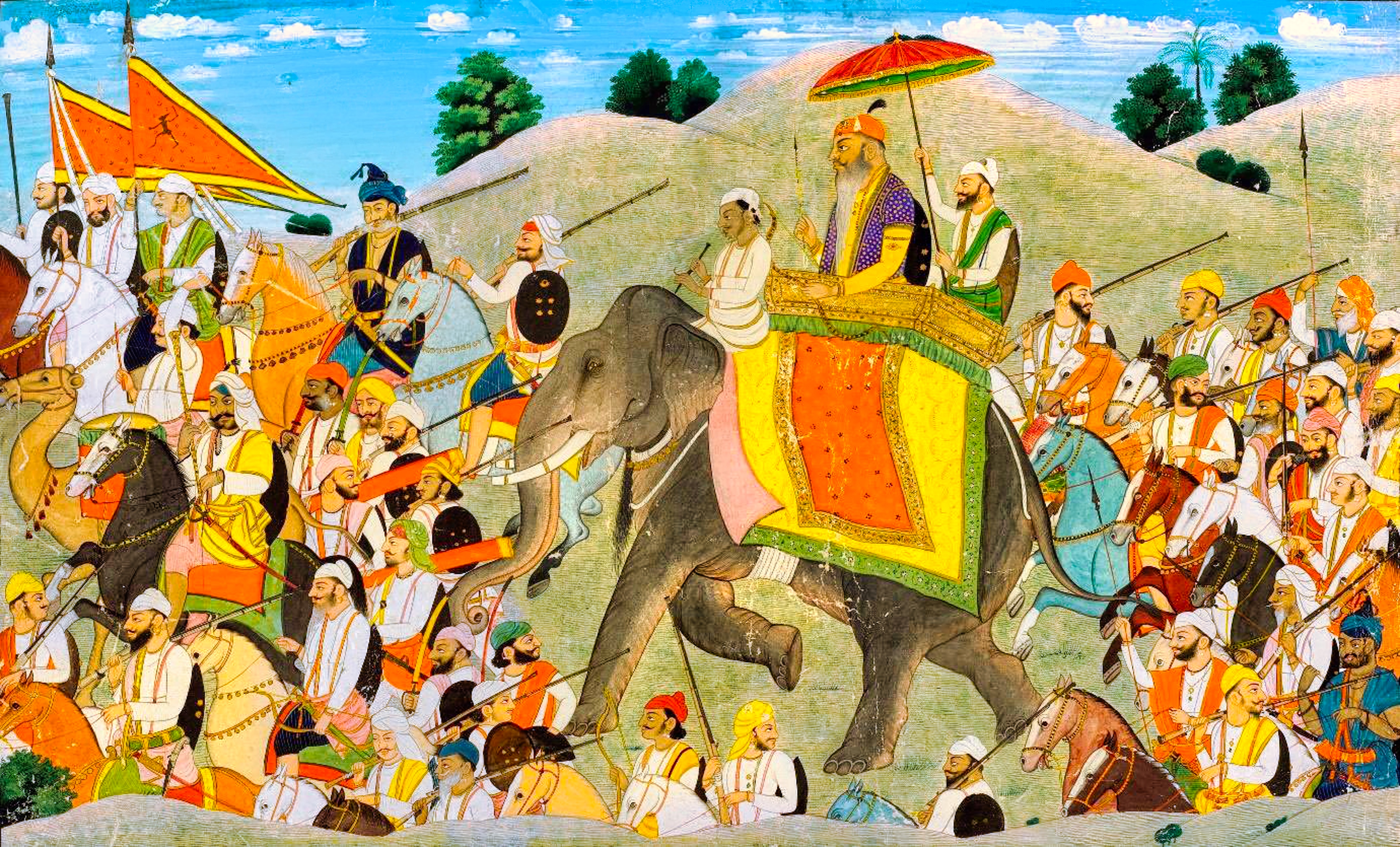
General Hari Singh Nalwa on an elephant with his retinue, ca.1825–35

Hari Singh's administrative rule covered one-third of the Sikh Empire. He served as the governor of Kashmir (1820–21), Greater Hazara (1822–1837) and was twice appointed the Governor of Peshawar (1834-5 & 1836–7). Mahan Singh, a Sikh Brahmin, was his 2nd in command on many affairs related to administration.

In his private capacity, Hari Singh Nalwa was required to administer his vast jagir spread all over the kingdom. He was sent to the most troublesome spots of the Sikh empire in order to "create a tradition of vigorous and efficient administration". The territories under his jurisdiction later formed part of the British Districts of Peshawar, Hazara (Pakhli, Damtaur, Haripur, Darband, Gandhgarh, Dhund, Karral and Khanpur), Attock (Chhachch, Hassan Abdal), Jehlum (Pindi Gheb, Katas), Mianwali (Kachhi), Shahpur (Warcha, Mitha Tiwana and Nurpur), Dera Ismail Khan (Bannu, Tank, and Kundi), Rawalpindi (Rawalpindi, Kallar) and Gujranwala. In 1832, at the specific request of William Bentinck, the Maharajah proposed a fixed table of duties for the whole of his territories. Sardar Hari Singh Nalwa was one of the three men deputed to fix the duties from Attock (on the Indus) to Filor (on the Satluj).

In Kashmir, however, Sikh rule was generally considered oppressive, protected perhaps by the remoteness of Kashmir from the capital of the Sikh empire in Lahore. The Sikhs enacted a number of anti-Muslim laws, which included handing out death sentences for cow slaughter, closing down the Jamia Masjid in Srinagar, and banning the azaan, the public Muslim call to prayer. Kashmir had also now begun to attract European visitors, several of whom wrote of the abject poverty of the vast Muslim peasantry and of the exorbitant taxes under the Sikhs.

The Sikh rule in lands dominated for centuries by Muslims was an exception in the political history of the latter. To be ruled by 'kafirs' was the worst kind of ignominy to befall a Muslim. Before the Sikhs came to Kashmir (1819 CE), the Afghans had ruled it for 67 years. For the Muslims, Sikh rule was the darkest period of the history of the place, while for the Kashmiri Pandits (Hindus) nothing was worse than the Afghan rule. The Sikh conquest of Kashmir was prompted by an appeal from its Hindu population. The oppressed Hindus had been subjected to forced conversions, their women raped, their temples desecrated, and cows slaughtered. Efforts by the Sikhs to keep peace in far-flung regions pressed them to close mosques and ban the call to prayer because the Muslim clergy charged the population to frenzy with a call for 'jihad' at every pretext. Cow-slaughter (Holy Cow) offended the religious sentiments of the Hindu population and therefore it met with capital punishment in the Sikh empire. In Peshawar, keeping in view "the turbulence of the lawless tribes ... and the geographical and political exigencies of the situation" Hari Singh's methods were most suitable.

== Diplomatic mission ==
In 1831, Hari Singh Nalwa was deputed to head a diplomatic mission to Lord William Bentinck, Governor-General of British India. The Ropar Meeting between Maharaja Ranjit Singh and the head of British India followed soon thereafter. The Maharaja saw this as a good occasion to get his son, Kharak Singh, acknowledged as his heir-apparent. Hari Singh Nalwa expressed strong reservations against any such move. The British desired to persuade Ranjit Singh to open the Indus for trade.

== Death ==
Hari Singh Nalwa Sahib was severely wounded while fighting the forces of Dost Mohammad Khan of Afghanistan. He died of his injuries and was cremated in the Jamrud Fort built at the mouth of the Khyber Pass in Khyber Pakhtunkhwa. According to Afghan chronicle Siraj al-Tawarikh, he was killed in a duel with Wazir Akbar Khan. According to historian Hari Ram Gupta, Hari Singh Nalwa rallied his men and rode to the front where he was struck by two bullets and later died after being rushed inside the fort. Babu Gajju Mall Kapur, a Hindu resident of Peshawar, commemorated his memory by building a memorial in the fort in 1892.

== Legacy ==
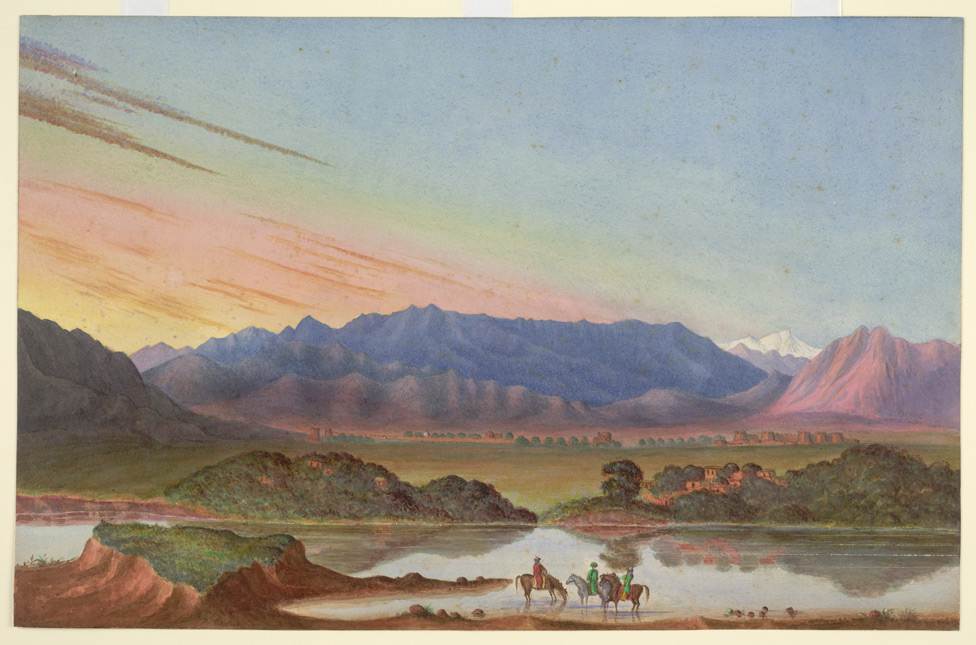
'The Rock Aornos from Huzara. From Nature by General James Abbott 1850'

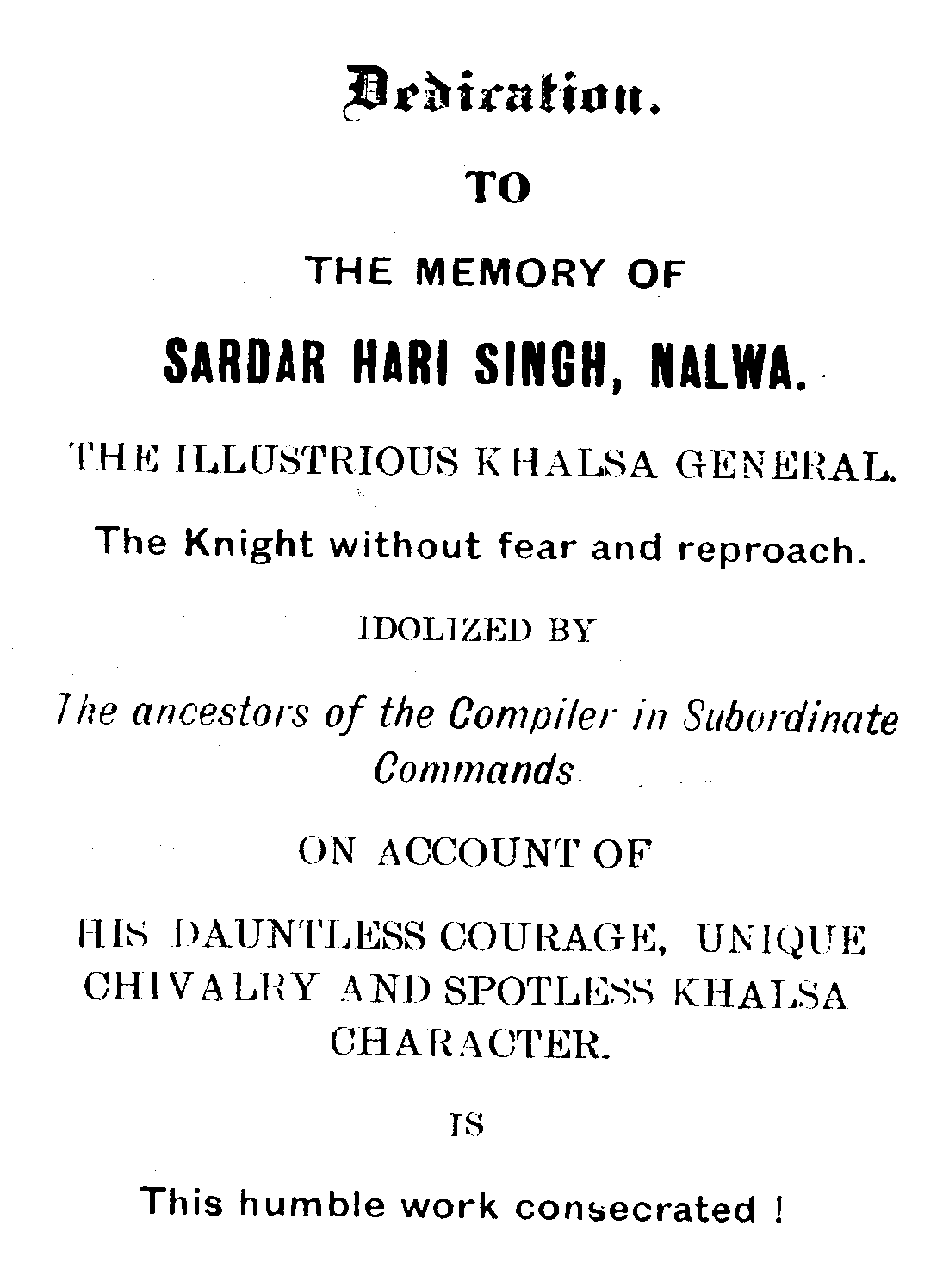
A tribute to the Champion of the Khalsaji. Hari Singh Nalwa's leadership qualities continued to inspire the Sikhs 81 years after his death (front page of a book published in 1918)

Nalwa was also a builder. At least 56 buildings were attributed to him, which included forts, ramparts, towers, gurdwaras, tanks, samadhis, temples, mosques, towns, havelis, sarais and gardens. He built the fortified town of Haripur in 1822. This was the first planned town in the region, with a superb water distribution system. His very strong fort of Harkishengarh, situated in the valley at the foothill of mountains, had four gates. It was surrounded by a wall, four yards thick and 16 yards high. Nalwa's presence brought such a feeling of security to the region that when Hügel visited Haripur in 1835–6, he found the town humming with activity. A large number of Khatris migrated there and established a flourishing trade. Haripur, tehsil and district, in Hazara, North-West Frontier Province, are named after him.

Nalwa contributed to the prosperity of Gujranwala, which he was given as a jagir sometime after 1799, which he held till his death in 1837.

He built all the main Sikh forts in the trans-Indus region of Khyber Pakhtunkhwa — Jehangira and Nowshera on the left and right bank respectively of the river Kabul, Sumergarh (or Bala Hisar Fort in the city of Peshawar), for the Sikh Kingdom. In addition, he laid the foundation for the fort of Fatehgarh, at Jamrud (Jamrud Fort). He reinforced Akbar's Attock fort situated on the left bank of the river Indus by building very high bastions at each of the gates. He also built the fort of Uri in Kashmir.

Nalwa's fighting legacy left such an impact on Afghanistan that Afghani mothers used his name to scare misbehaving children. They would reportedly say: ‘If you don’t stop crying, Haria Ragle (Hari Singh Nalwa) will turn up’.

A religious man, Nalwa built Gurdwara Panja Sahib in the town of Hassan Abdal, south-west of Haripur and north-west of Rawalpindi, to commemorate Guru Nanak's journey through that region. He had donated the gold required to cover the dome of the Akal Takht within the Harmandir Sahib complex in Amritsar.

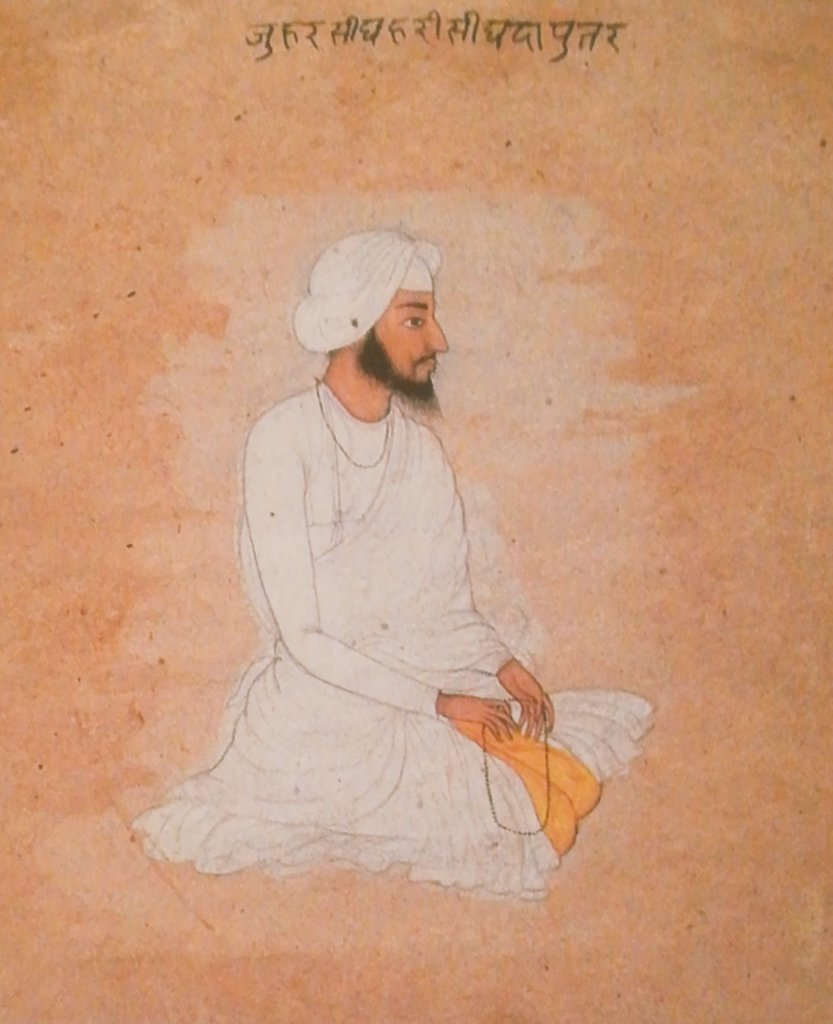
Jawahar Singh (son of Hari Singh Nalwa) reciting his prayers, Pahari-Sikh, ca.1840

Following Hari Singh Nalwa's death, his sons Jawahir Singh Nalwa and Arjan Singh Nalwa (Note: Sohan Lal Suri identifies Jawahir Singh Nalwa and Arjan Singh Nalwa.) fought against the British to protect the sovereignty of the Kingdom of the Sikhs, with the former being noted for his defence in the Battle of Chillianwala.

Abhinav Bindra, India's first individual Olympic Gold Medalist, is his 5th generation direct descendant.

== Popular culture ==
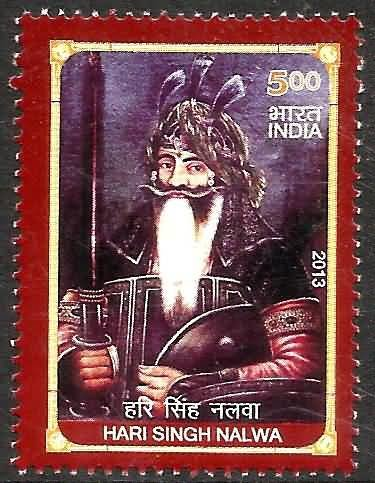
India Post's Stamp in 2013

Hari Singh Nalwa's life became a popular theme for martial ballads. His earliest biographers were poets, including Qadir Bakhsh urf Kadaryar, Misr Hari Chand urf Qadaryaar and Ram Dayal, all in the 19th century.

In the 20th century, the song Mere Desh Ki Dharti from the 1967 Bollywood film Upkaar eulogises him in the line when the hero exclaims, Rang Hara Hari Singh Nalwe se. Amar Chitra Katha first published the biography of Hari Singh Nalwa in 1978 (see List of Amar Chitra Katha comics).

On 30 April 2013 the Indian Minister of Communications Kapil Sibal released a commemorative postage stamp honouring Hari Singh, marking the 176th anniversary of his death.

Hari Singh Nalwa Champion of the Khalsaji 1791–1837, a biography by Vanit Nalwa – a direct descendant of the general – was published in 2009. It is being adapted into an Indian feature film by Prabhleen Kaur of Almighty Motion Picture.

Hari Singh Nalwa is the subject of Punjabi singer Sidhu Moose Wala's song, Vaar. The song was released on November 8, 2022, to align with the 553rd birth anniversary of Guru Nanak. The song marked Sidhu's second posthumous release, and garnered 1.5 million YouTube views within the first 30 minutes of its release.

In September 2023, a depiction of Hari Singh Nalwa was imprinted on official sweater merchandise of the Dallas Cowboys football team as part of the Carpe Omnia ('seize everything') theme for the upcoming sports season.

== See also ==
- Bajirao
- Banda Singh Bahadur
