= Battle of Ramkani =

1835 battle between Afghans and Sikhs

- Part of the Afghan–Sikh Wars
Date	4 May 1835
Location	Ramkani near Nowshera
Result	Sikh victory: Afghan withdrawal

Belligerents
Sikh Empire	(Afghanistan) Barakzais; Assisted by Ghazis

Commanders and leaders
Ranjit Singh; Misr Raj	Unknown

Strength
Unknown	3,000-4,000

Casualties and losses
Unknown	Unknown

The Battle of Ramkani was fought on 4 May 1835 by the Sikh forces led by Maharaja Ranjit Singh and Barakzai forces including Ghazis.

== Background ==
In the beginning of 1835, Dost Mohammad Khan mobilized 40,000 Afghans, alongside 37 cannons to reclaim Peshawar, which was a part of the Sikh territory after the capture of Peshawar.

== Battle ==
At Ramkani, 3,000-4,000 Ghazis and Barakzais came to check Ranjit Singh's advance. A fierce battle lasted for 12 hours at Ramkani. The enemy waged guerilla warfare, which made Ranjit Singh fight a defensive battle. The Afghans however decided to withdraw during the night. Misr Sukh Raj played a role of bravery which made him earn 10,000 rupees yearly by the Maharaja.

== Aftermath ==
After this battle, the Sikhs entered the city of Peshawar and Sultan Mohammad Khan, the ruler of the city allied up with the Maharaja already. The Maharaja also wanted to ally up with Dost Mohammad Khan and upon Dost Mohammad's refusal, both sides began preparing for war, leading to the standoff at the Khyber pass.

== See also ==
- Nihang
- Martyrdom and Sikhism
