= Battle of Mangal =

1821 battle of the Afghan–Sikh Wars

- Part of the Afghan–Sikh Wars
Date	10 November 1821
Location	Mangli, Khyber Pakhtunkhwa Province (Pakistan)
Result	Sikh victory

Belligerents
Sikh Empire	Jadoon; Tareen; Awan

Commanders and leaders
Hari Singh Nalwa	Bostan Khan; Muhammad Awan

Strength
7,000	25,000

Casualties and losses
1500	2,000 killed

The Battle of Mangal was fought between the Sikh forces led by Hari Singh Nalwa and the Jadoon, led by Muhammad Khan

== Background and Battle ==
Maharaja Ranjit Singh deployed Hari Singh Nalwa. He marched by Muzaffarabad and Pakhli with 7,000 foot soldiers under his command. When he reached Mangal, around 25,000 Pashtun and Hazara troops and their leader, Muhammad Khan Tarin, who opposed the Sikh's passage, attacked the Sikhs. Despite being outnumbered, the Sikhs defeated their opponents with a loss of 2,000 men.

== Aftermath ==
The Jaduns to save their town paid down a fine of 5 and a half rupees per house to the Sikhs. Hari Singh Nalwa then built a fort at Nawanshahr. The Maharaja, partly pleased with the treasures and partly to reward his lieutenant for the victory, made Hari Singh Nalwa the governor of the entirety of Hazara.

== See also ==
- Nihang
- Martyrdom and Sikhism
