= Battle of Kasur =

Battle in the Afghan–Sikh Wars

Battle of Kasur (1807)
- Part of the Afghan–Sikh Wars
Date	10 February 1807
Location	Kasur, Punjab, Pakistan 31°7′0″N 74°27′0″E
Result	Sikh victory
Territorial changes	Kasur became part of Sikh Empire

Belligerents
Sikh Empire	Durrani Empire

Commanders and leaders
Ranjit Singh; Jodh Singh; Hari Singh	Qutub ud Din

Strength
10,000	Unknown

Casualties and losses
3000	200 captured

The battle of Kasur took place on 10 February 1807 between the Sikh Empire and the Afghan-appointed governor of Kasur, and was a part of the Afghan–Sikh Wars.

== Battle ==
The battle was led by maharaja Ranjit Singh and Jodh Singh Ramgarhia as Kasur had been a long thorn in the side of Ranjit Singh's power due to its proximity to his capital city of Lahore. The battle was also Hari Singh's first significant participation in a Sikh conquest by assuming charge of an independent contingent in 1807. After the defeat, Qutb ud-Din of Kasur took refuge in the Kasur Fort. The siege continued for a month, which saw bombardment and skirmishes. Finally Phula Singh and his nihangs made a breach into the walls of fort, and Kasur fell to the Sikhs. Qutb ud-Din was captured but was given a small jagir at Mamdot. During the campaign, Hari Singh Nalwa showed remarkable bravery and dexterity. and as a result, was granted a jagir in recognition of his services.

After the victory Kasur was annexed into Sikh Empire in March 1807.

== See also ==
- Siege of Multan (1818)
