= Gurmukh Singh (First World War) =

Gurmukh Singh Saini
- Military career
- Allegiance: British India
- Branch: British Indian Army
- Rank: Jemadar
- Conflicts: First World War
- Awards: Indian Order of Merit, 1st Class; Cross of St. George, 3rd Class (Russia)

Gurmukh Singh, IOM was a Sikh soldier from the village Gadram Badi of Ropar in district Ambala of the province of Punjab in British India. Saini won the Indian Order of Merit 1st Class during the First World War for splendid courage on the battlefield on the night of 1 March 1916. He was also awarded Imperial Russia's highest exclusively military award for gallantry in the face of enemy, the Cross of St. George. According to the January 1919 Indian Army List Gurmukh Singh enlisted 19 March 1904 and was a Naik in the 3rd Sappers and Miners when on the 2 March 1916 he was awarded the IOM 1st class. He was later awarded The Cross of St. George, 3rd class according to Honours and awards, Indian Army 1914–21. He was commissioned Jemadar 1 September 1917, and was still serving in 1923 according to the April 1923 Indian Army List.

== Award of the Indian Order of Merit: Lieutenant-Governor's Citation ==
Gurmukh Singh Saini won the Indian Order of Merit, 1st Class for his gallantry during the First World War. He held the rank of jemadar. Sir Michael O'Dwyer, Lieutenant-Governor of the Punjab in British India, read the following citation in his speech regarding Gurmukh Singh's "splendid courage" and "heroism" on the battlefield:

...the Sikhs have so far won all the 18 military honours awarded to men of the Ambala District during this war. I will give you here the names of three of those men who have earned fame by their heroism. Jemadar Gurmukh Singh, a Saini Sikh of Gadram Badi in Rupar, won the 1st Class Order of Merit and the 2nd Class Cross of the Russian Order of St. George for his splendid courage on the night of the 1st March 1916 when he advanced under the greatest difficulties, continually crawling forward and digging himself in...

== See also ==
- Subedar Joginder Singh Sahnan – PVC winner
- Gurbachan Singh Salaria – PVC Winner
