= Bostan Khan =

Tareen warrior (died 1825)

Bostan Khan (died 1825), was a warrior of the Tareen (or Tarin) tribe settled in the Haripur, Hazara region of what was to later become the North-West Frontier Province (now Khyber Pakhtunkhwa, Pakistan), who was executed for rebellion by the Sikh Empire administrators of the region at that time.

== Biography ==
Bostan Khan was the nephew of the Tareen clan's chief of that time, Sardar Muhammad Khan. After Sardar Muhammad Khan was captured for rebelling against the Sikh Empire government of Lahore, in year 1824-25, he was arrested and later executed. After Sardar Muhammad Khan Tareen's capture, his nephew, Sardar Bostan Khan, resumed the freedom struggle and went into rebellion against the Sikh administrators. A small garrison fort in Sirikot in Gandgarh district was attacked and taken by the rebels under Bostan Khan. In 1825, Bostan Khan and others were captured and executed by Sardar Hari Singh Nalwa. Late, Sardar Muhammad Khan Tareen's son, Sardar Ghulam Khan, became chief of the Tareen clan in this region from 1826 to 1848. During the Second Anglo-Sikh War, he was arrested by the British and taken to Allahabad jail, and later hanged there.
