= Gurmukh Singhwala =

- Village
- Location in Punjab, India Gurmukh Singhwala (India)
- Coordinates: 31.489705°N 75.293111°E
- Country: India
- State: Punjab
- District: Kapurthala

Government
  - Type: Panchayati raj (India)
  - Body: Gram panchayat

Population (2011)
  - Total: 23
- Sex ratio 12/11♂/♀

Languages
  - Official: Punjabi
  - Other spoken: Hindi
- Time zone: UTC+5:30 (IST)
- PIN: 144804
- Telephone code: 01822
- ISO 3166 code: IN-PB
- Vehicle registration: PB-09
- Website: kapurthala.gov.in

Gurmukh Singhwala is a village in Kapurthala district of Punjab State, India. It is located 17 kilometres (11 mi) from Kapurthala, which is both district and sub-district headquarters of Gurmukh Singhwala. The village is administered by a Sarpanch who is an elected representative of village as per the constitution of India and Panchayati raj (India).

== Demography ==
According to the report published by Census India in 2011, Gurmukh Singhwala has total number of 5 houses and population of 23 of which include 12 males and 11 females. Literacy rate of Gurmukh Singhwala is 91.30%, higher than state average of 75.84%. The population of children under the age of 6 years is 0 which is 0.00% of total population of Gurmukh Singhwala, and child sex ratio is approximately 0, lower than state average of 846.

== Population data ==
Particulars	Total	Male	Female
Total No. of Houses	5	-	-
Population	23	12	11
Child (0-6)	0	0	0
Schedule Caste	0	0	0
Schedule Tribe	0	0	0
Literacy	91.30 %	91.67 %	90.91 %
Total Workers	8	7	1
Main Worker	7	0	0
Marginal Worker	1	1	0

== Air travel connectivity ==
The closest airport to the village is Sri Guru Ram Dass Jee International Airport.
