= Nawabs of Mankera =

Dynasty in north-western Punjab, Pakistan

- 1772–1839
- Flag

- Sadozai Kingdom of Mankera at its greatest extent
- Capital: Mankera (1772-1821); Dera Ismail Khan (1821–1839)
- Common languages: Official language Persian
- Religion: Islam
- Government: Absolute Monarchy
- History
  - Death of Ahmad Shah Abdali: 1772
  - Nau Nihal Singh's Annexation of Dera Ismail Khan: 1839

The Nawabs of Mankera was an influential princely state or chieftaincy centered in Mankera. It had strategic importance during the late Mughal, Durrani, and early Sikh periods. In the mid-1700s, Ahmad Shah Durrani, the founder of the Durrani Empire, granted control of Mankera and surrounding areas to Nawab Sarbuland Khan, a Sadozai noble. The Nawabs of Mankera established a semi-independent principality, loyal to the Durrani Empire but ruled autonomously. The Sadozai Nawabs of Mankera ruled over large areas of western Punjab, including parts of Dera Ismail Khan, Layyah, Bhakkar, and Mianwali, during the late 18th and early 19th centuries. Their capital was the fortified city of Mankera.

== History ==
Initially the Nawabs of Mankera were governors of the Sindh Sagar Doab under the Durrani Shahs of Afghanistan. However, with the death of Ahmad Shah Durrani in 1772, it along with several other polities of Punjab became independent. The state was founded by Nawab Sarbuland Khan Sadozai, who was succeeded by his son-in-law, Nawab Ahmad Khan Sadozai and his progeny. The state comprised much of the Sindh-Sagar Doab, corresponding the modern districts of Mianwali, Bhakkar, Layyah as well as the south-western districts of Khyber Pakhtunkhwa below Kohat including Dera Ismail Khan. It was conquered by the Sikh Empire in 1822 after the siege of Mankera.

== Rulers ==
Nawab Sarbuland Khan Sadozai (1772-1815)

Nawab Hafiz Ahmad Khan Sadozai (1815- )

Nawab Muhammad Khan Sadozai (-1839)

Nawab Sher Muhammad Khan Sadozai (-1855)

Nawab Sarfraz Khan Sadozai

Nawab Allah Dad Khan Sadozai (-1910)

Nawab Sir Ahmed Nawaz Khan Sadozai (-1958)

Nawab Allah Nawaz Khan Sadozai (-1990), Last Nawab.

Honorary Nawabzada Dr Aman Ullah Khan (son in law/Nephew) (1990-1996)

Honorary Nawabzada Dr Ahsaan Ullah Khan
