= 1803 anti-Shia riots in Kabul =

1803 Anti-Shia riots in Kabul
- Part of Afghan Civil War (1793–1823)
Date	June – July 1803
Location	Kabul (Chindawol & Bala Hissar), Durrani Empire
Result	Riot suppressed by Durrani Empire

Belligerents
Sunni coalition of Kabul; Followers of Sher Mohammad Khan Bamizai; Followers of Mirwais (Khwaja Khanji); Sunni mobs from Kabul Shahar and Bazar; Ghilji tribes; Safi tribes; Kohistanis; Logaris; Forces loyal to Shuja Shah Durrani	Anti-riot faction; Forces of the Durrani Empire; Hazara tribes; Qizilbash militia

Commanders and leaders
Shuja Shah Durrani; Sher Mohammad Khan; Sayyid Mir Ahmad Agha; Sardar Ahmad Khan	Mahmud Shah Durrani; Fateh Khan Barakzai; Jawansher Qizilbash leadership

Strength
Kabul mobs: Several thousand; Kohistan, Logar, Tagab reinforcements: 20,000; Tribal levies (Ghilji, Safi): several thousand	Qizilbash defenders in Chindawol: Well-armed urban militia; Fateh Khan’s returning army: 10,000 Hazaras

Casualties and losses
Hundreds killed	Hundreds killed
- Estimated 400+ total dead

The 1803 anti-Shia riots in Kabul was a major sectarian uprising in the Durrani capital of Kabul, instigated by radical Sunni clerics and tribal levies against the Qizilbash population of Kabul's Chindawol quarter. The violence evolved into a full-scale siege of the Qizilbash mahalla and pushed Kabul into factional collapse, accelerating the political downfall of Mahmud Shah Durrani, and reshaping power dynamics across the Durrani state.

== Prelude ==
The trigger was the fall of Mashhad to a Persian army in mid-1803. Although the event had little practical effect on Durrani rule, Sunni clerics in Kabul used the loss as a pretext to target the Qizilbash, whose political influence had grown sharply since the Jawansher clan helped install Mahmud Shah Durrani on the throne. Their marriage alliances with the Barakzai elite most notably the ties between Payandah Khan’s line and Musa Khan Jawansher’s family deepened resentment among conservative Durrani nobles.

By the early 1800s the Jawanshir Qizilbash functioned as a semi-autonomous political bloc inside Kabul, armed, entrenched in Chindawol, and indispensable to the survival of Mahmud Shah’s regime. Their power fed xenophobia and sectarian hostility among Durrani elites, who saw the Qizilbash as foreign, Shi‘a, and politically overgrown.

Sher Mohammad Khan Bamizai, the Mukhtar al-Daula and a long-time enemy of the Qizilbash, used the moment to rally Kabul’s Sunni clergy. He aligned with Sayyid Mir Ahmad Agha known to his followers as Khwaja Khanji head preacher of the Pul-e Khishti Mosque and custodian of the Ashiqan wa Arifan shrine. Together they built an anti-Shi‘a coalition capable of challenging the throne itself.

== Riot and Attack on the Qizilbash ==
In early June 1803, while Fateh Khan and much of the Qizilbash were away suppressing a revolt in Kandahar, Sher Mohammad Khan publicly branded all Shi‘as as heretics and accused Payandah Khan’s family of defiling the Sunni order through marriage ties with “heretics.” His sermons lit the fuse, and violent clashes broke out across Kabul.

A funeral procession for a Sunni youth executed after killing a Qizilbash in a street quarrel became the first flashpoint. As the crowd claimed they were fired on by Qizilbash sentries, anger exploded. Another story circulating in Kabul told of Qizilbash commanders abducting and assaulting a boy, a rumor that drove the mobs into a frenzy. With tensions maxed out, Mukhtar al-Daula issued a formal fatwa of jihad against the Qizilbash.

On the next Friday, Khwaja Khanji read the fatwa aloud at Pul-e Khishti Mosque. The congregation surged out of the mosque ready for blood. Houses of Shi‘a families were sacked, fires lit, and armed mobs swarmed toward Chindawol.

=== Siege of Chindawol ===
When Mahmud Shah refused to crack down on the rioters and instead hid inside the Bala Hissar Sher Mohammad Khan and Khwaja Khanji pulled in massive tribal reinforcements, Several thousand Kabul mobs, 20,000 men from Kohistan, Logar, and Tagab, Several thousand Ghilzai and Safi tribesmen. This force ringed Chindawol and launched repeated assaults. The Qizilbash, however, were ready. Their fortified mahalla had thick walls, elevated firing positions, and arms stockpiled precisely for this scenario. Well-aimed volleys cut down hundreds of attackers. The besiegers pushed artillery and sharpshooters onto the Sher Darwaza heights overlooking the quarter, turning the fight into a grinding siege. The standoff dragged on for nearly a month. Over 400 people died; mobs, tribesmen, Qizilbash defenders, and bystanders turning Kabul into a battlefield.

== Rebellion and Collapse ==
Mahmud Shah’s attempt to arrest the clerical ringleaders backfired when Sher Mohammad Khan slipped out of Kabul and urged Khwaja Khanji to escalate the crisis. The clerics mobilized more fighters and launched diversionary attacks against both Chindawol and the Bala Hisar, isolating the king even further. Fateh Khan, returning from the south with 10,000 Hazara troops of Bamiyan, finally broke the stalemate. He threw his forces behind the Qizilbash and smashed through the besiegers, scattering the mobs and forcing the tribal levies to retreat. The same intervention that saved the Qizilbash also triggered a political backlash. Kabul’s elite accused Mahmud Shah of siding with “heretics.” Sher Mohammad Khan, Mirwais, and Ahmad Khan Nurzai regrouped and plotted to overthrow the king. Their alliance invited Shah Shuja back into the struggle for the throne.

== Aftermath ==
The riots fatally weakened Mahmud Shah’s authority. Sher Mohammad Khan and his partners continued agitating until they helped bring Shah Shuja to Kabul at the head of 150,000 men. When Fateh Khan returned to defend Mahmud Shah, much of his army defected under the pressure of the anti-Qizilbash narrative. Mahmud Shah's position collapsed, paving the way for his eventual dethronement in 1805. For the Qizilbash, the events confirmed both their military value and the deep hostility they faced inside Kabul. Chindawol's fortifications were strengthened after the riots, as the Jawanshir community realized that sectarian violence could erupt again at any moment. The 1803 riots stand as one of the bloodiest internal sectarian clashes in early Afghan state history, a mix of tribal opportunism, clerical incitement, and political warfare disguised as religious purity.
