= List of Durrani Wazirs =

List of Viziers of the Durrani Empire 1747-1823/1839-1842

Wazir of the Durrani Empire
- Seal of Ahmad Shah Durrani
- Style: Wazir
- Appointer: The Shah
- Formation: 1747
- First holder: Shah Wali Khan
- Final holder: Fateh Khan Barakzai
- Abolished: 1823
- Succession: List of Wazirs of the Emirate of Afghanistan

This article lists the Wazirs of the Durrani Empire beginning from its rise in 1747 and ending with the empire's fall in 1823. The list also includes the brief interlude of Shah Shujah Durrani from 1839 to 1842.

== History ==
The Durrani Empire was formed in 1747 following the death of Nader Shah. The empire was founded by Ahmad Shah Durrani, who began expanding the empire in all directions. Ahmad Shah would expand into Khorasan, Punjab, and India. During this period of time, they would establish Wazirs, similar to the Ottoman Empire. Wazirs would often change with different rulers, especially during the succession crisis amongst Timur Shah Durrani's sons. The killing of Wazir Fateh Khan by Mahmud Shah Durrani led to the collapse of the Durrani Empire. Shah Shuja Durrani would be restored in 1839 in the First Anglo-Afghan War, but he was eventually deposed and killed in 1842.

== Wazirs ==
Wazir		Term of office			Shah
Portrait	Epithet Name (Birth-Death)	Took office	Left office	Time in office	Shah
	Shah Wali Khan شاه والی خان (d. 1772)	1747	1772	25 years	Ahmad Shah Durrani (1747–1772)
	Shah Wali Khan شاه والی خان (d. 1772)	1747	1772	25 years	Timur Shah Durrani (1772–1793)
	Hajji Jamal Khan حاجی جمال خان بارکزی (1719–1772)	1772	1772	1 year	Timur Shah Durrani (1772–1793)
	Rahimdad Khan رحیمداد خان (?)	1772	1774	2 years	Timur Shah Durrani (1772–1793)
	Payandah Khan پاینده خان بارکزی (1758–1800)	1774	1793	19 years	Timur Shah Durrani (1772–1793)
	Wafadar Khan وفادار خان (d. 1801)	1793	1801	8 years	Zaman Shah Durrani (1793–1801)
	Fateh Khan Barakzai فتح خان بارکزی (1777–1818)	1801	1803	2 years	Mahmud Shah Durrani First reign (1801–1803)
	Mukhtar al-Daula مختار الدوله (d. 1808)	1803	1808	5 years	Shah Shuja Durrani (1803–1809)
	Akram Khan اکرم خان (d. 1809)	1808	1809	1 year	Shah Shuja Durrani (1803–1809)
	Fateh Khan Barakzai فتح خان بارکزی (1777–1818)	1809	1818	9 years	Mahmud Shah Durrani Second reign (1809–1818)
	Civil war جنگ داخلی (1818–1823)	1818	1823	5 years	Civil war (Civil war)
	Mullah Shakar ملا شکر (?)	1839	1840	1 year	Shah Shuja Durrani Second reign (1839–1842)
	Mohammad Osman Khan محمد عثمان خان (1798–1865)	1840	1842	2 years	Shah Shuja Durrani Second reign (1839–1842)

== See also ==
- List of heads of state of Afghanistan
- Durrani Empire
- Vizier
