= Battle of Nimla (1809) =

Durrani Civil Wars after the death of Timur Shah

- Part of Afghan Civil War (1793–1823)
Date	29 June 1809
Location	Kabul-Jalalabad Road
Result	Mahmud coalition victory
Territorial changes	Durrani Empire usurped by Shah Mahmud

Belligerents
Coalition of Shah Mahmud	Durrani Empire

Commanders and leaders
Mahmud Shah Durrani; Kamran Shah Durrani; Fateh Khan Barakzai; Dost Mohammad Khan	Shah Shuja Durrani; Akram Khan †; Abd al-Ghafur †

Strength
~4,000	~3,000

Casualties and losses
Unknown, believed to be light	Unknown, believed to be heavy

The Battle of Nimla took place on 29 June 1809, due to a conflict between Mahmud Shah Durrani and Shah Shuja Durrani over the succession for the Afghan Durrani throne. The battle resulted in a victory for Mahmud Shah and allowed him to secure the throne, where he reigned from 1809 to 1818. This was his second reign before he was deposed.

At the beginning of the conflict, Shah Shuja had managed to depose Mahmud Shah in the wake of a greater conflict that had spilled over after the death of Timur Shah Durrani, leading to a succession crisis where Mahmud Shah would eventually take rule, and be deposed by Shah Shuja, as a result, Mahmud Shah had returned in 1809 and had occupied Kabul, Shah Shuja had rallied his forces near Jalalabad to meet Shah Mahmud in battle near Nimla.

== Background ==
Following the death of Timur Shah Durrani, the Durrani Empire was plunged into a succession crisis with Timur Shah's 24 sons. Prominent among these sons were Mahmud Shah Durrani, Zaman Shah Durrani, and Shah Shuja Durrani. Zaman Shah Durrani would take the throne after the death of Timur Shah in a succession crisis, where Mahmud Shah Durrani was confined to ruling the Realm of Herat, while Shah Shuja would work for Zaman Shah ordinated at Peshawar. Mahmud Shah would be forced to flee to Persia after Zaman Shah would invade Herat. Mahmud Shah returned in multiple attempts to seize the throne from his brother, finally succeeding in 1801. Shah Shuja Durrani attempted to thwart Mahmud Shah's attempts, but was repelled and forced to flee.

Shah Shuja would return with rebel leader Sher Muhammad Khan to topple Mahmud Shah and would succeed, placing himself on the throne in 1803, making Mahmud Shah's reign last just under 2 years.

== Battle ==
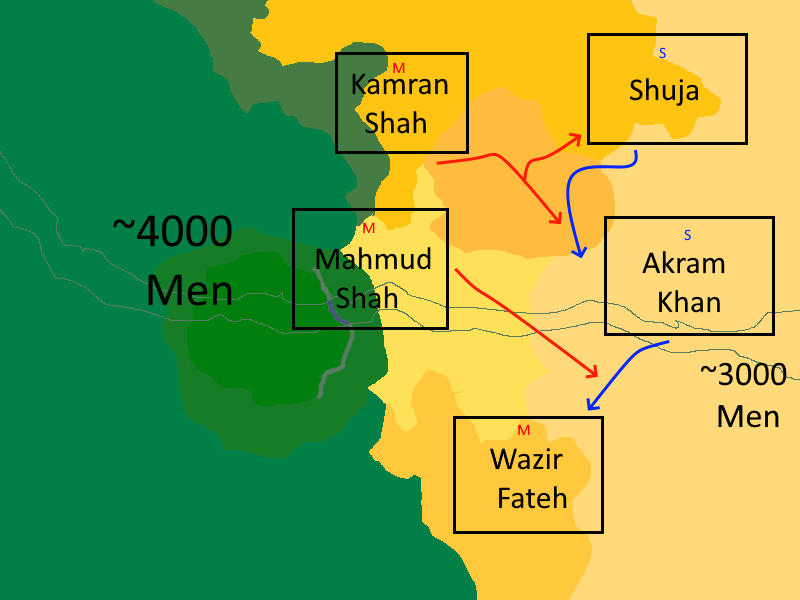
Depicted battle of Nimla

== Aftermath ==
With this victory, Mahmud Shah Durrani was able to usurp and secure the Durrani throne, starting his second reign on the Durrani Empire. Mahmud Shah Durrani reigned until his second deposition in 1818.
