= Battle of Attock (1813) =

1813 battle during the Afghan-Sikh Wars

- Part of the Afghan–Sikh wars
Date	9 or 13 July 1813 (Note: Sources differ on the date of the main engagement. Hari Ram Gupta gives 9 July 1813, while Ganda Singh and Balwant Singh Dhillon give 13 July 1813.)
Location	Chhachh plain near Haidru, Attock, on the Indus River
Result	Sikh victory
Territorial changes	Attock Fort annexed by the Sikh Empire

Belligerents
Sikh Empire	Durrani Empire

Commanders and leaders
Dewan Mokham Chand; Hari Singh Nalwa; Desa Singh Majithia	Fateh Khan Barakzai (WIA); Dost Mohammad Khan (WIA)

Strength
Relief army: 10,000 horse and foot, with several cannon	15,000 men

Casualties and losses
Unknown	Estimates vary: 2,000–3,000 killed and wounded

The Battle of Attock (also called the Battle of Haidru or the Battle of Chuch) was fought near the fort of Attock on the Indus River between the Sikh Empire under Maharaja Ranjit Singh and the Durrani forces of Kabul led by Fateh Khan Barakzai. The battle resulted in a decisive Sikh victory and the permanent capture of the fort of Attock, which commanded the principal crossing of the Indus. It was the first pitched battle between the Sikhs and Afghans.

The fort of Attock with its 134 surrounding villages was incorporated into the Sikh Empire after a negotiated surrender in March 1813, but Fateh Khan Barakzai refused to accept the loss and mounted a campaign to recover it. The subsequent siege of Attock and the relief expedition under Dewan Mokham Chand culminated in a battle on the plains of Chhachh near the village of Haidru. The victory confirmed the effectiveness of the military reforms Ranjit Singh had introduced and opened the way for Sikh expansion across the Indus toward Peshawar and the Khyber Pass.

== Background ==
=== Durrani possessions and decline ===
In the second half of the eighteenth century, Ahmad Shah Durrani held eight territories in north-western India: the provinces of Peshawar, Attock, Kashmir, Lahore, Sirhind, Multan, Sind and the state of Bahawalpur. Sikh sardars captured Lahore and Sirhind during the period of Durrani decline, and Multan remained in Sikh occupation from 1771 to 1779 before being recovered by Ahmad Shah's son Timur Shah Durrani. The other territories continued to be governed by Afghan nobles appointed from Kandahar and Kabul.

Ahmad Shah died in 1772. Timur Shah kept the remaining Durrani kingdom intact until his death in 1793, after which his several sons by different wives began to quarrel among themselves and the kingdom descended into confusion and anarchy. The weak rule of Shah Zaman (1793–1800), the languishing reign of Mahmud Shah Durrani (1800), and the indolence of Shah Shuja Durrani (1803) accelerated the decline. Mahmud Shah regained the throne in 1809 and entrusted full control of his government to his Wazir, Fateh Khan Barakzai.

Shah Shuja fled to India after losing the throne. Jahandad Khan, the Durrani governor of Attock, captured him and sent him to his brother Ata Muhammad Khan, the governor of Kashmir. Both brothers were sons of the late Wazir Sher Muhammad Khan and grandsons of Shah Vali Khan Bamzai, the famous Wazir of Ahmad Shah Durrani. They refused to submit to the Barakzai Wazir Fateh Khan and paid no tribute to Mahmud Shah. Kashmir was the richest province of the Durrani kingdom, and Fateh Khan was determined to seize Ata Muhammad Khan's accumulated hoard and entrust the province to his own brother Azim Khan. With the collaboration of Ranjit Singh, he succeeded in expelling Ata Muhammad Khan from Kashmir.

=== Sikh expansion under Ranjit Singh ===
Ranjit Singh became the ruler of Lahore in 1799 and rapidly consolidated his authority over the Sikh misls of the Punjab. He captured Amritsar in 1802 and extended his control over the territories between the Sutlej and the Indus through a combination of military force and diplomacy. By 1809, he had signed the Treaty of Amritsar with the British East India Company, which fixed the Sutlej as the boundary between British and Sikh territory. This agreement blocked further Sikh expansion eastward and turned Ranjit Singh's ambitions toward the west and north-west.

Ranjit Singh devoted considerable attention to modernising his army. He employed European mercenaries, including former soldiers of the East India Company, to train his infantry and artillery along European lines. His regular regiments, known as the Fauj-i-Khas, were drilled in linear tactics and equipped with muskets and bayonets. These reforms produced a disciplined standing army that could be deployed for extended campaigns, in contrast to the traditional irregular levies that had characterised earlier Sikh warfare.

The traveler Baron von Hügel later observed that the plain of Chhachh, where the battle was fought, had been for eight centuries a territory where successive waves of invaders from the north-west Alexander the Great, Mahmud of Ghazni, Timur, Babur, Nader Shah and Ahmad Shah Abdali and had passed through to conquer India.The Historian Ganda Singh notes that it was Ranjit Singh who recovered the territory lost about eight centuries earlier and turned the tide of invasion in the opposite direction.

=== Strategic importance of Attock ===
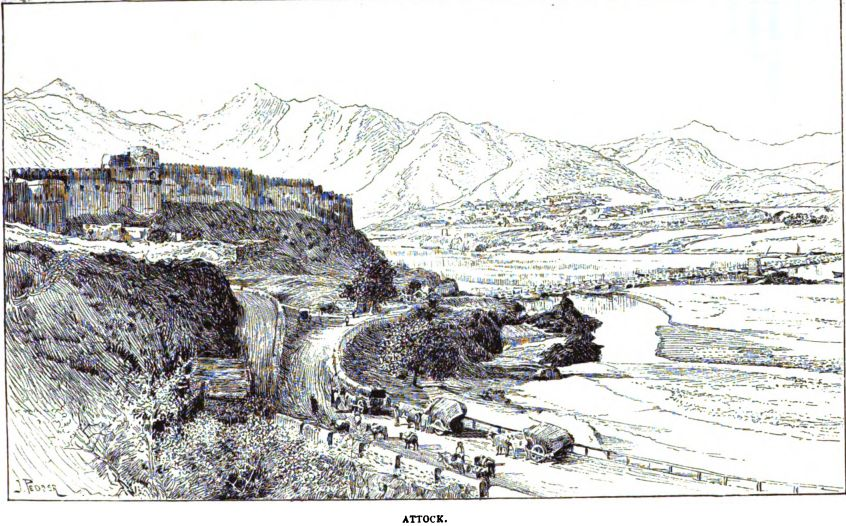
Attock Fort, whose capture by the Sikh Empire led to the Battle of Attock

The fort of Attock was built by the Mughal emperor Akbar in 1581 to dominate the passage over the Indus and to secure his kingdom from the restless frontier tribes. It was situated on a height on the eastern bank of the Indus and was built under the supervision of Khawaja Shams-ud-Din Khwafi. The fort was constructed in the form of a parallelogram, with its shorter sides about 400 yards (370 m) each and the other sides about double that length. The walls were of polished stone.

The fort commanded the principal crossing point between the Punjab and Afghanistan and controlled the approach to the Khyber Pass. It dominated the crossing place on the route followed by nearly all invaders of India from the north-west, and has been called the "key to the frontier" or the "Gateway of India." The armies of Alexander, Timur and Nader Shah had crossed the Indus at this point in different ages. Its location was of great importance from both the military and the commercial point of view. Chhabra writes that whoever wanted to make India safe against foreign attack had to control the fort of Attock.

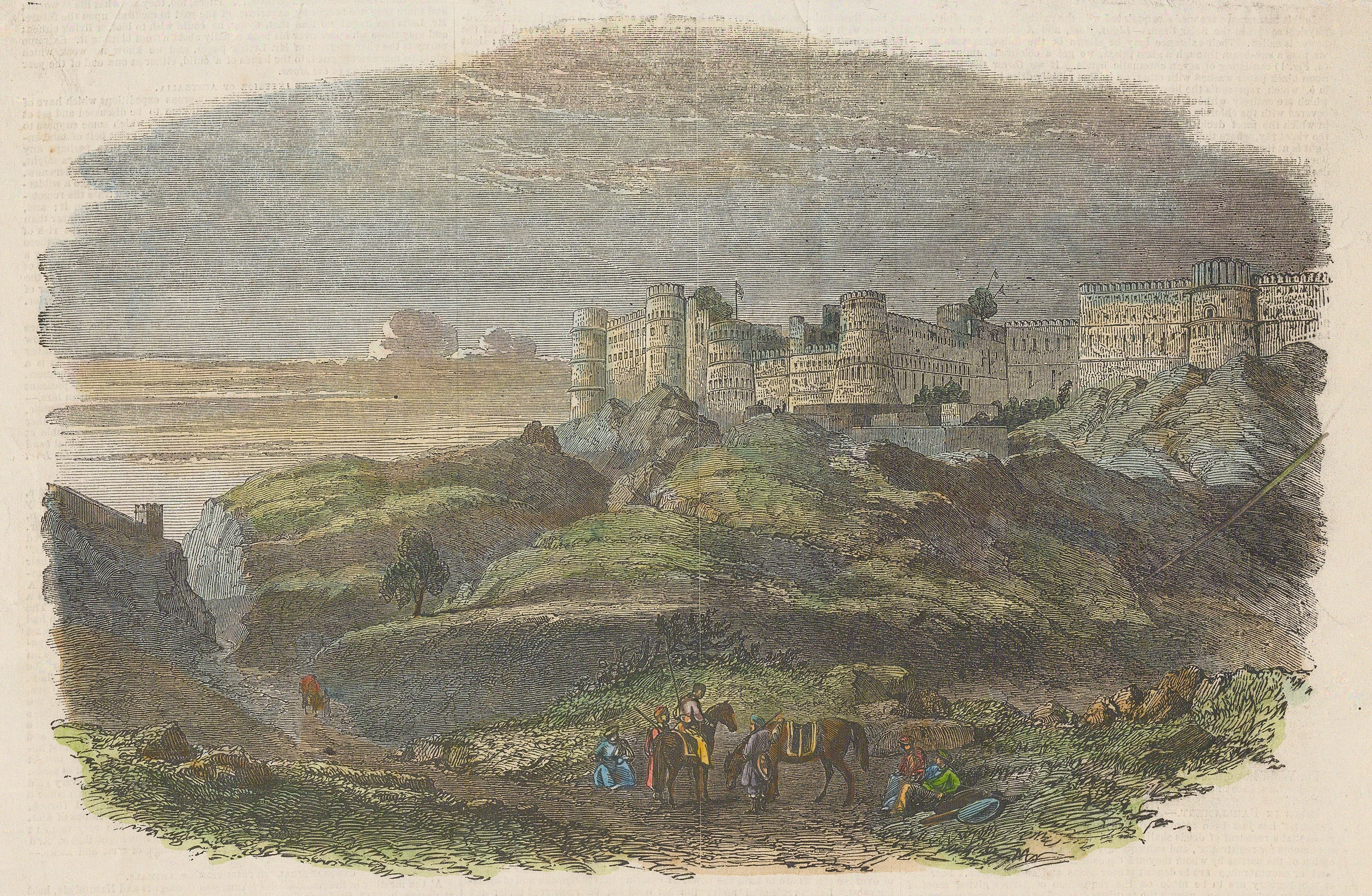
Attock Fort

Opposite the Attock fort, on the western bank of the Indus, lay the fort of Khairabad, also built by Akbar.

== Prelude ==
=== Kashmir campaign of 1812 ===
In 1812, Ranjit Singh and Fateh Khan Barakzai agreed on a joint expedition to conquer Kashmir from Ata Muhammad Khan, who had refused to submit to the Barakzai wazir. Ranjit Singh and Fateh Khan met at Rohtas or somewhere near Rawalpindi and came to an agreement. There are different versions of the precise terms, but it appears Ranjit Singh counted upon a share of Kashmir and either in territory or in revenues and possession of Multan.

Dewan Mokham Chand was sent with 12,000 Sikh troops to join the Afghan forces. Kashmir was occupied and Ata Muhammad Khan was expelled in the middle of February 1813. However, Fateh Khan did not fulfil his commitments to Ranjit Singh, and the Sikh allies left the country in disgust. The exact nature of the agreement and the extent of the failure to honour it are disputed in the sources, but the breach led directly to Ranjit Singh's decision to seize Attock.

=== Negotiations with Jahandad Khan ===
Ranjit Singh had not relied solely on Fateh Khan's good faith. While the joint expedition was being planned in December 1812, Jahandad Khan, the governor of Attock, became restless at the prospect of his brother's defeat. Ata Muhammad Khan advised Jahandad to negotiate a deal with Ranjit Singh for the surrender of Attock. While Ranjit Singh was still at Rohtas negotiating with Fateh Khan, Jahandad Khan sent confidential messengers to the Maharaja. He demanded security against Kabul, a jagir (land grant) in the Punjab, and a handsome allowance. Ranjit Singh received the agents warmly, approved the proposal, and asked Jahandad Khan to meet him at Wazirabad. The terms were amicably settled and the bargain was confirmed. Both parties appointed spies to report the result of the Wazirs's Kashmir campaign at the earliest opportunity. According to Chhabra, Ranjit Singh was intriguing with Jahandad Khan even before the expedition on Kashmir was led, which some writers have cited as the reason Fateh Khan refused to share the Kashmir booty.

=== Surrender of Attock ===
While leaving Rohtas, Ranjit Singh appointed Daya Singh as commander of a strong contingent stationed at Serai Kali,11 km from Hasan Abdal towards Rawalpindi, with orders to occupy the fort of Attock when offered. Another force under Bhayya Ram Singh Purabia was posted at Hasan Abdal, 53 km from Attock, to reinforce Daya Singh in an emergency. Devi Das, Mit Singh Bharania and Fakir Aziz-ud-din were sent from Lahore to stay at Hasan Abdal to complete the negotiations.

Kashmir fell to the wazir in the middle of February 1813, and the news reached Lahore and Attock simultaneously around 20 February. Jahandad Khan contacted Daya Singh to take possession of the fort. The diplomatic party headed by Fakir Aziz-ud-din asked Daya Singh to wait until the safe return of Dewan Mokham Chand, who was with the wazir at the head of a strong Sikh force making its way out of the Pir Panjal mountains. The Diwan was hurriedly returning in view of the Attock affair. The three parties reached Attock on 9 March. Abdur Rahim, the garrison master of the fort, relinquished it to the Maharaja's officers and helped them firmly establish their hold on it. Jahandad Khan went to Lahore. The fort of Attock with134 villages became a part of Ranjit Singh's kingdom at the cost of one lakh rupees.

The following articles fell into the hands of the Sikhs in the fort: 3,510 maunds (1,400 quintals) of grain, 430 maunds (170 quintals) of ammunition, 235 maunds (93 quintals) of tobacco and rock salt, and seventy pieces of guns, mortars and swivels.

Ranjit Singh refused to accept congratulations and nazar (ceremonial offerings) from his courtiers. He expected an attack on the fort by Fateh Khan while the wazir was returning from Kashmir to Kabul.

After the fort passed into Sikh possession, Qazi Ghulam Muhammad, who had been at Attock to decide religious cases, crossed the Indus and took refuge in Khatak country under Firoz Khan. The Sikhs plundered his house and set it on fire. Amir Singh Sandhanwalia later called him back, restored a portion of his old jagir, and granted him a new jagir worth Rs. 300 a year in the Khatak country. After some time, Ranjit Singh appointed him his wakil (agent) for the Khataks and Yusufzais. He held this office until 1842, when he was put to death by a Nihang.

== Military preparations ==
=== Afghan response ===
Fateh Khan entrusted the government of Kashmir to his brother Azim Khan. Upon hearing the news of the fall of Attock, he sent a detachment to intercept Dewan Mohkam Chand, who had already left the valley, but the Sikh force could not be overtaken. The wazir was deeply perturbed over the loss of Attock, as the rulers of Kabul attached the greatest importance to the possession of Peshawar, which controlled the Khyber Pass, and to Attock, which dominated the passage across the Indus to Kashmir.

He reorganised his army for the coming battle and allowed his soldiers one month's holiday in Kashmir to refresh themselves. He arrived at Muzaffarabad towards the close of May 1813. The advance party under his brother Dost Mohammad Khan arrived in Hazara not far from Hasan Abdal, gathering information about the Sikh positions and stopping supplies sent from Lahore from reaching the fort. The wazir joined him there.

In Kabul, Fateh Khan was busy recruiting soldiers and collecting ammunition for a strong attack on the Sikh garrison in Attock. He issued orders to his brother Jabbar Khan, the governor of Derajat, to purchase horses of the best breed and to maintain and train the best troops. He warned Ranjit Singh that he must evacuate the fort of Attock immediately or expect to face him there very soon.

=== Sikh reinforcement ===
Ranjit Singh prepared a large army and sent it toward Attock. The force was placed under the command of Dewan Mokham Chand, his most experienced general, and included Sardar Hari Singh Nalwa and Sardar Desa Singh Majithia. The soldiers had taken the measure of Durrani strength during the Kashmir campaign and did not think it difficult to wrest the fort from them. The British East India Company supplied two thousand muskets to the Maharaja for the campaign.

Ranjit Singh had also fully strengthened the fort of Attock with troops and arms, in addition to a large supply of food.

== Campaign ==
=== Battle of Hasan Abdal (7 June 1813) ===
Fateh Khan attacked the Sikh outpost at Hasan Abdal on 7 June 1813 with 2,000 Afghans. The Sikh detachment at Hasan Abdal, commanded by Bhayya Ram Singh Purabia, had only 500 horse and foot. About fifty men were killed on both sides. Ram Singh and his men took to flight, and his entire baggage, horses and camels fell into the wazir's hands.

Following this success, Fateh Khan and Dost Mohammad Khan closely besieged the fort of Attock and cut off all supplies to it. Daya Singh held the fort with Devi Das as his deputy. By 20 June 1813, the food supplies as well as ammunition in the fort were completely exhausted. Frantic appeals were made to Lahore to save the garrison and the fort.

=== Relief force under Dewan Mokham Chand ===
On 31 May 1813, Ranjit Singh had issued instructions to Munshi Devi Das to be watchful of the wazir's machinations. The same day, Dewan Mokham Chand encamped on the eastern bank of the Ravi River with 10,000 horse and foot and several cannon. He arrived at Rawalpindi on 7 June, the same day the wazir had won his victory at Hasan Abdal, 46 km away.

On learning of Mokham Chand's arrival at Rawalpindi, the wazir declared a jihad (holy war) against the Sikhs. Thousands of Yusufzai and Khatak Pathans flocked to fight. From Kabul, a strong contingent under princes Ayub and Abbas arrived on the western banks of the Indus, but could not cross for want of sufficient boats, as all the boats in the vicinity of Attock were held by the Sikh troops.

The Maharaja ordered Dewan Mokham Chand to send supplies to the fort at any cost. This message reached the Diwan on the night of 24 June at Burhan, 12 km from Hasan Abdal on the road to Attock, which was 40 km distant. At daybreak on 8 July, the Diwan marched cautiously to a point halfway, where Fateh Khan had stationed a picket on the banks of a rivulet. The picket withdrew, and the Diwan spent the night there. Seven quintals of grain fell into the Diwan's hands. The troops took their meals, bathed in the rivulet, slept briefly, crossed the stream, and marched along its southern bank, watering their animals on an extremely hot day.

=== Deployment ===
At 4 o'clock in the afternoon, the Diwan reached the Indus, 8 km from the fort. The Afghan army was deployed to oppose him. Dost Mohammad Khan commanded the vanguard, which consisted of mujahidin from the frontier tribes supported by Afghan cavalry. The wazir himself commanded the centre, with the infantry and artillery under his direct control.

Diwan Mokham Chand organised his cavalry into four divisions in the form of a square, each side containing 2,000 men. An infantry battalion of 2,000 men was stationed in the centre of the square. The Diwan took his position at the head of the infantry on an elephant, on whose back on both sides two light cannon were tied, with gunners ready to fire.

The Historian Fauja Singh provides a more detailed description of the Sikh battle order. The whole army was divided into four parts: right, centre, left and reserve. Infantry and artillery were posted in the centre and a little ahead of the rest of the army. Some artillery was also placed in the reserve. The cavalry was distributed over all parts, but its main positions were on the right and left wings. The formation was designed as a strategic bow, with the infantry and artillery forming the centre of the bow and the cavalry wings forming the ends, while the reserve composed of both cavalry and artillery was positioned behind the centre to act as an arrow.

Mian Ghaus Khan, the darogha (superintendent) of the Sikh artillery corps, lingered in the rear away from the battlefield. It later transpired that he had been won over by Fateh Khan in the name of Islam and had promised to remain inactive during the battle.

== Battle ==
Sources differ on the date of the main engagement. Hari Ram Gupta states that the battle took place on 9 July 1813 (Friday, 11 Asarh, 1870 Bikrami), from 4 a.m. to 1 p.m., near the village of Haidru (or Haidaru), close to Attock. Ganda Singh and Dhillon date the battle to 13 July 1813. The plain where the fighting occurred is known as the Chhachh, and the engagement is referred to in various sources as the Battle of Haidru, the Battle of Chuch, or the Battle of Chhachh.

Battle of Attock or Chuch

=== Initial phase ===
The Afghan forces opened the attack. The vanguard composed of the Mulkia Musalmans and frontier ghazis delivered a assault on the front division of the Sikhs, who met them with a heavy fire of musketry and artillery. Dost Mohammad Khan then led a cavalry charge against the Sikh line, his horsemen rushing forward yelling and shouting. The initial shock of the Afghan attack caused confusion in the Sikh vanguard, and the Sikh infantry began to give way. Some of the Sikh guns were captured by the advancing Afghans.

The Sikh squares were broken, and the situation became critical. At this point, Mian Ghaus Khan arrived on the scene with the artillery corps. The Diwan ordered him to direct his artillery to fire, but Ghaus Khan ignored the command. When the Diwan ordered Ghaus Khan's assistants, Aziz Khan and Shaikh Budha, to discharge their artillery, Ghaus Khan prohibited them from firing. The Sikh artillery remained silent at the most dangerous moment of the battle.

=== Diwan Mokham Chand's counterattack ===
Diwan Mokham Chand realised the seriousness of the situation as the Sikh army came under increasing pressure. Calling on his troops to maintain their positions and advance with him, he ordered the two light cannons attached to his elephant to fire intermittently while moving forward. Smoke and dust spread across the battlefield, while a strong easterly wind reduced visibility and carried dust toward the Afghan forces. The fighting took place during the midday heat of July, which contemporary accounts describe as placing additional strain on the Afghan troops. Mokham Chand then dismounted from his elephant, mounted a horse, and personally led the reserve force of artillery, cavalry, and infantry in a counterattack against the advancing Afghan army.

The Sikh cavalry resorted to utara (dismounting) and fought with swords in hand-to-hand combat. The Sikh guns, when they finally opened fire, proved most useful, checking the Afghan advance and killing large numbers of the enemy. The Sikh cavalry also dismounted and fought with the sword. A hand-to-hand struggle ensued in which both sides fought hardly.

=== Afghan rout ===
Under pressure from the Sikh counterattack, Dost Mohammad Khan withdrew from the battlefield. During the ensuing confusion, Fateh Khan reportedly believed his brother had been killed. The Afghan cavalry and many ghazis retreated toward the Indus River. Assessing that further resistance would be too costly, Fateh Khan ordered a withdrawal rather than committing his rearguard to continued fighting. Boats had been prepared in advance, allowing many of the surviving Afghan forces to cross the river to Khairabad, although contemporary accounts state that numerous men and horses drowned while attempting the crossing. The Sikh cavalry pursued the retreating Afghan forces for approximately eight kos (about 27 km) before ending the pursuit, securing the Sikh victory.

The Diwan's success was complete. A contemporary newsletter written by a banker's agent described the battle: "The Durranis made a sudden attack and the artillery and swivels were fired from this side and that after a great deal of fighting and killing the enemy felt that they could not withstand the shock and took to flight, that most of the enemy was drowned in the river Attock."

== Aftermath ==
=== Casualties and spoils ===
Estimates of Afghan casualties vary. Some sources place Afghan losses at 2,000 men killed and wounded. Another contemporary account, cited by Ganda Singh, places the number of Afghans killed at about 3,000. Dost Mohammad Khan was seriously wounded in the battle. Fateh Khan Barakzai himself was wounded and fled from the field.

The Afghans left behind numerous tents, many horses and camels, a considerable quantity of weapons including seven light guns, and a large stock of wheat. All of these fell into Sikh hands.

=== Ghaus Khan's betrayal ===
A letter received at Lahore on 16 July 1813 reported that Ghaus Khan, the darogha of the artillery, had neither engaged his guns nor allowed his men to obey the Diwan during the battle. On 21 July, the Maharaja observed that Ghaus Khan had left nothing undone to bring about defeat and issued orders summoning him to court. Ghaus Khan did not dare to appear before the Maharaja and remained at home, feigning illness. No action appears to have been taken against Ghaus Khan, who was an old servant of the Sikh state since the days of Ranjit Singh's father, Maha Singh. A newsletter dated 5 April 1814 indicates that Ghaus Khan's subordinates, Aziz Khan and Shaikh Budha, were instructed to remain obedient to him.

=== Celebrations and rewards ===
Ranjit Singh received the news of the victory on 12 July 1813 through a letter from Pind Dadan Khan. He celebrated the victory by illuminating the cities of Lahore and Amritsar and by showering silver rupees on the people in public places. He declared that "Diwan Mohkam Chand was preordained to be successful, for wherever he went he obtained a victory."

The Maharaja granted rewards to those who had distinguished themselves in the campaign. Diwan Radha Kishan, who had scaled the walls of the fort of Attock to supply food to the starving garrison, saw his son Devi Sahae appointed commander of the Ghorcharha Khas, an elite cavalry unit. Nihal Singh Atariwala, who had exhibited great valour in the battle, received a cash reward of Rs.20,000 and two villages in jagir on the banks of the Jhelum River on 21 August 1813.

=== Strategic consequences ===
The Battle of Attock was the first pitched battle between the Sikhs and the Afghans. Ganda Singh describes it as "the first real Panjabi victory over the Afghans," after which the Afghans "from this time began to entertain a dread of their (Sikhs) prowess." The superiority of Sikh arms was established, which led to considerable consequences favourable to the Sikhs.

The formidable fort of Attock, which had been taken from Raja Jaipal in 1001 by Mahmud of Ghazni, was captured by the Sikhs. Sikh sway was extended to the Indus River, and the whole territory of the fertile Chhachh plain came under the Sikh Empire. Afghan power on the eastern side of the Indus crumbled, enabling Ranjit Singh to consolidate his power in the area. The victory also checked the continuous invasions from the north-west and, in the assessment of some historians, ended Afghan political power in India.

Historian A.C Banerjee, citing von Hügel, writes: "The Muhammadan power was already on the decline in India and the unimportant battle of Chuch only drove the last bands over the Indus." The immediate result was the elimination of Afghan influence on the east side of the Indus. Attock was occupied and strongly garrisoned as a Sikh outpost.

Chhabra notes that the victory was the first Sikh-Afghan war and gave Ranjit Singh encouragement for future expansion. It secured control of the strategically placed Attock fort and opened the gates for Sikh exploits in the North-West. The moral effect of the victory over the Afghans was considered worth even more than the fort itself.

The victory also enhanced the prestige of the Maharaja's empire. Harbans Singh writes that this was one of Ranjit Singh's greatest military successes, and his name began to be adored by his countrymen while his enemies dreaded it.

=== Counterfactual assessments ===
Several historians have discussed the possible consequences had the battle resulted in an Afghan victory. Banerjee quotes one opinion that an Afghan victory "would have been as important an episode in the history of the Sikhs as the Third Battle of Panipat was in the history of the Marathas in the north," but he is cautious about this assessment. He points out that Fateh Khan was not Ahmad Shah Abdali and that there was no consolidated Afghanistan behind the Barakzai wazir. The Afghan chiefs in India were divided by personal and clan jealousies, the Persians were always ready to strike at the wazir's back, and he had to lead an expedition to Khorasan after his defeat at Chuch. In such a situation, Banerjee argues, the wazir had little prospect of recovering the whole heritage of Ahmad Shah.

Ganda Singh makes a similar assessment, arguing that Fateh Khan was not Ahmad Shah Abdali and Ranjit Singh was not Sadashivrao Bhau. There was no consolidated Afghanistan behind the Barakzai wazir, whose usurpation of authority was resented by Shah Mahmud as well as by other tribal chiefs.

Ganda Singh also states that if the Afghans had won the battle, an Afghan victory would have meant the fall of Attock, the Muslim chiefs of Jhang and the Sind Sagar Doab would have acknowledged the supremacy of Kabul, and the victorious wazir, with the resources of Kashmir at his disposal and with Peshawar and Attock in his hands, might have marched eastward. A Sikh defeat, he writes, "would have meant what the Marathas' defeat in the Third Battle of Panipat had meant to the latter. Consequently, the Punjab would not have seen the peace and prosperity that it enjoyed during Ranjit Singh's reign."

=== Fateh Khan's subsequent attempts to recover Attock ===
The loss of Attock remained a grievance for Fateh Khan for the remainder of his life (1813–1818). On 25 December 1813, he sent his Diwan Nand Ram with a letter to Attock proposing friendship, writing: "Still nothing is lost. Give the fort of Attock to me so that the relations of friendship between the two parties may become strong." Dewan Mokham Chand replied: "The fort of Attock would never be handed over to you, and that the country of Kashmir would soon be conquered by us."

In the winter of 1814, Fateh Khan came to Multan and received a nazar of three lakh rupees from Muzaffar Khan, the Multan governor. He encamped on the banks of the Chenab River and again sent a message requesting the return of Attock. Ranjit Singh dispatched Dal Singh Naherna and Ram Dayal to observe the wazir's movements, and the wazir withdrew to the west of the Indus.

In 1814, Yar Muhammad Khan, the governor of Peshawar, attacked the fort of Attock with the help of the Khattaks of the Khairabad district. Hukma Singh Chimni and Sham Singh Atariwala, who were in the neighbourhood, repelled the attack and drove Yar Muhammad Khan back to the western side of the Indus.

On 15 December 1815, Fateh Khan sent another letter through Gujar Mai Vakil, offering to secure the fort of Multan for Ranjit Singh in exchange for Attock and offering to pay revenue tax from Kashmir as assessed by the wazir himself. Ranjit Singh did not accept. In May 1816, Fateh Khan travelled to Kashmir by the road of Pakhli and Dhamtaur in the Hazara hills. Ranjit Singh appointed Ram Dayal and Dal Singh at Attock to watch his movements. Attock remained a permanent part of the Sikh Empire.

== Historiography ==
Historians of the Sikh Empire have generally treated the Battle of Attock as a significant engagement in Ranjit Singh's reign. Hari Ram Gupta describes it as the moment that marked the shift of Sikh military ambition beyond the Indus and demonstrated the strength of Ranjit Singh's reformed army. Fauja Singh, writing on the military system of the Sikhs, treats the battle as one of the best illustrations of Sikh tactics of the period, emphasising the role of the cavalry and the artillery in securing the victory and highlighting the Diwan's personal leadership at the critical moment. Anil Chandra Banerjee presents the battle as the event that eliminated Afghan influence on the eastern side of the Indus (excluding Kashmir).

Chhabra cites the assessment of Dr. N. L. Sinha that the victory was important because, had Fateh Khan been victorious, "with rich Kashmir valley in hand, and consolidated power in Afghanistan, Peshawar and Attock; and flushed with victory over the Sikhs, he would certainly have attempted to win back the whole heritage of Ahmad Shah." Baron von Hügel, who visited the Attock fort in December 1835, offered a contrasting assessment, describing the battle as "unimportant" and remarking that it "only drove the last bands over the Indus." Modern historians have generally considered von Hügel's verdict too dismissive, with Ganda Singh pointing to the strategic and political consequences that followed from the Sikh victory.

== See also ==
- Afghan–Sikh wars
- Siege of Multan (1818)
- Battle of Nowshera

== Bibliography ==
- Banerjee, Anil Chandra (1985). The Khalsa Raj. Abhinav Publications. ISBN 0836413555.
- Chhabra, G. S. (1960). The Advanced Study in History of the Punjab. Vol. 2. New Academic Publishing Company.
- Dhillon, Balwant Singh, ed. (2014). "Perspectives on Guru Granth Sahib". Perspectives on Guru Granth Sahib. 9. Centre on Studies in Sri Guru Granth Sahib, Guru Nanak Dev University. ISSN 2393-9745.
- Gupta, Hari Ram (1978). History of the Sikhs: The Sikh Lion of Lahore, Maharaja Ranjit Singh,1799–1839. Vol. 5 (3rd, illustrated ed.). Munshiram Manoharlal. ISBN 978-8121505154.
- Singh, Ganda (1987). "The Punjab Past and Present". The Punjab Past and Present. 21 (1). Department of Punjab Historical Studies, Punjabi University.
- Johar, Surinder Singh (1985). The Secular Maharaja: A Biography of Maharaja Ranjit Singh. Manas.
- Singh, Fauja (1964). Military System of the Sikhs: During the Period 1799–1849. Motilal Banarsidass.
- Singh, Harbans (1952). Maharaja Ranjit Singh. Sikh Publishing House.
- Singh, Khushwant (2003). Ranjit Singh: Maharaja of the Punjab, 1780-1839. Penguin. p. 115. ISBN 978-0-14-100684-0.
- Heath, Ian; Perry, Michael (2005). The Sikh Army 1799–1849. Men-at-Arms (Book 421). Osprey Publishing. ISBN 978-1-84176-777-2.
