= Ghilji rebellion (1801) =

Rebellion by the Ghiljis (1801–1802)

- Part of Afghan Civil War (1793–1823)
Date	1801–1802
Location	Kandahar, Ghazni, and Kabul, Durrani Empire (Afghanistan)
Result	Government victory

Belligerents
Durrani Empire	Tokhi; Hotak

Commanders and leaders
Mahmud Shah Durrani; Fateh Khan Barakzai; Sher Muhammad Khan Bamizai Mukhtar al-Daula	Abd al-Rahim Khan Hotak (executed)

Strength
Several thousand	Unknown

Casualties and losses
Unknown	3,000–6,000 killed

The Ghilji rebellion was a major tribal uprising in eastern Afghanistan in the Durrani Empire under the reign of Mahmud Shah Durrani. It was led by the Hotak and Tokhi tribes of the Ghilji confederation of the Pashtuns, who sought to challenge Durrani rule and reclaim influence lost since the fall of the Hotak dynasty in Persia. The rebellion was suppressed by the combined forces of Wazir Fateh Khan and Sher Mohammad Khan Bamizai in a series of engagements between 1801 and 1802.

== Background ==
The Ghilji tribe, once rulers of Persia under the Hotak dynasty, had long resented their subjugation by the Durrani monarchy. Their chiefs, especially from the Hotak and Tokhi clans, retained memories of past sovereignty and continued to challenge Durrani authority in Kandahar and the surrounding regions. By 1801, internal instability within the Durrani Empire and the rivalry between factions loyal to Shah Mahmud and Shah Shuja provided an opening for the Ghilzais to attempt a power bid. The rebels rapidly gained strength in Kandahar and marched toward Ghazni, defeating its governor in open battle.

== The Rebellion ==
After seizing control of large areas around Kandahar, the Ghilzais advanced on Ghazni but failed to take its fortress. Leaving a detachment to contain the garrison, they boldly marched on Kabul, aiming to overthrow Mahmud and restore Ghilzai prominence.

At this time, Shah Mahmud's principal commander, Shir Muhammad Khan Bamizai, had been imprisoned under suspicion of high treason. Desperate for leadership, Mahmud released him and placed him in command of the Kizilbash division. Shir Muhammad engaged the rebels near Kabul, defeating them with heavy artillery fire. Though initially repelled, the Ghilzais regrouped and nearly captured the capital, but their delay in plundering nearby villages allowed Shir Muhammad to reorganize his forces and block their advance.

The decisive encounter occurred near Qal‘a-yi Shahi, close to Kabul, in November 1801. Fatih Khan Muhammadzai and Shir Muhammad Khan led a coordinated assault that inflicted catastrophic losses on the insurgents contemporary estimates ranging from 3,000 to 6,000 dead. Further engagements through early 1802 crushed remaining resistance; by May 1802, after four major battles, the rebellion was effectively over.

== Aftermath ==
The suppression of the revolt was followed by severe reprisals. The Hotak and Tokhi clans suffered heavily, both in casualties and in punitive measures imposed by Durrani authorities. To deter further unrest, Shah Mahmud ordered the execution of the rebel leader Abd al-Rahim Khan Hotak and two of his sons, who were blown from the mouths of cannons a punishment meant to serve as a warning to other Ghilzai tribes.

The rebellion's defeat consolidated Durrani control over central and eastern Afghanistan but deepened the historical animosity between the Ghilzai and Durrani confederations. The campaign also reinforced Fatih Khan Muhammadzai's influence at court, setting the stage for his later prominence during the Barakzai ascendancy.
