= Fateh Khan Barakzai =

Afghan Wazir of the Durrani Empire

Fateh Khan Barakzai فتح الله خان بارکزی
- Wazir

Wazirs of the Durrani Empire
- Predecessor: Wafadar Khan
- Successor: Mukhtar ad-Daula (1803); Akram Khan (1809); Civil war (1818)

Head of House of Barakzai
- Born: 1777; Kandahar, Durrani Empire
- Died: August 1818 (aged 40–41); Herat or Ghazni, Durrani Empire
- House: Musahiban
- Dynasty: Barakzai dynasty
- Father: Payandah Khan Barakzai
- Religion: Sunni Islam
- Military career
- Conflicts: Battle of Qal‘a-yi Shahi; 1803 anti-Shia riots in Kabul; Battle of Nimla (1809); Battle of Hasan Abdal (1813); Afghan–Sikh capture of Kashmir (1812–1813); Battle of Attock (1813); Battle of Kashmir (1814); Battle of Kafir Qala (WIA)

Fateh Khan Barakzai or Wazir Fateh Khan or simply, Fateh Khan, was Wazir of the Durrani Empire during the reign of Mahmud Shah Durrani until his torture and execution at the hands of Kamran Shah Durrani, the son of the ruler of the Durrani Empire, and Mahmud Shah Durrani, along with other prominent conspirators such as Ata Mohammad Khan. Fateh Khan was of the Barakzai tribe, and his death led to his tribe revolting and the eventual deposition of Mahmud Shah Durrani.

== Rise to Power (1800–1801) ==
Zaman Shah Durrani ushered through an era of prosperity that the Durrani Empire had not seen for a while. However all was not good, with the Barakzais chiefs who planned to topple Zaman Shah; they had laid the constituent articles that Zaman Shah should be overthrown and replaced by his brother, Sujah Mirza, the Durrani crown should be elective, with the chiefs confirming the next rulers, and also that the kings who have been proven unworthy can be deposed by the chiefs.

Wafadar Khan, the then Wazir of the Durrani Empire under the rule of Zaman Shah Durrani began suspecting a plot was formulating on Zaman Shah, and discovered a plot where Payindah Khan Barakzai, Azim Khan Alakozai, the head of the Jawanshir Qizilbash, and numerous other prominent chiefs. Wafadar Khan then informed Zaman Shah of what had come, where he fabricated witnesses to the event, while Payindah Khan's sons claimed Wafadar Khan was attempting to bring the fall of the Barakzai.

Nonetheless, Payindah Khan and other conspirators were rounded up and executed, with their heads being displayed publicly in Kandahar. This execution brought dire consequences, such as the alliance between the Durranis and the Barakzais which was now broken. As a result, Fateh Khan, who was the eldest of Payindah Khan's children, fled to Persia where Mahmud Shah Durrani was in exile, and swore his allegiance to him. As Zaman Shah became tied down in the Punjab for his campaigns, Mahmud Shah and Fateh Khan rallied and left for Grishk, raising a force to march on Kandahar. The situation worsened when Zaman Shah executed the Durrani governor of Kashmir after promising safe conduct. Upon hearing this, his brother, Saidal Khan, opened the gates of Kandahar to Mahmud Shah's force. With the fall of Kandahar, Mahmud Shah marched on Ghazni, and the two armies of Zaman Shah and Fateh Khan met at Muqur. Before the battle even began, several prominent Sardars defected from Zaman Shah to the cause of Shah Mahmud, leading to Zaman Shah's army being dissolved in panic. With this, Mahmud Shah and Fateh Khan marched on Kabul, seizing it and establishing Shah Mahmud as the new ruler. Wafadar Khan would be executed by Fateh Khan himself.

Zaman Shah escaped out of Kabul and took refuge at Rawalpindi where he was met by Ranjit Singh who gave him a house to stay in but later due to his safety concerns, Ranjit Singh welcomed him to stay in Lahore, with a monthly allowance of 1,500 rupees. Later, from Lahore, Zaman Shah moved to Ludhiana where he lived for the rest of his life.

=== First deposition of Mahmud Shah Durrani (1803) ===
Shah Shuja Durrani began his attempt for the throne of the Durrani Empire, and successfully defeated Mahmud Shah on 12 July 1803. Following this, Shah Shuja entered Kabul and established his rule there. Zaman Shah then sent Qaizar Mirza to Kandahar, where Fateh Khan and Kamran Shah Durrani resided. During this, Fateh Khan held negotiations with Qaizar Mirza and established terms for him to cede Kandahar. As a result, he opened the gates of Kandahar while Kamran Shah left for Herat. However when Fateh Khan arrived in Kabul to pledge allegiance in person to Shah Shuja, the deal they established was not upheld, leaving Fateh Khan discontent.

=== Attempts to return to power (1803–1809) ===
As a result, in the Autumn of 1803, when Shah Shuja left for Peshawar to spend the winter there, Fateh Khan had freed numerous princes from the Bala Hissar and encouraged Qaizar Mirza to join this growing rebellion. When Shah Shuja sent a force against Qaizar, he surrendered and begged for mercy, to which he was pardoned and his position as the governor of Kandahar was affirmed. Fateh Khan then attempted to flee to Herat, but returned after its governor pledged allegiance to Shah Shuja, leading to Fateh Khan being imprisoned in Kandahar by Qaizar. Despite this, he convinced Qaizar to free him, leading to Fateh Khan fleeing to Grishk, where he raised a force with Kamran Shah, and they collectively marched on Kandahar. However, as the battle neared, Fateh Khan defected and the forces of Qaizar and Fateh Khan defeated Kamran Shah, Despite this, the alliance did not last long, and Fateh Khan again defected back to Kamran Shah, collectively uniting their forces under Firoz-al-Din, Kamran Shah, and Fateh Khan. However Firoz-al-Din fled before completing the campaign due to a Qajar invasion.

As the Persians invaded Herat, Mukhtar al-Daula, the Wazir of Shah Shuja, alongside Khwaja Khanji had placed Qaizar on the throne, with his firm support in Kandahar. Fateh Khan as well joined this revolt and pledged allegiance to Shah Qaizar. Despite this, on 3 March 1808, the rebellion was shattered at a battle outside of Peshawar. Numerous leaders were captured, and some impaled such as Mukhtar al-Daula. Following this, Qaizar Shah fled to Kohistan while Mahmud Shah reached Kandahar, joining forces with Fateh Khan. Shah Shuja defeated the coalition of Mahmud and Fateh Khan at Qalati Ghilji but did not follow up with this victory, and returned to Peshawar. Shah Shuja attempted to re-conquer Kashmir, which was in a rebellious state, but his army was slaughtered attempting to do so. As a result, Mahmud Shah and Fateh Khan re-cooperated and Shah Shuja left Peshawar for Jalalabad in June 1809. The two armies met at the battle of Nimla, where Shah Shuja was decisively defeated.

== Return to power and second reign of Mahmud Shah (1809–1818) ==
With this victory, Fateh Khan was reinstated in his position as Wazir of the Durrani Empire. Fateh Khan began consolidating power under him and his tribe and close family by deposing governors and then handing out Jagirs to his half brothers such as the Dil brothers. Fateh Khan attempted campaigning against the Sikhs but was defeated at the battle of Attock. Fateh Khan and Mahmud Shah also campaigned against Kashmir. However during this period of campaigning, rebels placed Abbas Mirza, a son of Timur Shah Durrani on the throne. Many of the Qizilbash leaders in Shah Mahmud's army fled for their lives following the news of this coup, and Fateh Khan and Shah Mahmud had no choice but to abandon the campaign thus far and return to Kabul, where the rebellion was quelled.

Khwaja Khanji fled to his positions of power in Kohistan. Months later, Dost Mohammad Khan entered the region with an army of Qizilbash, and began laying waste to the surrounding countryside from his base at Charikar. Dost Mohammad razed many regions including Tagab, the Koh Daman, and Kohistan. Despite this, Khwaja Khanji refused to surrender. Dost Mohammad resorted to intrigue, and promised a royal pardon. After luring him and his family, Khwaja Khanji was beheaded alongside numerous other leaders of Kohistan.

== Campaign to Herat (1818) ==
During this period of time, the Emirate of Herat had declared independence from the rule of Mahmud Shah. As a result, Fateh Khan sought to bring the region back under Durrani suzerainty, and launched a campaign as ordered by Mahmud Shah. Fateh Khan, alongside his brother, Dost Mohammad Khan, arrived at Herat by the end of April.

Fateh Khan then led a ploy where he tricked the ruler of Herat, Firoz al-Din, and entered the city. Fateh Khan arrested Firoz, and began consolidating power, while also sacking the city. During this period of chaos, the harem of the ruler was also infiltrated, leading to seizure of jewels and raping of women. Amongst the victims was Mahmud Shah's daughter, or niece. As a result, Kamran Shah Durrani swore revenge, but Dost Mohammad fled before any retaliation could be taken.

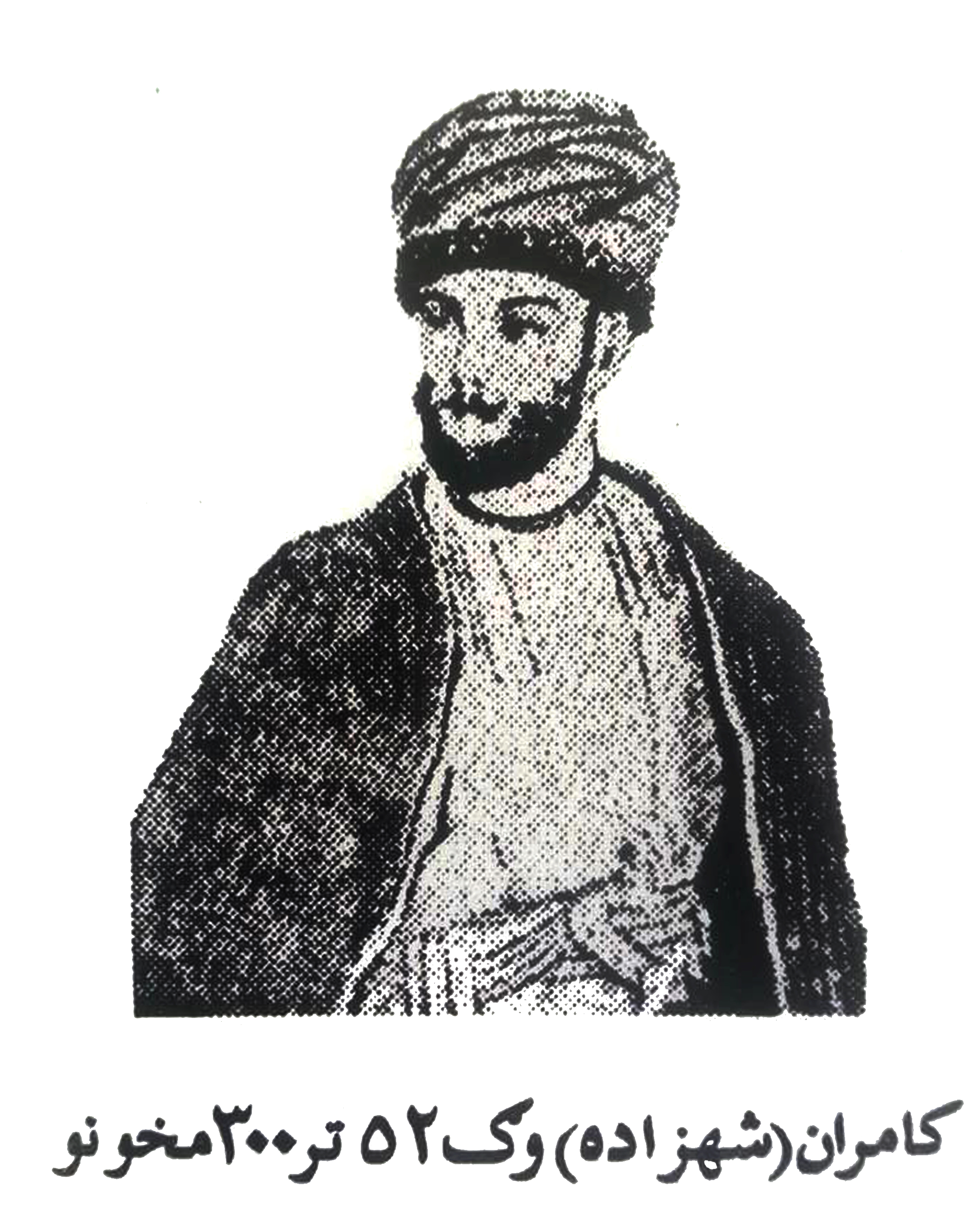
Sketch of Kamran Shah Durrani

With rule in Herat, Fateh Khan displaced the Persian ambassadors and forcing them to return to Persia. This sparked paranoia by Mahmud Shah, who believed that this would be used as a casus belli to invade. Mahmud Shah also used this as a pretext to weaken Barakzai power, who were gaining rapid influence and high positions throughout the empire. As a result, Kamran Shah was dispatched to Herat. During this, the Qajar governor of Khorasan dispatched forces under Dowlatshah to re-capture Herat. The two armies met at the battle of Kafir Qala, which ended inconclusively, with the Qajar army returning to Mashhad, and the Afghan army to Herat.

After the Afghan army returned to Herat, the letter under Kamran arrived. The letter demanded that Fateh Khan give up the city, and dismissed him from his position as Wazir. According to Jonathan Lee, Fateh Khan remarked:

"I twice placed Mahmud on the throne ... and his Kingdom is now in the hands of my kinsmen; who is Kamraun therefore, that in a dream he should think of injuring me."

== Execution ==
With this response, Kamran Shah began plotting and held a meal for Fateh Khan, claiming he wished to celebrate their victory in the capture of Herat. Different accounts are given.

According to Jonathan Lee, Fateh Khan was warned by his advisers against attending. Fateh Khan attended and found all of his sworn enemies. Nonetheless, Fateh Khan participated in the celebration and began eating with the guests. However as it progressed, the different enemies began berating him with insults and informing him of the crimes his family had committed. As Fateh Khan had enough, he rose in anger and wished to leave. However, the guests all grabbed and pinned him. With this, Ata Muhammad Khan then blinded Fateh Khan with his dagger. Fateh Khan was then imprisoned, and in the following days, his eyes were removed.

According to the account of Dalrymple, Fateh Khan was invited to a party in the royal garden outside the fortress of Herat. Fateh Khan and some of his brothers attended, and they became intoxicated after drinking much wine. Kamran then capitalized off of this, and having planned for this to happen, the other guests of the event tied up Fateh Khan and blinded him. Following his blinding, Fateh Khan was then tortured, with a scalping occurring.

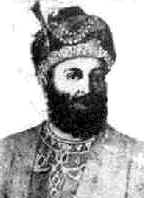
Sketch of Mahmud Shah Durrani

Jonathan Lee and Dalrymple differ on the accounts of execution as well.

According to Jonathan Lee, after Fateh Khan was held imprisoned for many months, he was taken to Ghazni to be held under trial by Mahmud Shah, and numerous of his enemies. Mahmud Shah promised to spare Fateh Khan's life on the demand that his brothers came in person and swore their loyalty to Mahmud Shah. Despite this, Fateh Khan rejected, believing that his brothers would ultimately be punished and tortured as he had been. As a result, Shah Mahmud struck Fateh Khan with his sword, and then other enemies began cutting off the limbs of Fateh Khan. After a while, Mahmud Shah decapitated Fateh Khan, with the maimed remains of Fateh Khan being rolled up in a carpet and buried.

According to Dalrymple, Fateh Khan was later led into a tent where multiple of his enemies were. Fateh Khan was demanded to write to Dost Mohammad Khan, and was demanded for him to lay down conflict against the Durranis. Fateh Khan refused this. His enemies, unsatisfied of this response, began mutilating him, hacking off pieces of his body. Fateh Khan's ears, nose, hands were cut off, and did not hold any complaints until his beard was cut, which he then began crying. After more torture including both his feet being cut off, Ata Muhammad Khan slit the throat of Fateh Khan, killing him.

This event happened in August 1818. The consequences that followed were disastrous for Mahmud Shah. The many Barakzai governors, who held high positions throughout the country and different provinces now revolted having heard of this, and they now plotted to overthrow the Durrani dynasty in its entirety. This would lead to the overthrow of Mahmud Shah Durrani in 1818, and the fragmentation of the Durrani Empire and the state of Afghanistan until its eventual reunification under Dost Mohammad Khan under the Emirate of Afghanistan in his last campaign in 1863.

== See also ==
- List of leaders of Afghanistan
- Shah Shuja Durrani
- Timur Shah Durrani
- Barakzai
