= Siege of Herat (1833) =

1833 siege of Herat, in what is now modern-day Afghanistan

Date	Summer 1833 – November 1833
Location	Herat, modern-day Afghanistan 34°20′31″N 62°12′11″E
Result	Iranian withdrawal: Herat remains a vassal of Qajar Iran

Belligerents
Emirate of Herat	Qajar Iran

Commanders and leaders
Kamran Mirza Durrani	Mohammad Mirza; Khosrow Mirza; Abol-Qasem Qa'em-Maqam
- Location of the siege on a map of modern Afghanistan Herat (South Asia)

The siege of Herat took place in late 1833 at Herat between Qajar Iran and the city's local Durrani ruler, Kamran Mirza Durrani.

== Background and siege ==
Herat, a frontier vassalage barely under Iranian control, was seen by the Qajar dynasty as an integral part of the Guarded Domains of Iran. Due to widespread anti-Iranian tensions in Herat and Britain's increasing engagement in Afghanistan, Iran's rule over Herat was under heavy threat. The British East India Company had started to advocate for Herat's autonomy as a buffer state between northwestern India, Russia and Iran, even though they had previously supported Iranian rule over the city.

In late 1831, the Iranian crown prince Abbas Mirza received the governorship of Khorasan, which amongst other things led to growing hostilities with Kamran Mirza Durrani, the Durrani ruler of Herat. The latter received an ultimatum from Abbas Mirza at the beginning of 1833 with two options: either have the name of the Iranian shah (king) mentioned on coin engravings and Friday prayers, pay taxes, and release hostages, or relinquish Herat and appear at the Iranian court.

Kamran Mirza responded by offering a "gift" of 15,000 toman in gold coins, cautioning Abbas Mirza that seeking more would require facing war. In the summer of 1833, Abbas Mirza sent an army to besiege Herat. Abbas Mirza wanted to capture Herat to show his military capabilities, but also to advance the eastern objectives of the Russian Empire, who was pressuring him. Iran's control of Herat was seen by the Russians as a threat to British India and a challenge to British objectives in Afghanistan. The Iranian army against Herat was led by Abbas Mirza's sons Mohammad Mirza and Khosrow Mirza, as well as his minister Abol-Qasem Qa'em-Maqam.

As a result, Kamran Mirza made an alliance with the British, whose operatives convinced him to oppose a military takeover by Iran. Capturing a portion of Iranian territory in Sistan was something he also considered. Mohammad Mirza was forced to end the siege and return to the capital Tehran after learning of Abbas Mirza's death in Mashhad in November 1833. There, he was crowned the new crown prince. In late November 1833, Mohammad Mirza summoned the minister of Herat, Yar Muhammad Khan Alakozai, to Mashhad and put him in charge of negotiating a deal with Herat. A treaty was shortly made afterwards, in which Kamran Mirza was required to send one of his sons as a hostage, have the name of the Iranian shah mentioned on coin engravings and Friday prayers, and provide 15,000 toman and 50 rolls of cashmere wool as a "gift".

Even though Herat was officially under Iranian control due to the Iranian shah being mentioned on coin engravings and Friday prayers, the income generated from there had significantly decreased since 1817 and, compared to the more established provinces in Iran, was insignificant.

== Sources ==
- Amanat, Abbas (2003). "Herat vi. The Herat question". In Yarshater, Ehsan (ed.). Encyclopædia Iranica. Vol. XII/2: Hedāyat al-mota'allemin–Herat VII. London and New York: Routledge & Kegan Paul. pp. 219–224. ISBN 978-0-933273-75-7.
- Noelle-Karimi, Christine (2014). The Pearl in its Midst: Herat and the Mapping of Khurasan (15th-19th Centuries). Wien: Austrian Academy of Sciences. ISBN 9783700172024. OCLC 879441128.
