= Battle of Hasan Abdal (1813) =

Battle fought between the Sikh Empire and the Durrani Empire

- Part of the Afghan–Sikh Wars
| Date | 7 June 1813 |
| Location | Hasan Abdal, Punjab, Pakistan 33.819487°N 72.689026°E |
| Result | Afghan victory |

Belligerents
| Durrani Empire | Sikh Empire |

Commanders and leaders
| Fateh Barakzai | Bhayya Singh † |

Strength
| 2,000 | 500 |

Casualties and losses
| 50 | 50 |

The Battle of Hasan Abdal took place on June 7, 1813, between the Sikhs led by Bhayya Ram Singh and Afghans led by Fateh Khan Barakzai at Hasan Abdal.

== The Battle ==
On 7 June 1813, Fateh Khan Barakzai attacked Hasan Abdal with 2,000 Afghans. Hasan Abdal was under Bhayya Ram Singh with 500 militants. The Battle resulted with 50 casualties on both sides and entire weaponry, horses and camels of Sikh soldiers fell into Fateh's hands.

== Aftermath ==
After the battle, Wazir Akbar Khan and Dost Muhammad Khan besieged the Attock fort and cut off all the supplies to it. The city was soon conquered in the same month after the defeat of Durranis at the battle of Haidru.

== See also ==
- Battle of Akora Khattak
- Battle of Kashmir 1814
