= Kamran Mirza Durrani =

Last Durrani ruler of Herat from 1826 to 1842

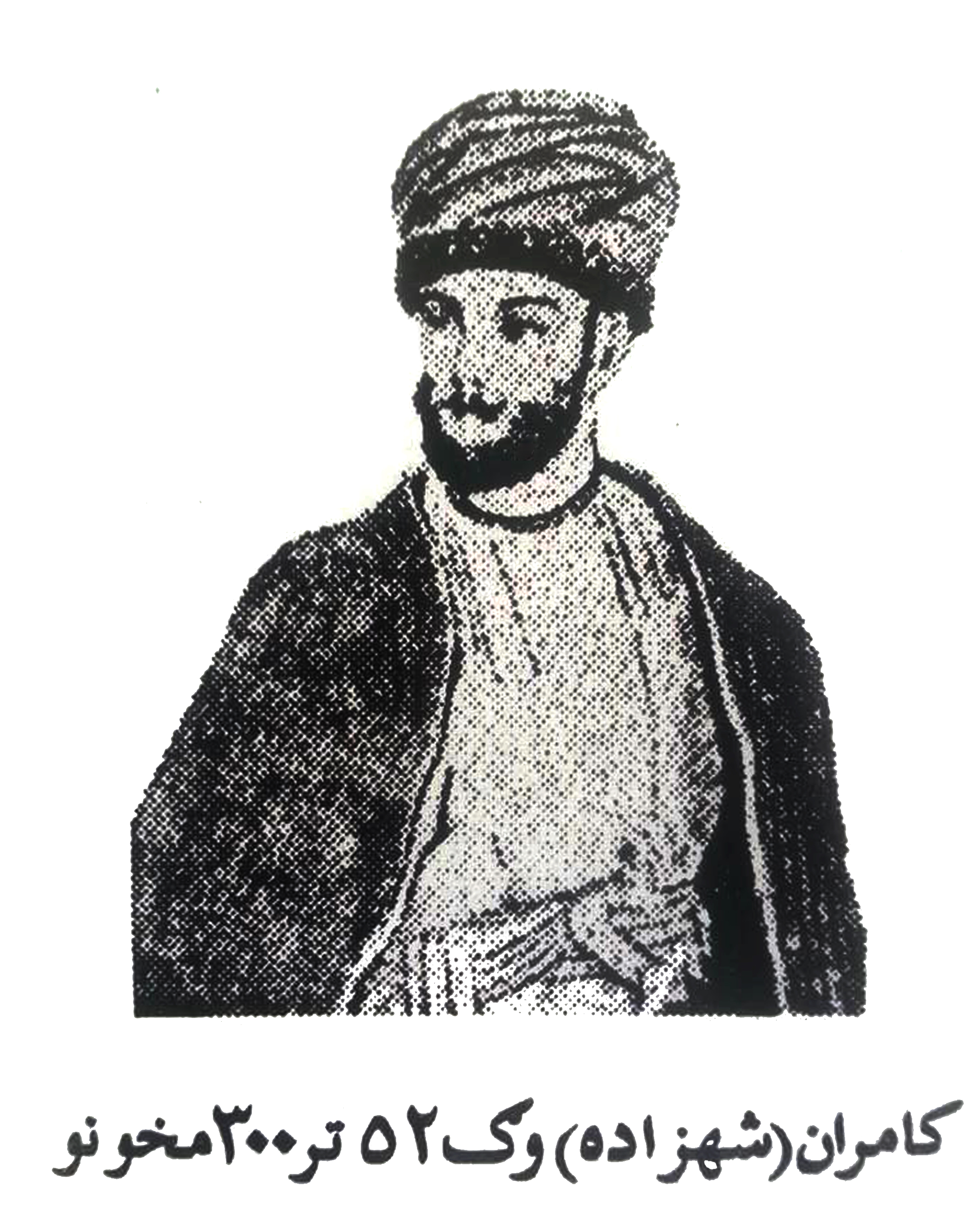

Ruler of Herat
- Tenure: Summer 1826 – 1842
- Predecessor: Mahmud Shah Durrani
- Successor: Yar Muhammad Khan Alakozai
- Died: 1842
- House: Durrani dynasty
- Father: Mahmud Shah Durrani
- Religion: Sunni Islam

Kamran Mirza Durrani (Pashto/Persian: کامران میرزا دورانی) was the last Durrani ruler of Herat from 1826 to 1842. He was the son and successor of Mahmud Shah Durrani (r. 1801–1803, 1809–1818). During Kamran Mirza's early life, a lengthy struggle for control of the capital Kabul occurred between his father and his father's half-brother, Shah Shujah Durrani (r. 1804–1809). In this period, Kamran Mirza governed the city of Kandahar, while his uncle Firuz al-Din Mirza ruled Herat under Iranian suzerainty. When Firuz al-Din rebelled in 1814, Kamran Mirza suppressed the revolt.

In 1818, the Durrani minister Fateh Khan Barakzai deposed Firuz al-Din as ruler of Herat; his troops then plundered the city, and his brother Dost Mohammad Khan raped Kamran Mirza's sister. In revenge, Kamran Mirza captured Fateh Khan and had him executed, which prompted a rebellion by Fateh Khan's brothers. This forced Mahmud Shah and Kamran Mirza to retreat to Herat, the last Durrani stronghold. In 1826, Kamran Mirza became the ruler of Herat after defeating his father, who then withdrew from politics. In an attempt to strengthen Iranian control of Herat, the Iranian crown prince Abbas Mirza besieged Herat in 1833. Although Abbas Mirza died during the siege, Kamran Mirza acknowledged Iran's nominal suzerainty. A second siege took place in 1837–1838 under Mohammad Shah Qajar (r. 1834–1848), but British intervention forced the Iranians to withdraw. After the British embassy left Herat, Kamran Mirza renewed his allegiance to Iran in 1841.

Most assessments are negative about Kamran Mirza's personality and style of government, with European and Persian records typically mentioning his debauchery. Eventually, in 1842, his minister Yar Muhammad Khan Alakozai took full control of state administration and killed him.

== Background ==
Khorasan and its surroundings in the early modern period

Kamran Mirza is referred to as "prince" in both Afghan and Iranian texts, although they use distinct terms. 19th-century Afghan sources use the title of "Shahzada", while the 19th-century Iranian historian Mohammad Taqi Sepehr uses "Mirza". Kamran Mirza was a son of Mahmud Shah Durrani (r. 1801–1803, 1809–1818), and the nephew of Firuz al-Din Mirza Durrani. They belonged to the Afghan Durrani dynasty, established in 1747 by Ahmad Shah Durrani after breaking away from Iranian rule. Besides ruling much of northern India and eastern Iran, Ahmad Shah's domains also included the cities of Kandahar (his capital), Kabul, Herat, and Balkh, corresponding to modern-day Afghanistan. Under the rule of Kamran Mirza's grandfather Timur Shah Durrani (r. 1772–1793), Kabul became the new capital. After Timur Shah's death, the Durrani kingdom started losing territory, including its western part to Qajar Iran in 1795 and the majority of its Indian holdings to the Sikh Empire between 1818 and 1821. Only Kabul and Kandahar remained under the Durrani dynasty's direct rule, while Herat and Balkh were held with limited authority.

During Kamran Mirza's early life, a lengthy struggle for the control of Kabul occurred between his father and the latter's half-brother, Shah Shujah Durrani (r. 1804–1809). During both of Mahmud Shah's rules in Kabul, Kamran Mirza held the governorship of Kandahar. The violent succession of Mahmud Shah had weakened the Durrani kingdom, disrupting the balance of power in Kabul, Kandahar, and Herat. Since Mahmud Shah's succession, Herat had been controlled by his brother Firuz al-Din Mirza.

Iran, which had financed Mahmud Shah in his fight for the Durrani throne, maintained its weak control over Herat despite the intense dynastic struggles within the Durrani family. Located in the historical region of Khorasan, Herat was viewed by Iran's ruling Qajar dynasty as an integral part of the Guarded Domains of Iran. Uncertainty over Herat's status as an Iranian tributary influenced many developments in the early 19th century.

== Career under his father ==
In 1807 and 1814, Firuz al-Din Mirza attempted to rebel against Iran, but was defeated both times. During the second time, he was defeated by Kamran Mirza. Firuz al-Din Mirza fled to the Iranian general Ismail Khan Damghani, who convinced Kamran Mirza to stop pursuing Firuz al-Din Mirza, and had the latter restored in Herat under Iranian suzerainty.

In April 1818, the Durrani minister Fateh Khan Barakzai deposed Firuz al-Din Mirza and took over Herat. During this incident, soldiers entered the city, raping and plundering the inhabitants. Fateh Khan and his brother Dost Mohammad Khan entered Firuz al-Din Mirza's harem, raped every woman who attracted their attention and removed their jewelry and clothes. This included Kamran Mirza's sister, who was raped by Dost Mohammad Khan. After Kamran Mirza was informed of the incident by a letter from his sister, he vowed to avenge her. When Dost Mohammad Khan found out about this, he fled to Kashmir. In Herat, the Iranian ambassador was driven out by Fateh Khan, who instructed him to notify the Iranian ruler Fath-Ali Shah Qajar (r. 1797–1834) that Mahmud Shah had assumed power. Worried that Iran would use this as a pretext to conquer Herat, Mahmud Shah quickly sent Kamran Mirza to Fath-Ali Shah's camp with a letter apologizing for the Iranian ambassador's removal and condemning Fateh Khan's behavior. Fath-Ali Shah pressed Kamran Mirza to prove his friendship by either blinding Fateh Khan or surrendering him as a prisoner.

Once back in Kabul, Kamran Mirza informed Mahmud Shah about Fateh Khan's insubordination, the plundering of Herat, and the rape of Mahmud Shah's daughter. Kamran Mirza was subsequently ordered to capture Herat and punish Fateh Khan. Kamran Mirza sent messages to Fateh Khan, stating that he had come to deliver Mahmud Shah's congratulations on his victory over Iran, hiding his real purpose. In Herat, he acted in an accommodating manner, making Fateh Khan feel welcome and persuading him to share breakfast with him every day. Fateh Khan disregarded the warnings from his advisors that Kamran Mirza was untrustworthy. One morning, Fateh Khan attended breakfast with Kamran Mirza, only to find himself surrounded by enemies. After enduring their insults, he tried to leave but was attacked, blinded with a dagger, and imprisoned. Days later, his eyes were gouged out, and the wounds cauterized.

Some months later, Fateh Khan was brought before Mahmud Shah in the town of Ghazni, where he was assured that his life would be spared if he summoned his brothers to personally swear allegiance to Mahmud Shah. He declined because he was afraid his brothers would get the same treatment as him. As a result, he was subsequently executed, which was politically devastating for the Durrani dynasty. His brothers, holding important Durrani governorships, rebelled upon hearing of his death.

=== Conflict with his father ===
The rebellion forced Mahmud Shah, the rest of his family (including Kamran Mirza) and a handful of loyal followers to withdraw to Herat, which became the last stronghold of the Durrani dynasty. Removed from Herat's fortress by Kamran Mirza in 1819, Mahmud Shah sought safety at the Shrine of Khwaja Abd Allah in the Gazurgah village. He subsequently gathered an army at Maymana and laid siege to Herat. After several months of deadlock, he made an agreement with Kamran Mirza that he would renounce any control over the government in return for being allowed to return to Herat.

In July 1826, Kamran Mirza fell into another conflict with his father and requested direct aid from Hasan Ali Mirza, the Iranian prince and governor of Khorasan, who had earlier supplied him with 500 cavalry soldiers. Before the latter and his forces arrived, Kamran Mirza defeated Mahmud Shah. Following that, Hasan Ali Mirza was invited inside the city by Kamran Mirza and his nobles, who also gave him the keys to the fortress and the city. Hasan Ali Mirza took advantage of the situation to establish a stronger Iranian presence in Herat. He stationed his son Arghun Mirza at the head of 5,000 cavalry soldiers and three cannons, returning to Mashhad in August 1826. Mahmud Shah stepped away from politics, while Kamran Mirza became the new ruler of Herat.

== Reign ==
=== First siege of Herat ===
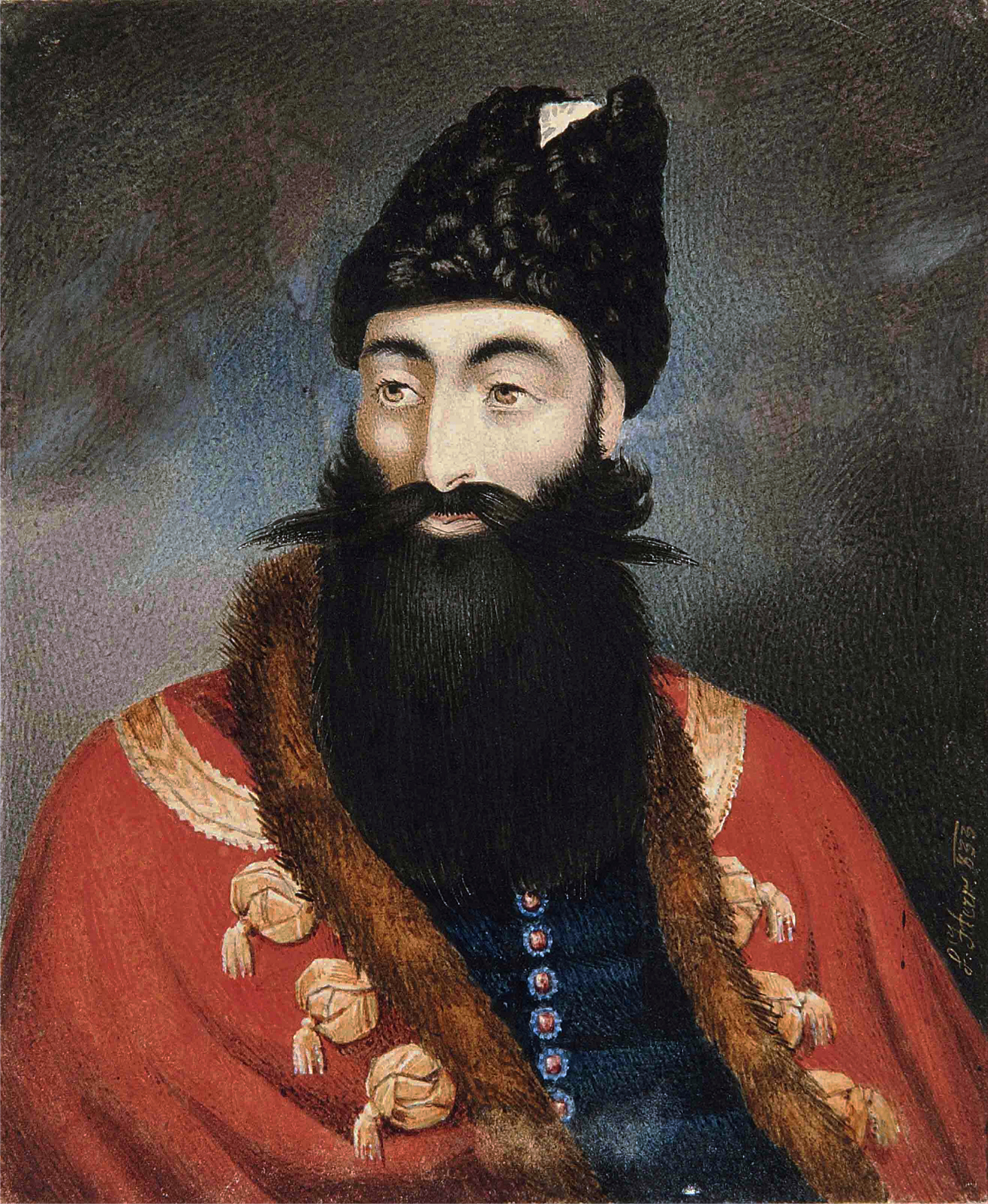
Portrait of Abbas Mirza, who ordered the Siege of Herat in 1833

After Hasan Ali Mirza was summoned back to Tehran in January 1827, his achievements were reversed after less than three months under the governorship of his son Hulaku Khan. Less than a decade later, widespread anti-Iranian tensions in Herat and Britain's increasing engagement in Afghanistan started to heavily endanger Iran's rule over Herat. The British East India Company had started to advocate for Herat's autonomy as a buffer state between northwestern India, Russia and Iran, even though they had previously supported Iranian rule over the city. In late 1831, the Iranian crown prince Abbas Mirza received the governorship of Khorasan, which led to growing hostilities with Kamran Mirza. The latter received an ultimatum from Abbas Mirza at the beginning of 1833 with two options. He could have the name of the Iranian shah mentioned on coin engravings and in Friday prayers, pay taxes, and release hostages. Alternatively, he could relinquish Herat and appear at the Iranian court.

Kamran Mirza responded by offering a "gift" of 15,000 toman in gold coins, warning Abbas Mirza that demanding more would mean war. In the summer of 1833, Abbas Mirza sent an army to besiege Herat. Abbas Mirza wanted to capture Herat to show his military capabilities, but his advance also served the objectives of the Russian Empire. Iran's control of Herat was seen by the Russians as a threat to British India and a challenge to British objectives in Afghanistan. The Iranian army against Herat was led by Abbas Mirza's sons Mohammad Mirza and Khosrow Mirza, as well as his minister Abol-Qasem Qa'em-Maqam.

As a result, Kamran Mirza made an alliance with the British, whose representatives convinced him to oppose a military takeover by Iran. Capturing a portion of Iranian territory in Sistan was something he also considered. Mohammad Mirza was forced to end the siege and return to Tehran after learning of Abbas Mirza's death in Mashhad in November 1833. There, he was crowned the new crown prince. In late November 1833, Mohammad Mirza summoned the minister of Herat, Yar Muhammad Khan Alakozai, to Mashhad and put him in charge of negotiating a deal with Herat. A treaty was shortly made afterwards, in which Kamran Mirza was required to send one of his sons as a hostage, have the name of the Iranian shah mentioned on coin engravings and Friday prayers, and provide 15,000 toman and 50 rolls of cashmere wool as a "gift".

Even though Herat was officially under Iranian control, the income generated from there had significantly decreased since 1817 and, compared to the more established provinces in Iran, was insignificant.

=== Second siege of Herat ===
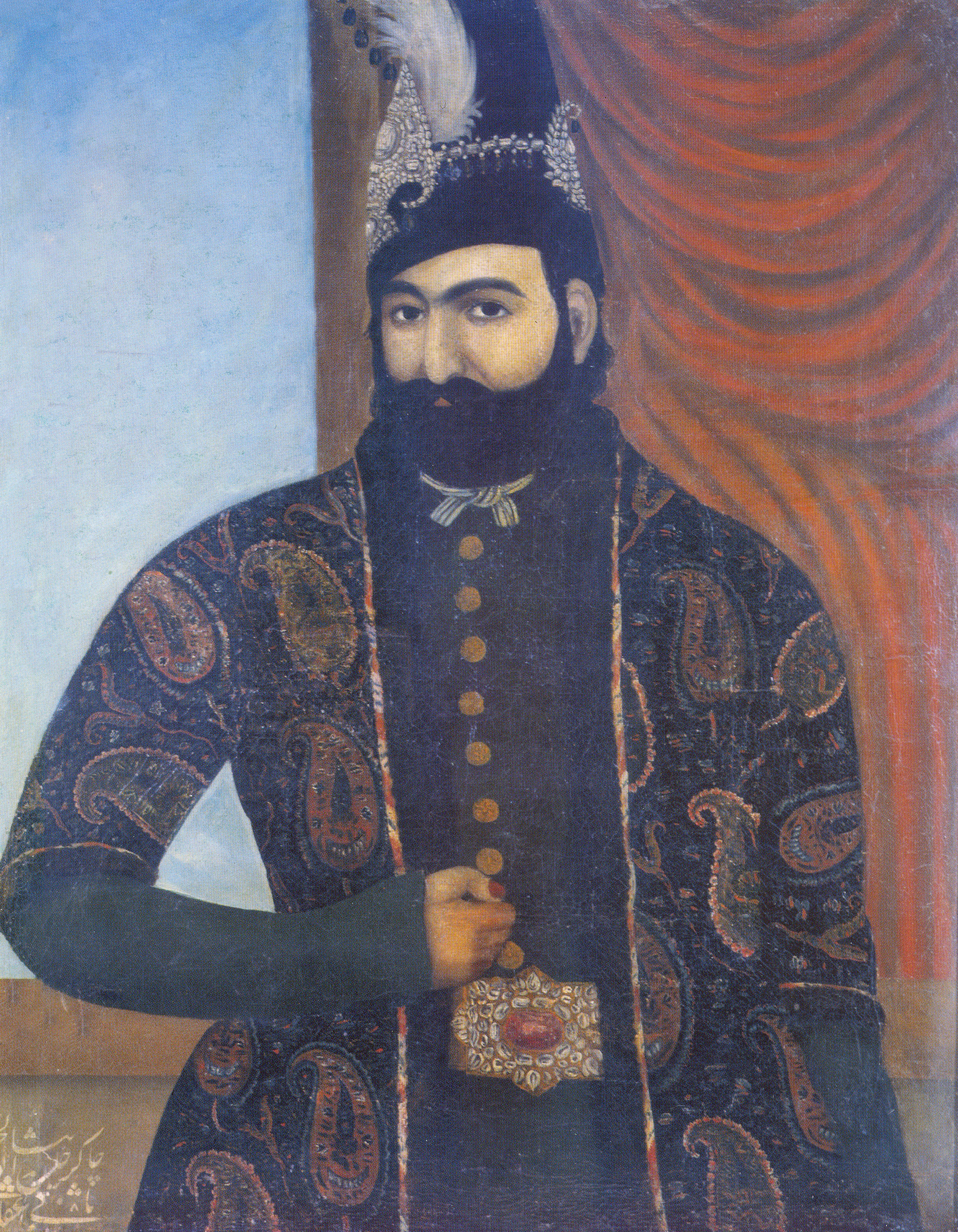
Portrait of Mohammad Shah Qajar, who ordered the siege of Herat in 1837

On 7 November 1834, Mohammad Mirza (now known as Mohammad Shah) succeeded Fath-Ali Shah and quickly renewed Abbas Mirza's plans for Khorasan. He insisted that Kamran Mirza abandon the title of shah, mention his name on coin engravings and Friday prayers, and pay an annual fee. Kamran Mirza declined, claiming that it was his right due to his ancestor Saddu Khan being named Mir-i Afghaniha and given the title of sultan by an Iranian ruler. He added that "the Afghans will never permit any other person to rule over them so long as a single Afghan remains alive in Herat."

Being the ruler of a Shia Muslim state, it was also important for Mohammad Shah to ensure the safety of the Shias in Herat and the rest of Khorasan, such as against the attacks and enslavement by Turkmens and Sunni Muslim uymaq. (Note: Uymaq refers to semi-nomadic Sunni tribes who spoke Persian.) Iranian accusations surfaced against Kamran Mirza, claiming his territory had become a base for raids that extended as far as Sabzevar. Additionally, Kamran Mirza became involved in areas deemed to be Iranian territory: he launched an offensive against the town of Lash-Juvain and directly pressured the towns of Khaf and Qaen for tribute. The clergy in Iran backed and promoted the government's stance on the need for a campaign to Herat. Hajji Ebrahim, an Islamic scholar in Isfahan, proclaimed jihad against Kamran Mirza in April 1836. In May 1837, Mohammad Shah was petitioned by the clergy in Mashhad to capture the Shia-populated domains of Kamran Mirza. Kamran Mirza characterized Mohammad Shah's imminent offensive as an attempt to exterminate Sunni Muslims, and appealed to other Afghan chiefs for support.

A military victory over Herat was seen by Mohammad Shah as essential for both securing his kingship and appeasing Simonitch, the Russian envoy to his court. Mohammad Shah ordered the gathering of troops in July 1837, disregarding advise by John McNeill, the British envoy in Tehran. On 21 November 1837, Mohammad Shah's forces besieged Herat.

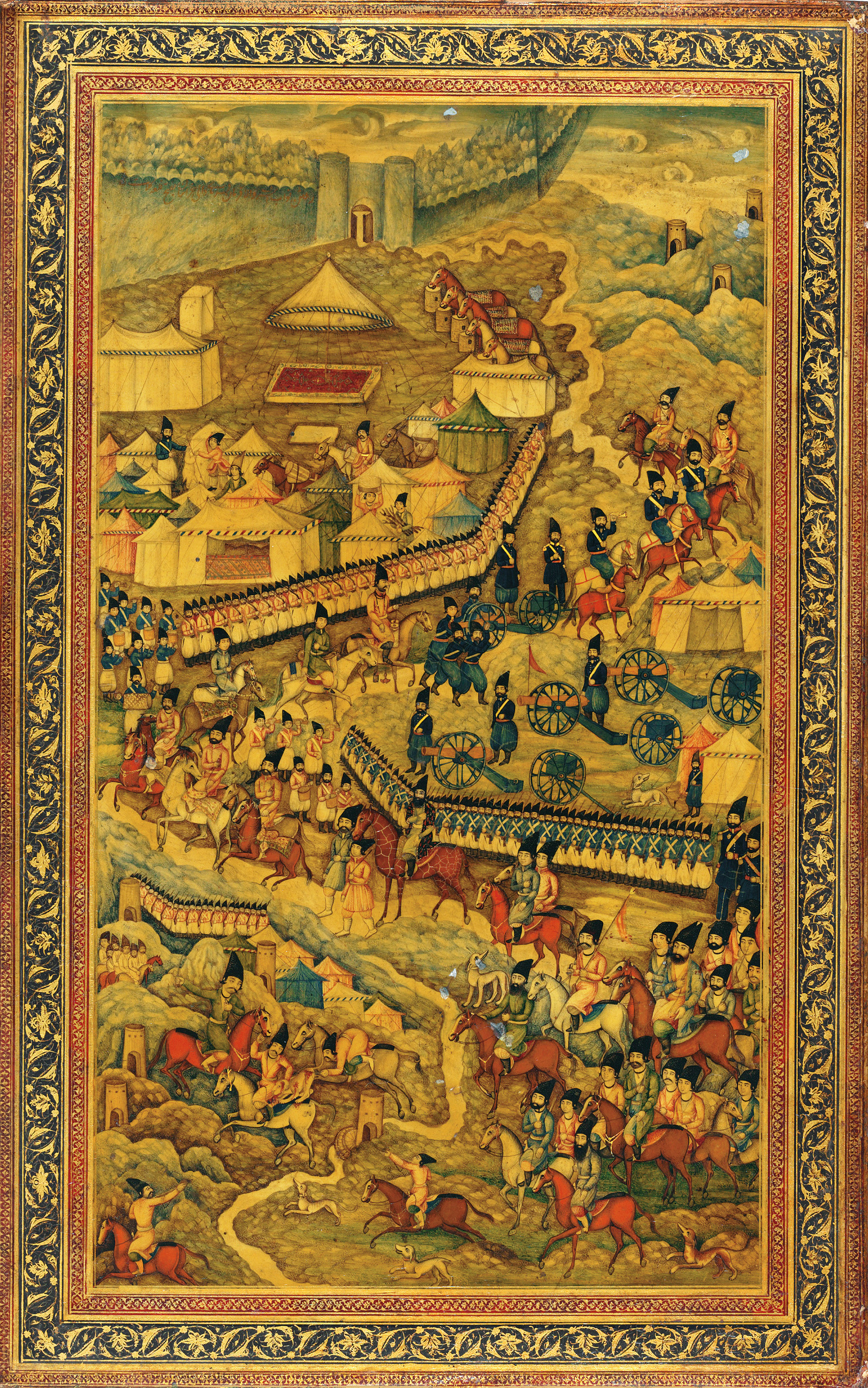
An Iranian lacquer book cover depicting preparations for the 1837–1838 siege of Herat, dated c. 1865

The 1814 treaty between Iran and Britain stated that the latter would not interfere in any conflict between Iran and the Afghans, and therefore the Iranian siege of Herat put Britain in a difficult situation. In an attempt to convince Mohammad Shah to change his mind, McNeill dispatched his military secretary Charles Stoddart to go with the Iranian troops. The Iranian army, consisting of 30,000 soldiers and 90,000 camp followers, only succeeded in cutting off supplies to Herat. There has been debate on the effectiveness of their heavy amount of artillery fire against Herat. In romanticized Iranian reports, not even a bird or crow would land on the city's outer walls due to the intensity of the bombardment. British reports alleged that hundreds of rounds of ammunition were wasted in the early phases of the siege, despite attesting to its strength.

Conflicts among Iranian commanders hindered the siege, including prime minister Haji Mirza Aqasi's decision to block only two of Herat's five gates in the first two months. The siege barely advanced by the spring of 1838. The city walls resisted the frequent artillery barrages, and the Iranian attacks were repelled. The British officer Eldred Pottinger—who had by coincidence been in Herat at the start of the siege—helped strengthen Herat's defenses through his funds and knowledge. In British imperial mythology, he was considered to have single-handedly helped Herat survive the siege, and was thus called the "Hero of Herat". According to the modern historian Jonathan L. Lee; "He did indeed rally Herat's dispirited defenders and organize its defences, but his real achievement was cajoling Shah Kamran and Wazir Yar Muhammad Khan not to surrender."

In April 1838, McNeill volunteered to act as a mediator between Iran and Kamran Mirza at Mohammad Shah's camp. His attempts to promote peace are described in Iranian accounts as a facade to support Herat's interests. They claimed that McNeill went into Herat twice to support Kamran Mirza and Yar Muhammad Khan both financially and morally, rather than pursuing peace negotiations. According to McNeill, Mohammad Shah's stance on Herat's acknowledgment of Iranian suzerainty was the reason why the negotiations failed. Reasoning became impossible when Kamran Mirza started demanding the evacuation of the town of Ghuriyan, which had been recently captured by another Iranian force, led by the governor of Khorasan, Asef al-Dowleh.

On 3 June 1838, McNeill severed diplomatic ties with Iran and left Mohammad Shah's camp after failing to persuade the latter to make peace with Herat. McNeill had warned Mohammad Shah to get ready for war with Britain, claiming that the Iranian consent to Russian assistance for the siege of Herat was against the terms of the 1814 treaty. However, a month earlier, a British naval mission had been sent to capture Iran's Kharg Island, so the war had already unofficially begun. On 24 June, with the backing of Russian officers, Mohammad Shah's forces attempted to storm Herat, but were repelled six days after, suffering many casualties.

Arriving at the Iranian camp on August 11, Stoddart delivered a letter to Mohammad Shah, which stated that the occupation of Kharg would persist until the siege of Herat ended and Aqasi issued a formal apology for the mistreatment of a British envoy. On 9 September 1838, Mohammad Shah ended the siege. Ghuriyan was also soon evacuated by Iran due to pressure from both Russia and Britain. Despite this, Mohammad Shah described his expedition as a victory in fixing Iran's eastern frontiers in an effort to lessen the Iranian losses. He upheld his claims to Herat, despite not having the funds for another military expedition.

=== Later reign and death ===
Herat's surroundings suffered greatly during the siege. Every village within a twelve-mile radius were reportedly devastated and had no population left. The British envoy D'Arcy Todd noted in October 1839 that Herat was still experiencing the effects of the siege. The country was reduced to a "uninhabited waste" by the Iranian army: most of the farmers had left, cattle, corn and agricultural tools had been destroyed or taken away. The slave trade was fueled by the lack of food. The French traveler Josephe-Pierre Ferrier reported that many residents sold themselves to the Turkmens in order to ensure that their families survived due to the dire circumstances.

Herat was prepared to restore its previous relationship with the Iranian government. In early 1839, Yar Muhammad Khan turned back to Iran, asking for assistance against Dost Mohammad Khan. In February 1841, Kamran Mirza and Yar Muhammad Khan reinstated their earlier promises of allegiance to Iran following the British embassy's departure from Herat. Kamran Mirza, in a letter to Mohammad Shah, officially declared Herat as a part of Khorasan and consequently, to Iran; "It is obvious that Herat is a part of Khurasan... and that the king has left this realm at our disposal. I hereby attest to the fact that Herat is connected with Iran." Despite their formal pledge of allegiance, the Iranian evacuation of Ghuriyan on 31 March 1841 played a key role in separating the interests of Iran and Herat. In 1842, Kamran Mirza was overthrown and killed by Yar Muhammad Khan, who considered him an annoyance and had been slowly reducing his authority. This marked the end of the Durrani dynasty.

== Personality ==
Some assessments, such as the one by the 19th-century British historian George William Forrest, are positive about Kamran's personality and rule. However, European and Persian records typically refer to Kamran Mirza's traits as being related to debauchery. The 19th-century Afghan historian Sultan Muhammad Khan Khalis considered Kamran Mirza to have been the embodiment of the Durrani dynasty's decline. He considered Kamran Mirza to have been a despot, who forced local traders to give money and had brides kidnapped. Kamran Mirza was also completely reliant on Yar Muhammad Khan to run his administration.

== Sources ==
- Amanat, Abbas (2003). "Herat vi. The Herat question". In Yarshater, Ehsan (ed.). Encyclopædia Iranica (Online ed.). Encyclopædia Iranica Foundation. ISBN 978-0710090959.
- Barfield, Thomas (2020). "Afghanistan since 1747". In Fleet, Kate; Krämer, Gudrun; Matringe, Denis; Nawas, John; Rowson, Everett (eds.). Encyclopaedia of Islam (3rd ed.). Brill Online. ISSN 1873-9830.
- Gholami, Rahim; Heravi, Najib Mayel (2015). "Afghanistan". In Madelung, Wilferd; Daftary, Farhad (eds.). Encyclopaedia Islamica Online. Brill Online. ISSN 1875-9831.
- Hambly, Gavin R. G. (1999). "Ferrier, Josephe-Pierre". In Yarshater, Ehsan (ed.). Encyclopædia Iranica (Online ed.). Encyclopædia Iranica Foundation. ISBN 978-0710090959.
- Lee, Jonathan L. (2019). Afghanistan: A History from 1260 to the Present. Reaktion Books. ISBN 978-1-78914-010-1.
- Noelle-Karimi, Christine (2010). "Kāmrān b. Shah Maḥmud". In Yarshater, Ehsan (ed.). Encyclopædia Iranica (Online ed.). Encyclopædia Iranica Foundation. ISBN 978-0710090959.
- Noelle-Karimi, Christine (2014). The Pearl in its Midst: Herat and the Mapping of Khurasan (15th-19th Centuries). Austrian Academy of Sciences. ISBN 978-3700172024.
- Sami'i, Majid (2015). "Aḥmad Shāh Durrānī". In Madelung, Wilferd; Daftary, Farhad (eds.). Encyclopaedia Islamica Online. Brill Online. ISSN 1875-9831.
