= Mahmud Shah Durrani =

Fourth Durrani emperor (r. 1801–1803; 1809–1818)

Mahmud Shah Durrani محمود شاه درانی
- King, Pearl of the Pearls (Note: Persian: شاه در دران, romanized: Šāh Durr-i Durrān)
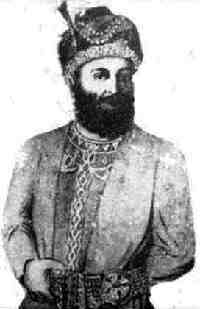
- Portrait of Mahmud Shah, 1818

Shah of the Durrani Empire
- 1st reign: 25 July 1801 – 13 July 1803
- Predecessor: Zaman Shah Durrani
- Successor: Shuja Shah Durrani
- 2nd reign: 3 May 1809 – 1818
- Predecessor: Shuja Shah Durrani
- Successor: Ali Shah Durrani

Emir of Herat
- Reign: 1818 – 1826
- Successor: Kamran Shah Durrani
- Born: c. 1769; Kabul, Durrani Empire
- Died: 18 April 1829 (aged about 60); Herat, Emirate of Afghanistan
- Dynasty: Durrani
- Father: Timur Shah Durrani
- Mother: Unnamed Yusufzai lady
- Religion: Sunni Islam

Mahmud Shah Durrani (Note: Pashto: محمود شاه دراني, romanized: Mahmud Šāh Durrāni [mɑ.mud̪/mäh.mud̪ ʃɑ(h) d̪u(ɾ).ɾɑ.ni]; Persian: تیمور شاه درانی, romanized: Mahmūd Shāh Durrānī [mɑː.múːd̪/mäɦ.múːd̪ ʃɑː(ʱ) d̪ʊɾ.ɾɑː.níː]) (born Mahmud Mirza Durrani; c. 1769 – 18 April 1829) was the fourth ruler of the Durrani Empire. He reigned from 1801 to 1803 and again from 1809 to 1818. From 1818 to 1829, he ruled Herat. He belonged to the Sadozai branch of the Popalzai subclan of the Durrani Pashtuns. He was the son of Timur Shah Durrani and the grandson of Ahmad Shah Durrani.

== Reign ==
Mahmud Shah Durrani was the half-brother of his predecessor, Zaman Shah. On July 25, 1801, Zaman Shah was deposed, and Mahmud Shah ascended to ruler-ship. He had a chequered career, being deposed in 1803, restored in 1809, and finally deposed again in 1818.

== Struggles with the Barakzais ==
The elder brother of Dost Mohammad Khan, the chief of the Barakzai, Fateh Khan, took an important part in raising Mahmud Shah Durrani to the sovereignty of Afghanistan in 1800 and in restoring him to the throne in 1809. The son of Mahmud Shah Durrani, Shahzada Kamran Durrani, engaged in political conflicts with Fateh Khan, the brother of Dost Muhammad Khan. Mahmud Shah had Fateh Khan assassinated in 1818. The assassination of Fateh Khan Barakzai, incurred the enmity of the Barakzai tribe and contributed significantly to the fall of the Durrani Empire. After a bloody conflict, Mahmud Shah was deprived of all his possessions except Herat. The rest of his dominions were divided among Fateh Khan's brothers. King Mahmud Shah Durrani died in 1829. The country was then ruled by Shuja Shah Durrani; another of his half-brothers.

== See also ==
- Durrani Empire

== Notes ==
Regnal titles
Preceded by Zaman Shah	Emir of Afghanistan; 25 July 1801 – 13 July 1803	Succeeded by Shoja Shah
Preceded by Shoja Shah	Emir of Afghanistan; 3 May 1809 – 1818	Succeeded by Sultan Ali Shah
