= Abraham Roberts =

British military officer (1784–1873)

General Sir Abraham Roberts GCB
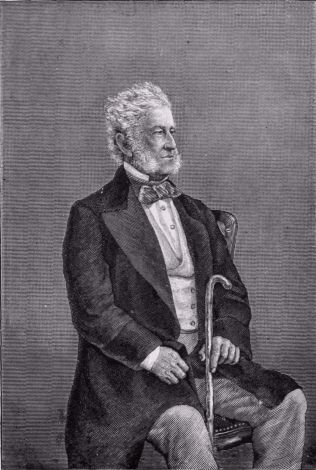
- Sir Abraham Roberts
- Born: 11 April 1784; Waterford, Kingdom of Ireland
- Died: 28 December 1873 (aged 89)
- Relatives: Frederick Roberts, 1st Earl Roberts (son); Aileen Roberts, 2nd Countess Roberts (granddaughter); Frederick Roberts (grandson)
- Military career
- Allegiance: United Kingdom
- Branch: British East India Company
- Rank: General
- Unit: 1st Bengal European Regiment
- Commands: 1st Bengal European Regiment; Lahore Division
- Conflicts: First Afghan War
- Awards: Knight Grand Cross of the Order of the Bath

General Sir Abraham Roberts (11 April 1784 – 28 December 1873) was a British East India Company Army general who served nearly 50 years in India.

Roberts had two sons, who both obtained the highest ranks in the British Army. One son and a grandson would win the Victoria Cross, the highest decoration for bravery in the face of the enemy in the British Army.

== Early life ==
Abraham Roberts was a member of a famous Waterford family. He was the son of Anne (Sandys) and The Reverend John Roberts, a magistrate in County Waterford and a rector of Passage East.

== Career ==
General Sir Abraham Roberts gained the rank of colonel in the service of the Honourable East India Company and was the commander of the 1st Bengal European Regiment and the Lahore Division. He fought in the First Afghan War.

Roberts was invested as a Knight Grand Cross of the Order of the Bath (GCB). He left India in 1853 to live in Ireland with his second wife, who outlived him. He also had a home in Bristol, 25 Royal York Crescent, Bristol.

From 1862 until his death, he was Colonel of the 101st Regiment of Foot (Royal Bengal Fusiliers).

== Family ==
He married Frances Isabella Ricketts, daughter of George Poyntz Ricketts, on 20 July 1820. On the death of his first wife, he married Isabella Bunbury, daughter of Abraham Bunbury, on 2 August 1830.

=== Children with Frances Isabella Ricketts ===
- Frances Eliza Roberts
- Maria Isabella Roberts
- Major General George Ricketts Roberts

=== Children with Isabella Bunbury ===
- Harriet Mercer Roberts
- Field Marshal The 1st Earl Roberts

== Arms ==
Coat of arms of Abraham Roberts
Notes Confirmed by John Bernard Burke, Ulster King of Arms, 27 June 1865. Crest A lion rampant Or armed and langued Gules charged on the shoulder with an Eastern crown of the last and holding in the dexter paw a sword the blade wavy Argent hilt and pommel Gold. Escutcheon Azure three estoiles Or on a chief wavy of the second an Eastern crown Gules. Motto Virtute Et Valore
