= Earl Roberts =

Extinct earldom in the Peerage of the United Kingdom

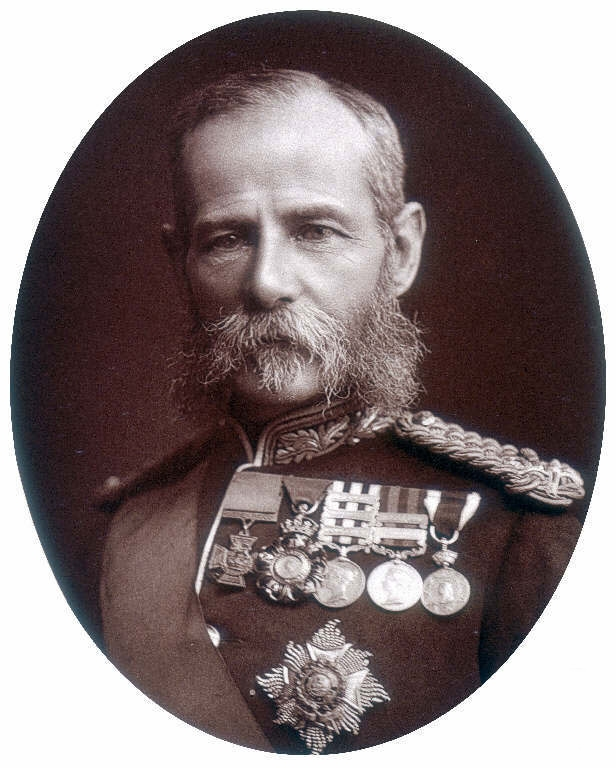
Frederick Roberts, 1st Earl Roberts.

Earl Roberts, of Kandahar in Afghanistan and Pretoria in the Transvaal Colony and of the City of Waterford, was a title in the Peerage of the United Kingdom. It was created in 1901 for Field Marshal Frederick Roberts, 1st Baron Roberts. He had already been created Baron Roberts, of Kandahar in Afghanistan, and of the City of Waterford, in 1892, and was made Viscount St Pierre at the same time as he was given the earldom. These titles were also in the Peerage of the United Kingdom.

The barony was created with normal remainder to the heirs male of his body while the viscountcy and earldom were created with special remainders to his daughters and the heirs male of their bodies, as his sons had already predeceased him. The barony became extinct on Lord Roberts's death in 1914. He was succeeded in the viscountcy and earldom according to the special remainders by his eldest daughter, the second Countess. She died unmarried and was succeeded by her younger sister, the third Countess. The latter’s son and only child Lieutenant Frederick Roberts Alexander Lewin was killed in action in the Second World War and consequently the viscountcy and earldom became extinct on the third Countess’s death in 1955.

== Family ==
Frederick Roberts was the son of Sir Abraham Roberts, who was also a distinguished soldier and general.

== Earl Roberts (1901) ==
- Frederick Sleigh Roberts, 1st Earl Roberts (1832–1914)
  - Aileen Mary Roberts, 2nd Countess Roberts (1870–1944)
  - The Hon. Frederick Hugh Sherston Roberts (1872–1899)
  - Ada Edwina Stewart Lewin, 3rd Countess Roberts (1875–1955)
    - Frederick Roberts Alexander Lewin (1915–1940)

== Arms ==
Coat of arms of Earl Roberts
Coronet A Coronet of an Earl Crest A lion rampant or, holding in its paw an ancient sword in bend proper, and charged on the shoulder with an eastern crown gules. Escutcheon Azure, three stars or; on a chief wavy or, an eastern crown gules. Supporters Dexter, a soldier of the 92nd (Gordon Highlanders) Regiment; sinister, a soldier of the 5th Ghurka Rifles, each costumed and accoutred proper. Motto VIRTUTE ET VALOR; By virtue and valor
