= Englemere House =

Coordinates: 51.407933°N 0.689412°W

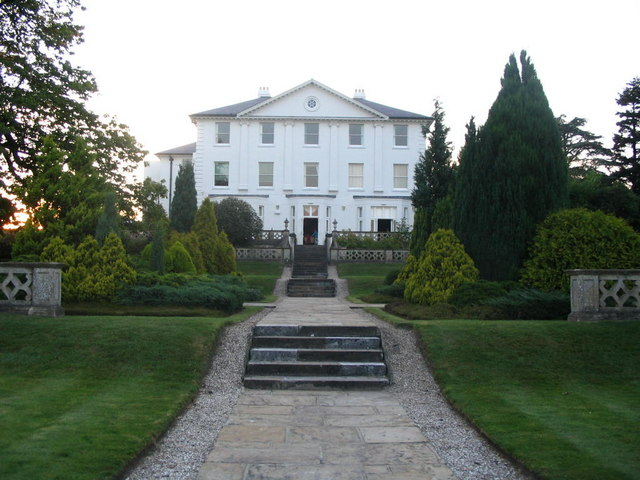
Englemere House

Englemere House is a large country house near Ascot in Berkshire.

== History ==
Built around 1815 in the Italianate style, the house was bought by Field Marshal Lord Roberts in 1903 and remained his home until his death in 1914. Aileen Roberts, 2nd Countess Roberts continued to live in the house long after the field marshal's death. It went on to become the home of Princess Helena Victoria and Princess Marie Louise during the Second World War and then became the head office of the Chartered Institute of Building in 1971. The Institute moved out in 2013 and the building is being redeveloped for residential use.
