= Kabul Field Force =

British force during the Second Afghan War

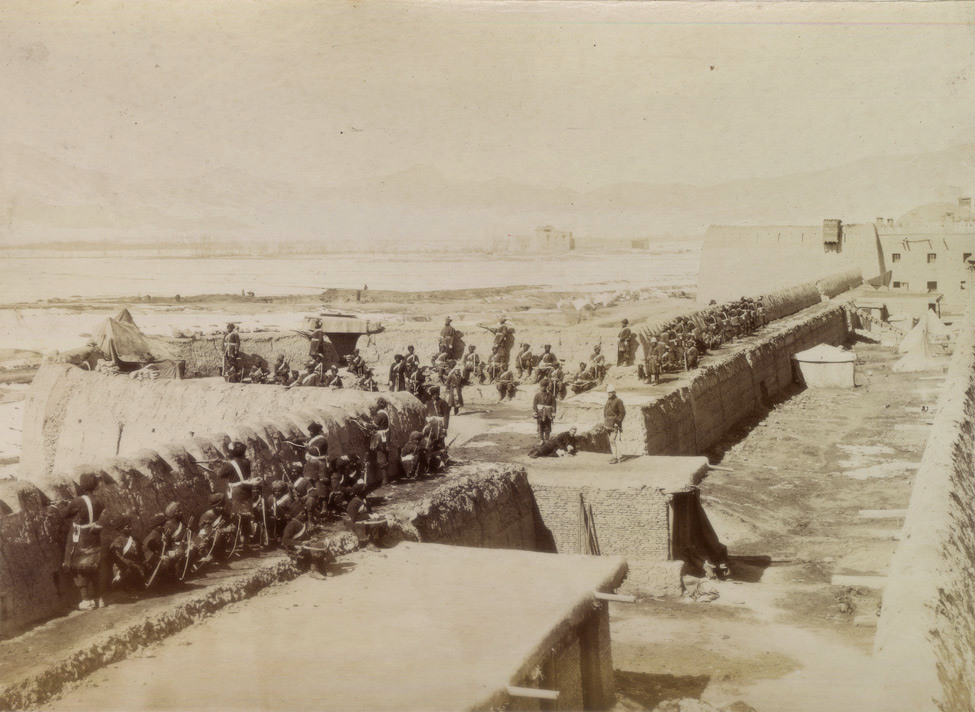
- Kabul Field Force at the Sherpur Cantonment in Kabul, 1879
- Active: 1879-1880
- Disbanded: 1880
- Country: United Kingdom; British Raj
- Allegiance: British Empire
- Size: Field force
- Engagements: Second Anglo-Afghan War: Battle of Charasiab; Siege of the Sherpur Cantonment

Commanders
- Notable commanders: Major General Frederick Roberts, VC

The Kabul Field Force was a field force created in September 1879 during the Second Anglo-Afghan War, under the command of General Frederick Roberts. It combined British Army and British Indian Army regiments, and initially numbered around 7,500 men, but later reached about 14,000.

The second phase of the Second Anglo-Afghan War was set in motion by the murder of the British envoy Pierre Louis Napoleon Cavagnari and his staff in Kabul on 3 September 1879. The only British troops then in Afghanistan was the Kurram Valley Field Force, commanded by Roberts. This was speedily reinforced by new units and ordered to advance on Kabul, with the objective of taking punitive action.

With twenty field guns and 7,500 men, infantry, cavalry, artillery, and Sappers & Miners. Roberts' force moved up the Kurram Valley and towards Kabul, winning various skirmishes and receiving envoys from Emir Ayub Khan denying responsibility for the murders. By early October the force was at Charasiab, twelve miles from Kabul, where 8,000 Afghans were dug in. Here Roberts' force defeated the Afghan Army at the Battle of Charasiab on 6 October 1879. The subsequent capture of Kabul on 13 October was described by Howard Hensman, correspondent of the Daily News of London.

On 11 November, a fall of snow caused the death of some of the force's elephants. By mid-November, the Force was divided into two Divisions, the first at and around Kabul, the 2nd on the Khyber line. The 1st Division contained 100 British Army officers and 2,783 other ranks, plus 71 Indian Army officers and 5,060 other ranks; while the 2nd Division contained 90 British Army officers and 2,385 other ranks, plus 118 Indian Army officers and 8,590 other ranks.

In December 1879, 10,000 Afghans rose against the occupiers, but Roberts was well prepared and was victorious at the Battle of Sherpur. In an action at Killa Kazi on 11 December 1879, James Adams, a chaplain to the Force, rescued some men of the 9th Lancers from a ditch while under enemy fire, for which he was later awarded the Victoria Cross.

On 1 May 1880 Lieutenant General Sir Donald Stewart arrived in Kabul from Kandahar with a further 7,200 troops, taking over command of the Kabul Field Force from Roberts the following day. This combined force was now designated the Northern Afghanistan Field Force. With the pro-British Emir Abdur Rahman Khan installed, British Forces were preparing to leave Kabul. However, after the July 1880 British defeat at the Battle of Maiwand in southern Afghanistan, Stewart ordered Roberts with 10,000 men to march on Kandahar – creating a separate Kabul-Kandahar Field Force. The Northern Afghanistan Field Force, still commanded by Stewart, finally returned to India in August 1880 via the Khyber Pass. With no British-led troops remaining in northern Afghanistan, the Northern Afghanistan Field Force was then disbanded.

== See also ==
- Kurram Valley Field Force
- Battle of Charasiab
- Siege of the Sherpur Cantonment
