= Battle of Ahmed Khel =

1880 battle of the Second Anglo-Afghan War

- Part of the Second Anglo-Afghan War
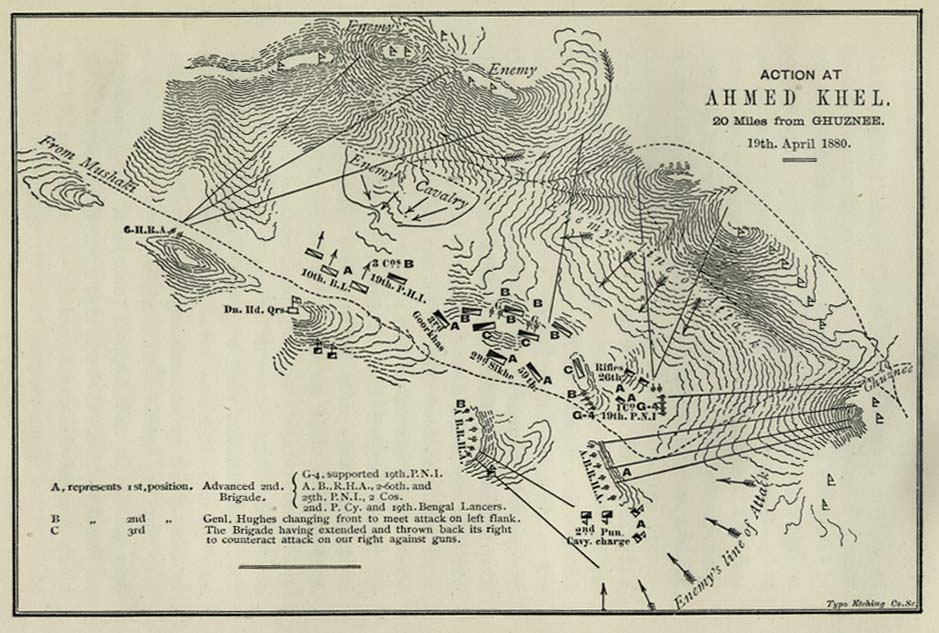
- Map of the battlefield
Date	19 April 1880
Location	Ahmed Khel, Afghanistan
Result	British sikh allies victory

Belligerents
(United Kingdom of Great Britain and Ireland) British Empire: (British Raj) India	Afghanistan

Commanders and leaders
(United Kingdom of Great Britain and Ireland) Donald Stewart	Unknown

Strength
7,200 Anglo-Indian troops	12,000–15,000 tribal warriors

Casualties and losses
17 killed 124 wounded	Estimated 2,000–3,000 killed

The Battle of Ahmed Khel took place during the Second Anglo-Afghan War. It was fought on 19 April 1880, on the road between Kandahar and Kabul in central Afghanistan between Afghan tribesmen and soldiers of the British Empire, including forces from both British and Indian armies.

On 27 March 1880, Lieutenant General Donald Stewart, with a force of 7,200, left Kandahar in south Afghanistan to march to Kabul, in order to reinforce General Roberts, the British commander in the Afghan capital. During the journey, the country was largely deserted, creating difficulties in supplying the troops, while the column was shadowed by a large force of Afghan tribesmen.

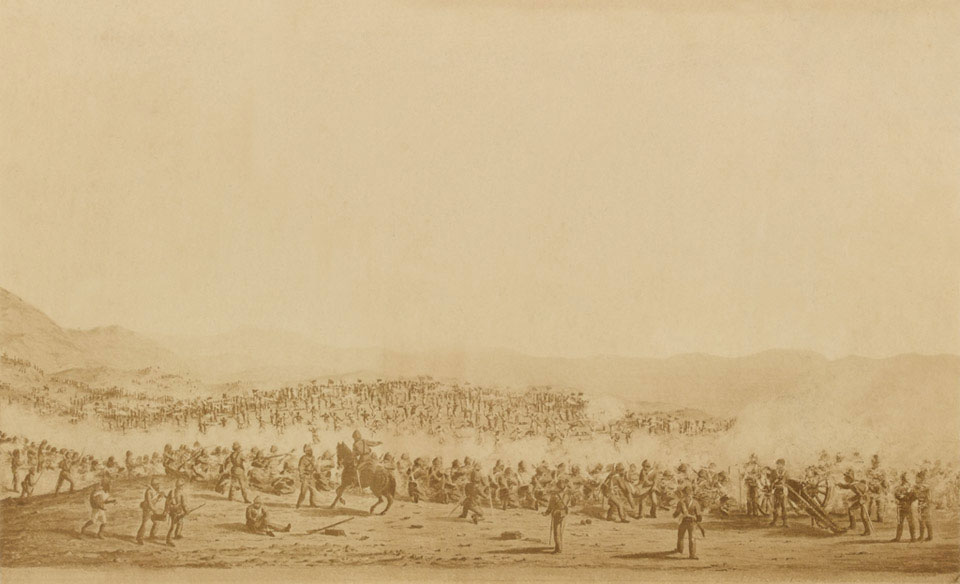
The 3d Goorkhas, and 59th Foot, fight it out at the battle of Ahmed Kheyl (sic)

On 19 April 1880, the column was near the village of Ahmed Khel, about 23 miles (37 km) from Ghazni. Here, at a point where the road narrowed, a force of about 12,000 to 15,000 Afghan tribesmen was in place along the hills, threatening the column's flank. As Stewart began to reposition his men to respond, the mass of Afghan tribesmen rushed over the hills and attacked. While the British-led force had difficulty in holding their line, the Afghans were eventually driven back and, after an hour of fierce fighting, the tribesmen fled. The Afghans suffered heavy casualties – 2,000 to 3,000 killed – compared with British and Indian loses of 17 dead and 124 wounded.

Following the battle, Stewart continued to advance and occupied Ghazni the next day, before marching on to Kabul without further substantial resistance.

The victory helped strengthen the British position in Afghanistan, with General Roberts ordering a Royal salute fired in Kabul to proclaim the victory, "that it might have a quieting effect on the excitement which prevailed around Kabul."

In August 1880, during their march to Kandahar, British forces passed Ahmed Khel, finding the graves of British soldiers desecrated, with their bones exposed and scattered.

== Order of battle ==
The following British and Indian Army regiments were present, organised in three brigades:

- Royal Horse Artillery (A Battery, B Brigade)
- Royal Artillery
- 19th Bengal Cavalry (Fane's Lancers)
- 1st Punjab Cavalry
- 2nd Punjab Cavalry
- 59th Foot
- 2nd/60th Rifles
- 2nd Sikh Infantry
- 3rd Gurkha Rifles
- 15th Bengal Native Infantry (Ludhiana Sikhs)
- 19th Bengal Native Infantry (Punjabis)
- 25th Bengal Native Infantry (Punjabis)

The Afghan tribesmen, both mounted and on foot, were of the Andarees, Tarkees, Suleiman Khels and other Afghan tribes.
