= British Cemetery, Kabul =

Christian cemetery in Kabul, Afghanistan

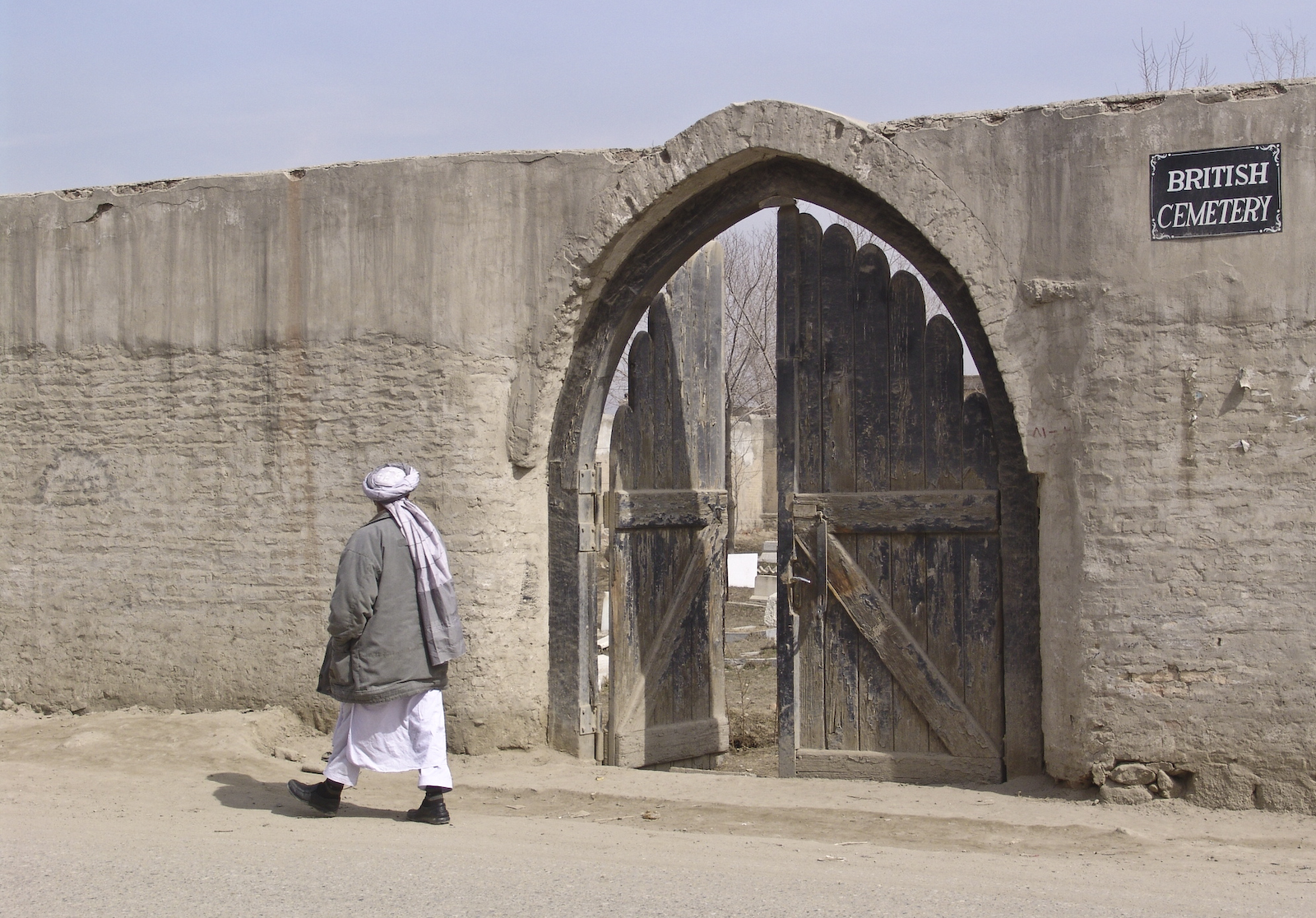
Entrance to the cemetery

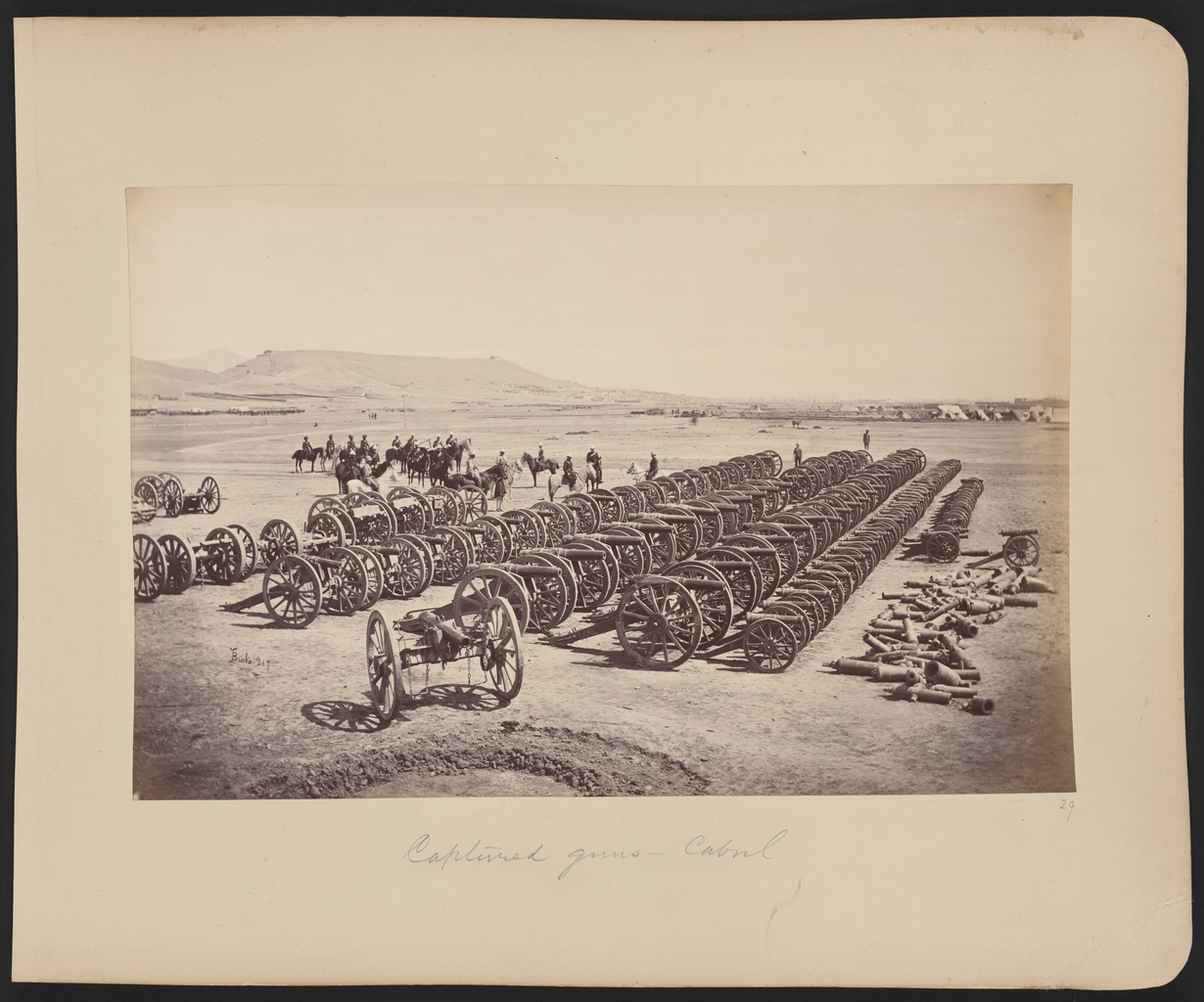
Sir Frederick Roberts, commander of the Kabul Field Force inspecting captured Afghan artillery in the Sherpur Cantonment in 1879, then 1.5 kilometres north of Kabul, during the Second Anglo-Afghan War; photograph by John Burke

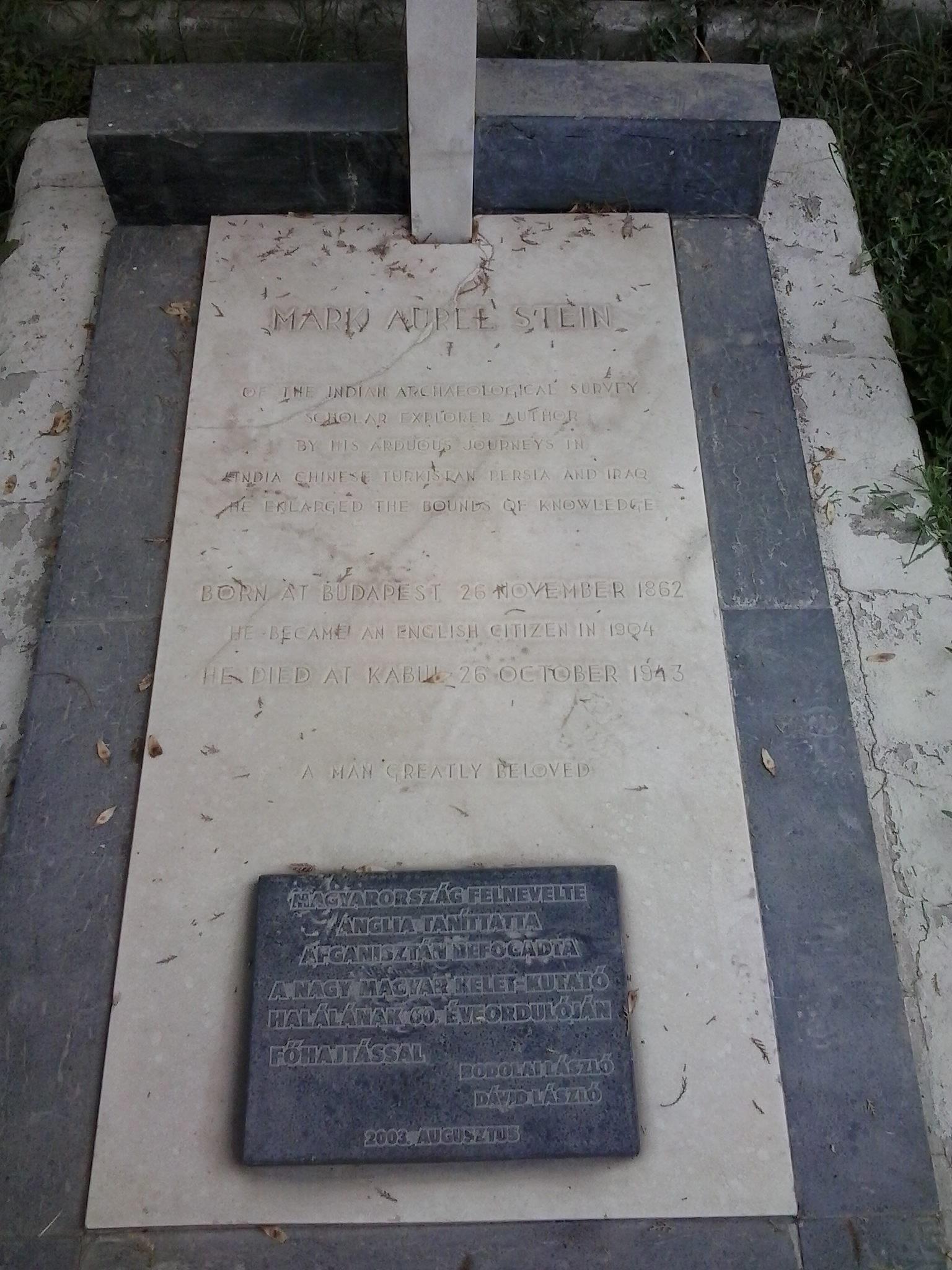
Grave of Aurel Stein

Sherpur Cantonment, or the British Cemetery, is located in Kabul, Afghanistan. The area was a British military camp or cantonment and the site of the 1879 Siege of the Sherpur Cantonment in the Second Anglo-Afghan War. Now officially called the Christian Cemetery, it is known locally as the Kabre Gora, or the 'foreigners' graveyard'.

== Current cemetery and its history ==
The cemetery was built in 1879 for British soldiers killed in the Second Anglo-Afghan War, replacing an earlier graveyard for the First Anglo-Afghan War, with some graves dating back to that 1842 defeat. Some 160 soldiers from that period are thought to be buried here. It also contains the remains of others, mainly civilians of various nationalities, who died in Kabul between the 19th and 21st centuries, and who required a Christian burial. During the 2000s, ten marble plaques were placed on the cemetery's southern wall, listing the names of British service personnel who died in Afghanistan after 2001.

The cemetery is laid out as a garden, with rose bushes and trees and is enclosed by a tall wall, giving it a peaceful atmosphere and an unassuming exterior appearance. It is one of the few foreign historical and Christian landmarks to have survived the first period of Taliban rule that ended in 2001.

== Maintaining the cemetery ==
The caretaker of the cemetery from the 1980s was an Afghan man called Rahimullah, a shepherd who used the cemetery to graze his animals. When he died in 2010, his son Abdul Sami continued to tend the cemetery, telling a reporter that "this place is very nearly not here" and crediting his father's devotion, including during the first period of Taliban rule, for the fact that the cemetery survived.

== Notable burials ==
Notable burials include:

- Major John Cook VC (1843–1879), 5th Gurkha Rifles.
- Aurel Stein (1862–1943), British-Hungarian archaeologist.
- Henning Haslund-Christensen (1896–1948), Danish explorer.
- Gayle Williams (1973–2008), British aid worker.

There is a grave in Russian script to a Russian Cossack who fled to Kabul in the aftermath of the 1917 Bolshevik revolution.

== Fundraising for the graveyard ==
The cemetery is not formally recognised by the Commonwealth War Graves Commission and is still owned by the city of Kabul. However, Colonel Simon Diggins, the British defence attaché who coordinated fundraising for the cemetery in 2009, described it as a "labour of love. ... It's very important to us. It would be great to think that in ten years' time, families might be able to come out here and see it and enjoy the tranquillity."

== Gallery ==
=== Sherpur Cantonment at present ===
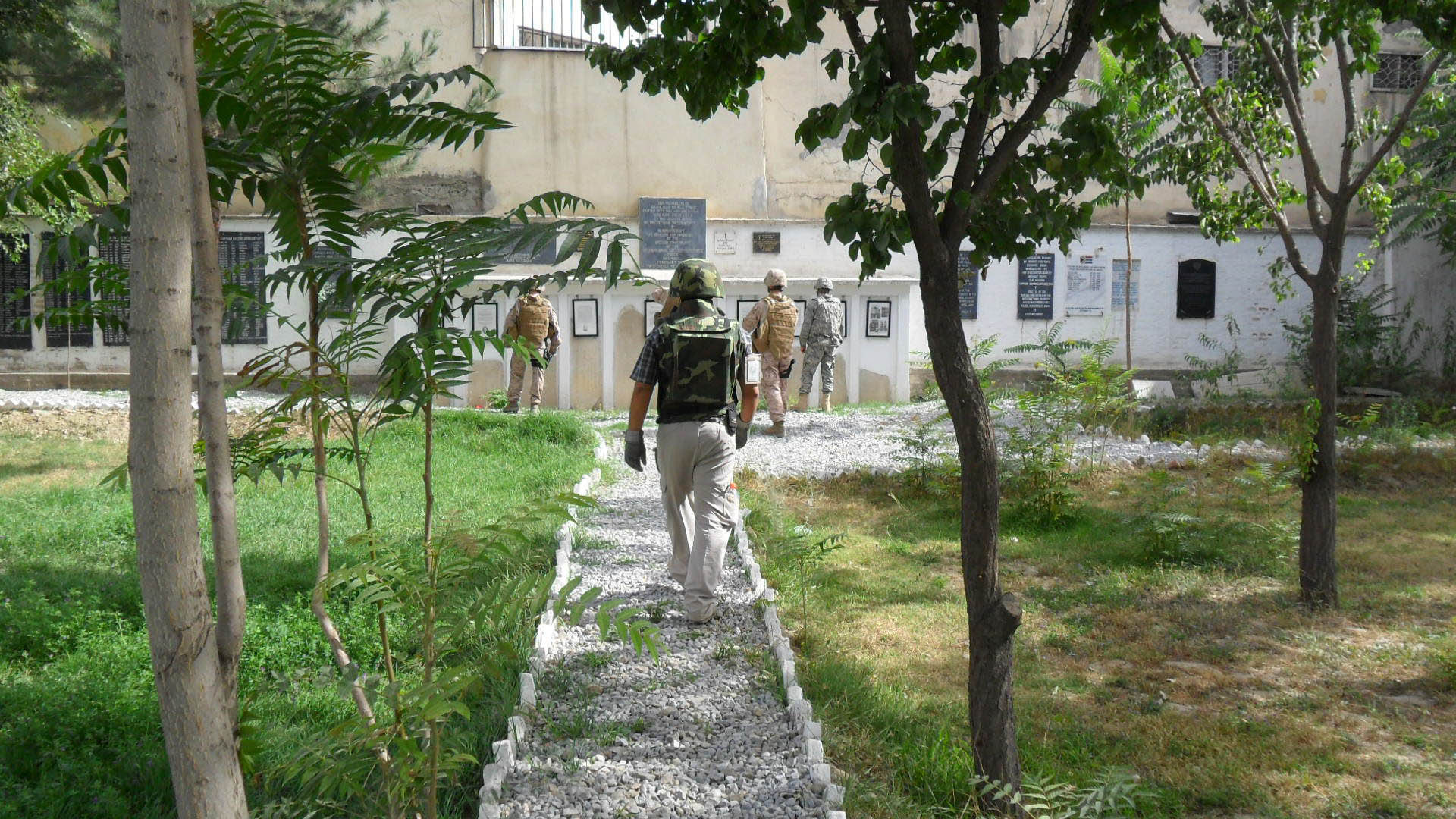
Western troops pay their respects

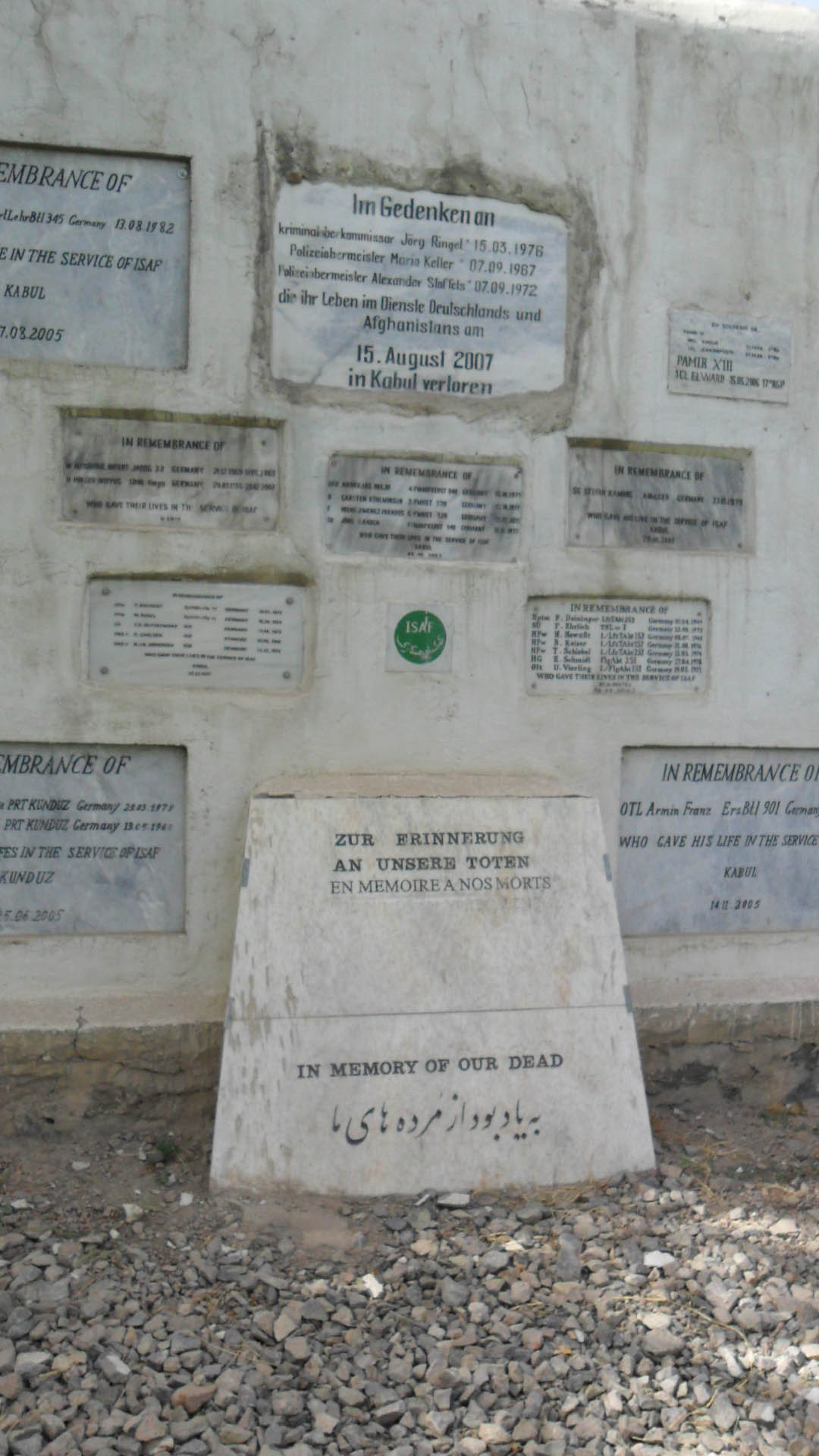
Memorials inside the cantonment

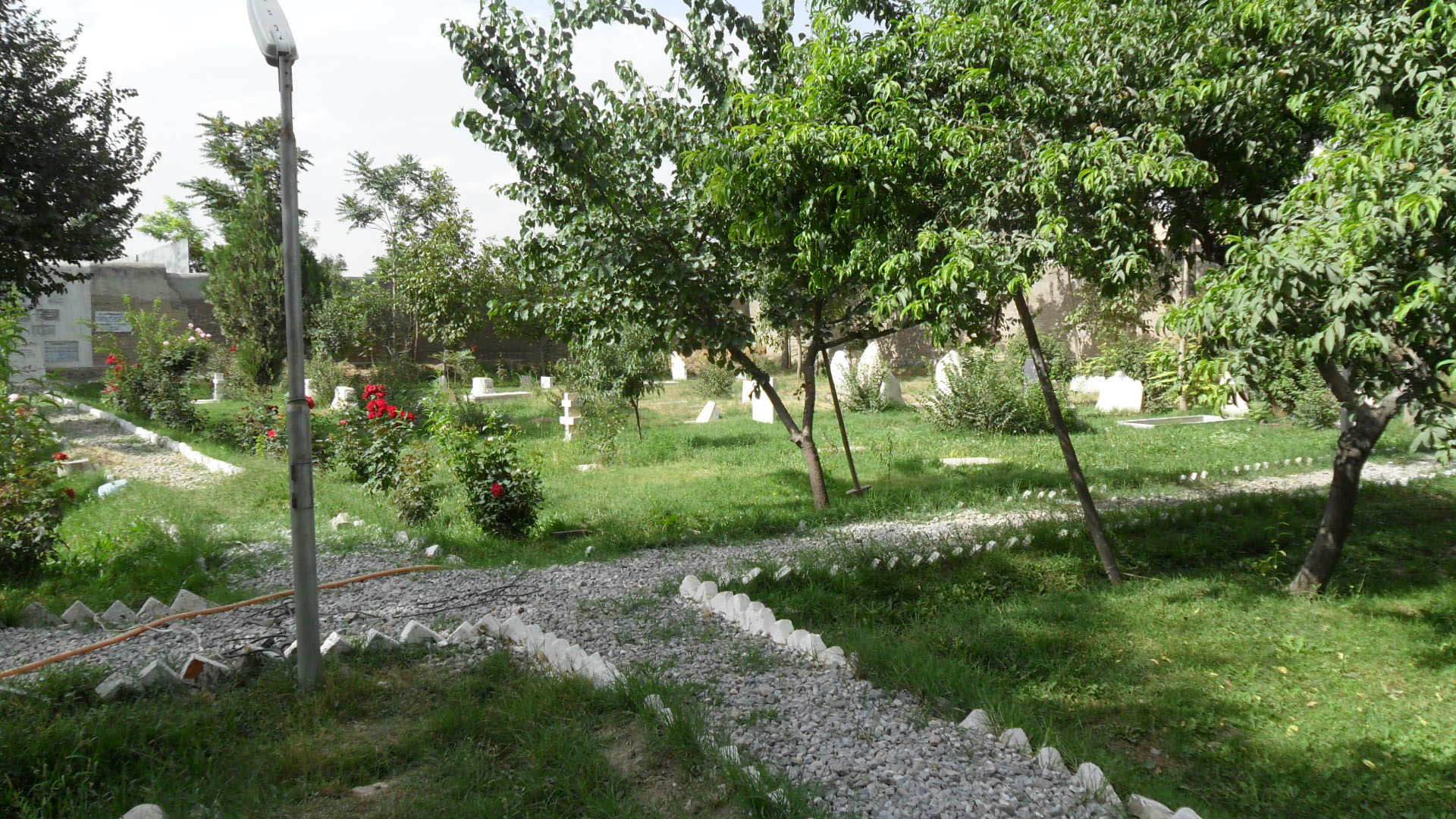
Inside the cantonment

=== Sherpur Cantonment in 1879 ===
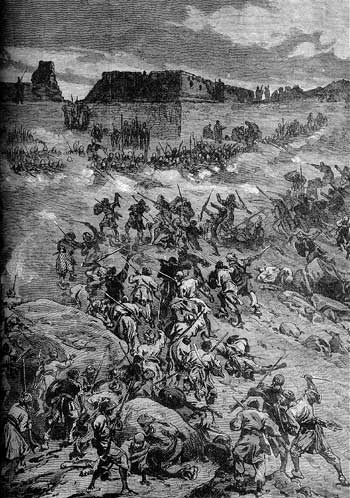
Assault on the Sherpur Cantonment

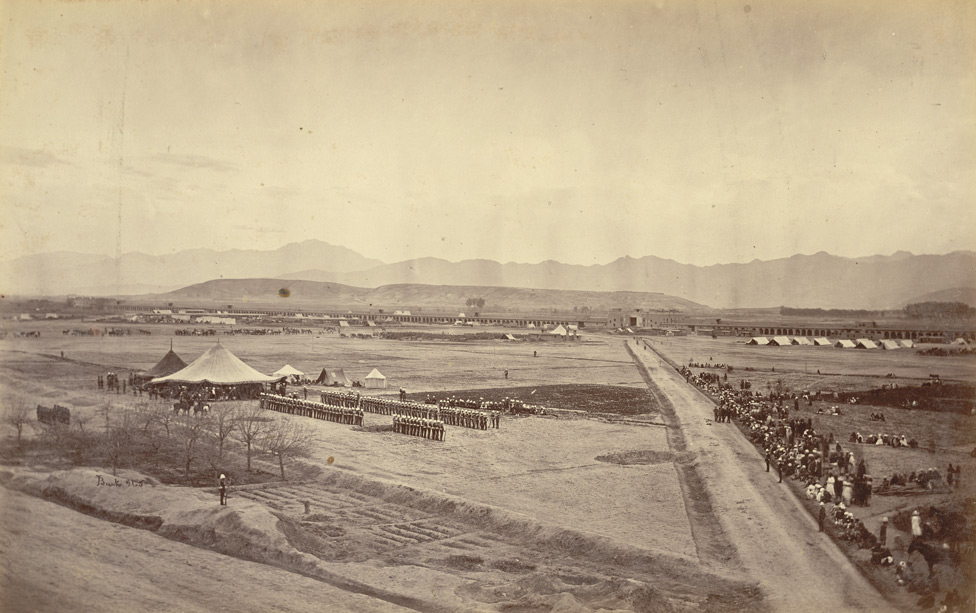
Durbar Maidan in the cantonment

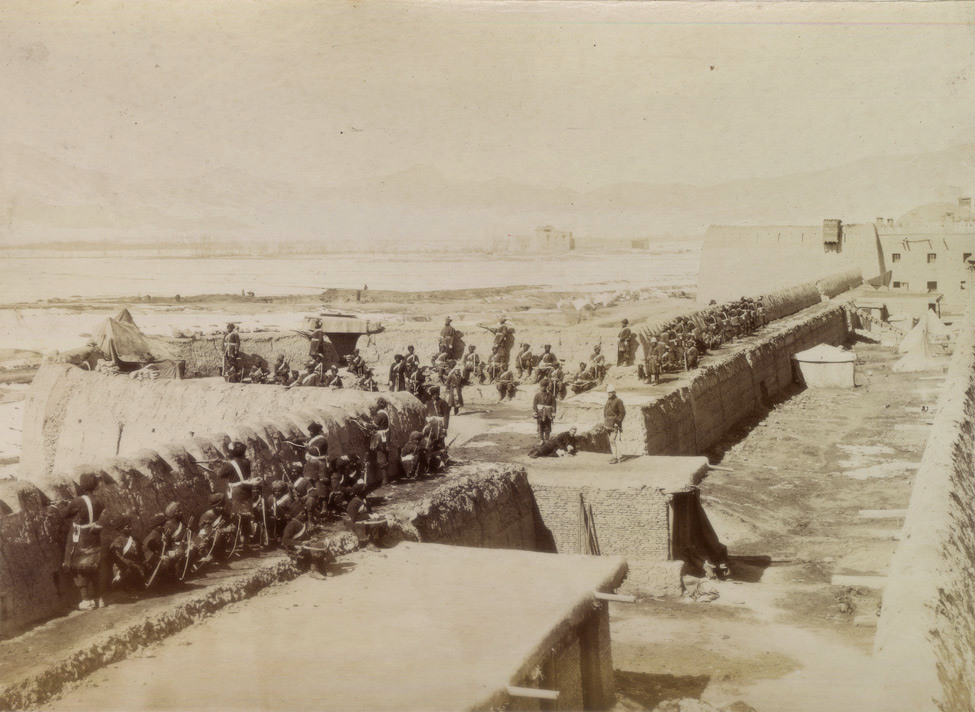
Bengal Sapper and Miners Bastion in the cantonment
