= Kurram Valley Field Force =

British force during the Second Afghan War

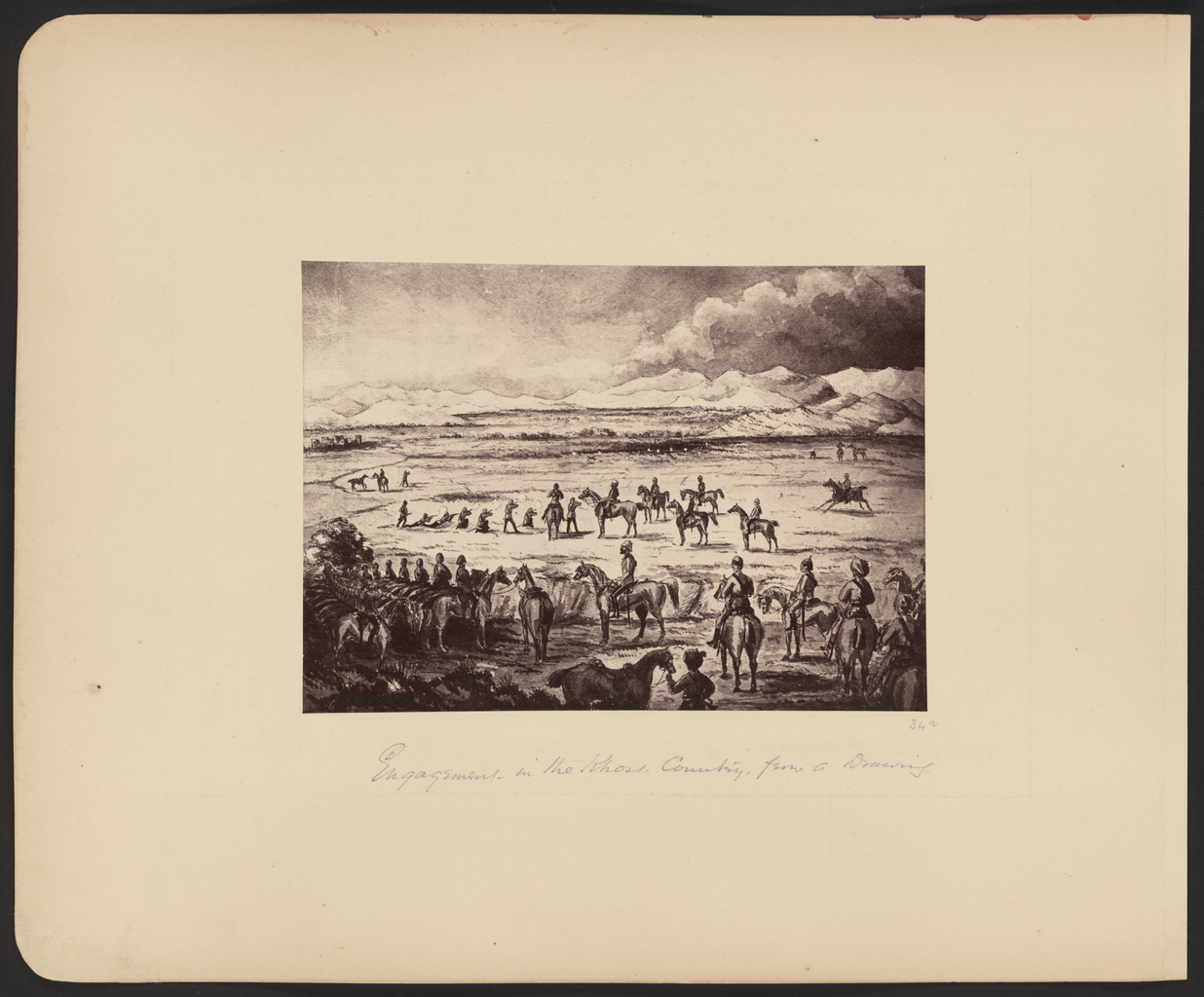
- Kurram Valley Field Force engaging Afghan forces near Khost, Afghanistan in late 1878–January 1879. British cavalry are in the foreground with infantry firing upon the enemy in the distance
- Active: 1878-1879
- Disbanded: 1879
- Country: United Kingdom; British India
- Size: Field force
- Engagements: Second Anglo-Afghan War: Battle of Peiwar Kotal

Commanders
- Notable commanders: Major General Frederick Roberts, VC

The Kurram Valley Field Force was a British military formation during the first phase of the Second Afghan War, 1878–79.

It was one of three military columns created by the British in November 1878 at the start of the Second Afghan War, each of which invaded Afghanistan by a different route. Commanded by Major General Frederick Roberts, the Kurram Valley Field Force was the smallest of the three columns, with an initial strength of 6,665 officers and men of the British and Indian armies and 18 guns. Roberts' force crossed into Afghanistan from India on 21 November 1878 and advanced up the Kurram Valley in the direction of Kabul. After defeating Afghan regular forces, reinforced by local tribesman, at the battle of Peiwar Kotal on 2 December 1878, there followed a number of minor engagements, after which Roberts' force occupied the whole of the Kurram Valley. Here the Kurram Field Force was reinforced by a further 3,500 men, many of whom were placed along the line of communication back to India.

The Afghan government soon sued for peace, and the first phase of the Afghan War ended in May 1879 with the Treaty of Gandamak. However, on 3 September 1879 the British envoy in Kabul and his staff were murdered, and the second phase of the war commenced. The Kurram Valley Field Force was then the only British formation in Afghanistan, and were speedily reinforced from India by new units and renamed the Kabul Field Force. Still commanded by General Roberts, this force was ordered to advance on Kabul with the objective of taking punitive action against the killers of the British envoy. The remaining troops in the Kurram Valley then ceased to be a separate field force and acted as line of communications troops for the Kabul Force, with local command passing from Roberts to Brigadier General T. Gordon on 27 September 1879.

== Composition ==
The following units were attached to the Kurram Valley Field Force when it crossed into Afghanistan on 21 November 1878. The force's then strength totalled 5,335 officers and men with 13 guns.

=== British Army Regiments ===
- F Battery, A Brigade, Royal Horse Artillery, (6 guns)
- G Battery, 3rd Brigade, Royal Artillery, (3 guns)
- One squadron, 10th Hussars
- 2nd battalion, 8th King's Regiment
- 72nd Highlanders (half-battalion)

Total British troops: 1,345 officers and men; 9 guns.

=== Indian Army Regiments ===
- No. 1 Mountain Battery, (4 guns)
- 12th Bengal Cavalry
- 7th Company, Bengal Sappers and Miners
- 2nd Punjab Infantry, Punjab Frontier Force
- 5th Punjab Infantry, Punjab Frontier Force
- 21st Punjab Infantry
- 23rd Bengal Native Infantry (Punjab Pioneers)
- 29th Bengal Native Infantry (Punjabis)
- 5th Gurkha Rifles, Punjab Frontier Force

Total Indian troops: 3,990 officers and men; 4 guns.

At the end of December 1878 the Kurram Field Force was reinforced with a further 2,685 infantry, 868 cavalry and 13 guns. Many of the new troops were used as line of communications troops.

== See also ==
- Battle of Peiwar Kotal
- Kabul Field Force
