= Stewart baronets of South Kensington (1881) =

Extinct baronetcy of the United Kingdom

Escutcheon of the Stewart baronets of South Kensington

The Stewart baronetcy, of South Kensington in the County of London, was created in the Baronetage of the United Kingdom on 11 June 1881 for the soldier Donald Martin Stewart.

The title became extinct on the death of the 3rd Baronet in 1951.

== Stewart baronets, of South Kensington (1881) ==
- Sir Donald Martin Stewart, 1st Baronet (1824–1900)
- Sir Norman Robert Stewart, 2nd Baronet (1851–1926)
- Sir Douglas Law Stewart, 3rd Baronet (1878–1951), left no heir.

== Notes ==
Baronetage of the United Kingdom
New creation	Baronet of the Army; 1881–1914	Extinct
Preceded by Roberts baronets	Stewart baronets of South Kensington; 11 June 1881	Succeeded by Phillimore baronets
