= Frederick Roberts (VC, born 1872) =

Recipient of the Victoria Cross

Lieutenant The Honourable Frederick Roberts VC
- Hon. Frederick Roberts VC
- Born: Frederick Hugh Sherston Roberts; 8 January 1872; Umballa, Punjab, British India (now Ambala, Haryana, India)
- Died: 17 December 1899 (aged 27); South Africa
- Burial place: Chieveley Military Cemetery, Frere
- Relatives: Frederick Roberts, 1st Earl Roberts (father)
- Military career
- Allegiance: United Kingdom
- Branch: British Army
- Service years: 1891–1899
- Rank: Lieutenant
- Units: King's Royal Rifle Corps
- Conflicts: Chitral Expedition; Second Boer War: Battle of Colenso
- Awards: Victoria Cross; Mentioned in Despatches; Order of the Medjidie, 4th class (Ottoman Empire)

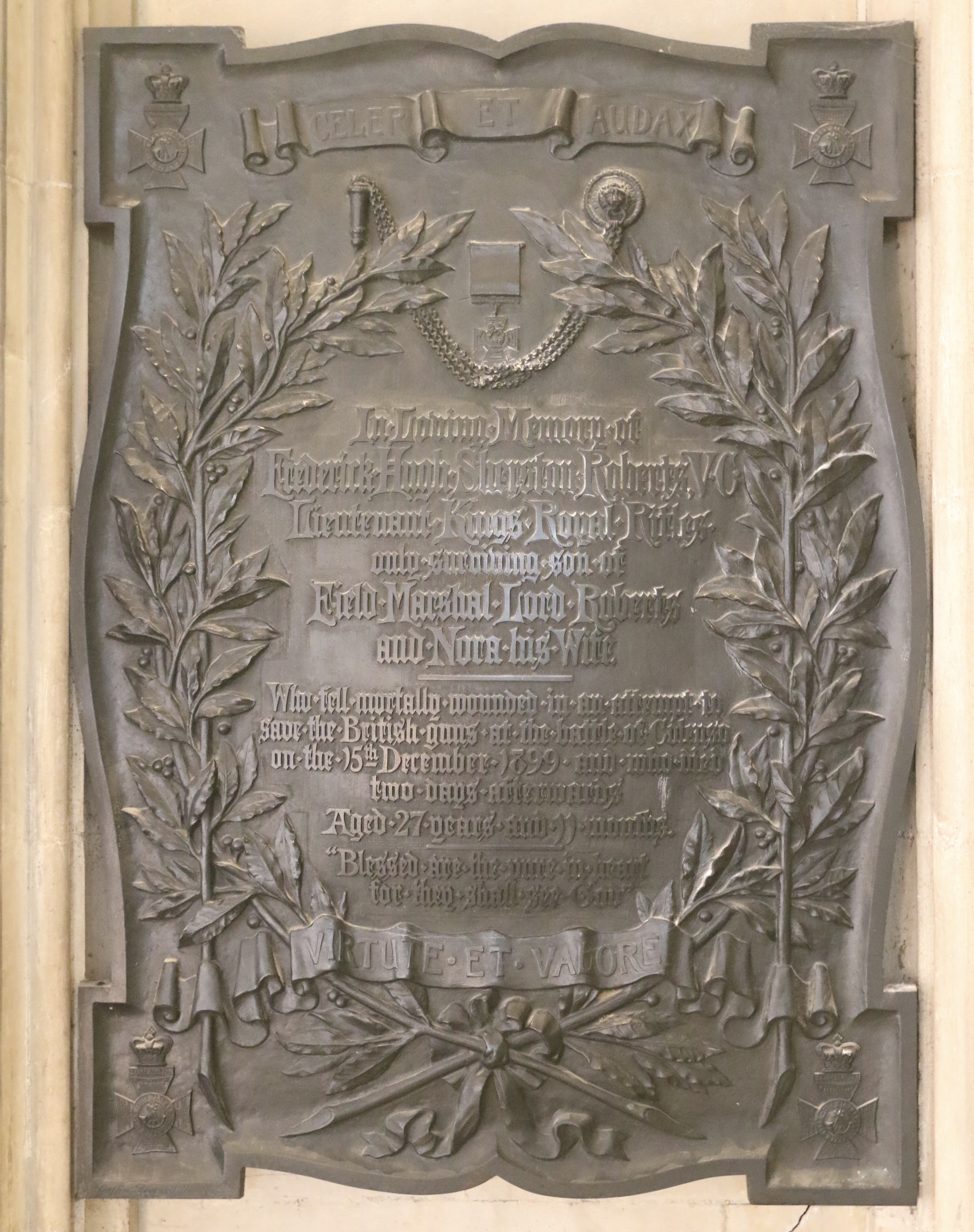
Memorial in Winchester Cathedral

Frederick Hugh Sherston Roberts (8 January 1872 – 17 December 1899) was a British Army officer and recipient of the Victoria Cross, the highest award for gallantry in the face of the enemy that can be awarded to British and Commonwealth forces. Roberts was the son of the famous Victorian commander Field Marshal Frederick Roberts, 1st Earl Roberts.

== Early life ==
Born in Umballa, India, Roberts attended Sandroyd School before heading to Eton College and joined the British Army soon after completing his studies. As the son of Field Marshal Frederick Roberts, 1st Earl Roberts, one of the greatest commanders of the Victorian era, he followed his father into the army and, after the Royal Military College, Sandhurst, he was commissioned as a second lieutenant in the King's Royal Rifle Corps on 10 June 1891. After joining the army he was soon involved in action, fighting in the Waziristan Expedition in 1894 and 1895, where he was mentioned in dispatches. He came to the attention of senior officers for his effective leadership. In 1898 he took part in the Nile Expedition following which he was promoted lieutenant, and awarded Order of Meijidieh, 4th class, from the Ottoman Empire.

== Second Boer War ==
At the age of 27, Roberts went with the King's Rifles to the Second Boer War, when the following deed took place for which he was awarded the Victoria Cross.

On 15 December 1899 at the Battle of Colenso, South Africa, Roberts, with several others, tried to save the guns of the 14th and 66th Batteries, Royal Field Artillery, when the detachments serving the guns had all become casualties or been driven from their guns. Some of the horses and drivers were sheltering in a donga, a dried watercourse, about 500 yards behind the guns and the intervening space was swept with shell and rifle fire. Roberts with two other officers (Walter Congreve and Harry Norton Schofield) and Corporal George Nurse helped to hook a team into a limber and then to limber up a gun. While doing so, he fell badly wounded and two days later died of his wounds at Chieveley, Natal. The action was observed by the Commander-in-Chief, Redvers Buller, who recommended Roberts for the VC in a despatch written on 16 December, before Roberts had died from his wounds.

Confirmation of the award was made on 2 February 1900, the citation reading:

War Office, February 2, 1900.

The Queen has been graciously pleased to signify Her intention to confer the decoration of the Victoria Cross on the undermentioned Officers and Non-Commissioned Officer, whose claims have been submitted for Her Majesty's approval, for their conspicuous bravery at the battle of Colenso, as stated against their names:—

[...]

The Rifle Brigade (The Prince Consort's Own) Captain W. N. Congreve

At Colenso on the 15th December, 1899, the detachments serving the guns of the 14th and 66th Batteries, Royal Field Artillery, had all been either killed, wounded, or driven from their guns by Infantry fire at close range, and the guns were deserted.

About 500 yards behind the guns was a donga in which some of the few horses and drivers left alive were sheltered. The intervening space was swept with shell and rifle fire.

Captain Congreve, Rifle Brigade, who was in the donga, assisted to hook a team into a limber, went out; and assisted to limber up a gun. Being wounded, he took shelter; but, seeing Lieutenant Roberts fall, badly wounded, he went out again and brought him in. Captain Congreve was shot through the leg, through the toe of his boot, grazed on the elbow and the shoulder, and his horse shot in three places.

Lieutenant the Honourable F. H. S. Roberts (since deceased). Lieutenant Roberts assisted Captain Congreve. He was wounded in three places.

Roberts and his father were one of only three father-son pairs to win the VC, his father having won it in 1858 for an action at Khudaganj during the Indian rebellion.

Roberts' Victoria Cross is displayed at the National Army Museum in Chelsea, London.
