= Sir Donald Stewart, 1st Baronet =

British field marshal

Field Marshal Sir Donald Stewart GCB Bt GCSI CIE
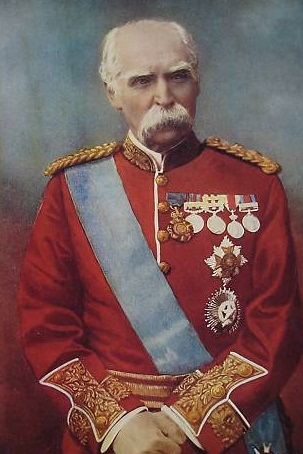
- Born: 1 March 1824; Forres, Moray, Scotland
- Died: 26 March 1900 (aged 76); Algiers, Algeria
- Burial place: Brompton Cemetery, London
- Military career
- Allegiance: United Kingdom
- Branch: British Indian Army
- Service years: 1840–1885
- Rank: Field Marshal
- Commands: Commander-in-Chief, India
- Conflicts: Indian Rebellion; Second Anglo-Afghan War
- Awards: See below

Field Marshal Sir Donald Martin Stewart, 1st Baronet, GCB, GCSI, CIE (1 March 1824 – 26 March 1900) was a senior Indian Army officer. He fought on the Aka Khel Expedition to the North-West Frontier in 1854, took part in the response to the Indian Rebellion in 1857 and, after serving as commandant of the penal settlement of the Andaman Islands, fought in the Second Anglo-Afghan War as Commander of the Quetta Army. In that role, he advanced through the Bolan Pass to Quetta, and then on to Kandahar in January 1879. In March 1880, he made a difficult march from Kandahar to Kabul, fighting on the way the Battle of Ahmed Khel and Battle of Arzu, and then holding supreme military and civil command in northern Afghanistan. He became Commander-in-Chief, India in April 1881 and a member of the Council of the Secretary of State for India in 1893.

== Early life ==
Stewart was born the son of Robert Stewart and Flora Stewart (née Martin) at Mount Pleasant, near Forres, Moray in Scotland. Both parents were from Highland families. His father represented a branch of the Stewarts of Fincastle, descendants of King Robert II of Scotland. His mother was a daughter of Rev. Donald Martin, Minister of Abernethy, in Strathspey, but originally from Skye, and connected to the clans on that island. Young Donald was educated at schools at Findhorn, Dufftown and Elgin and at the University of Aberdeen.

== Career ==
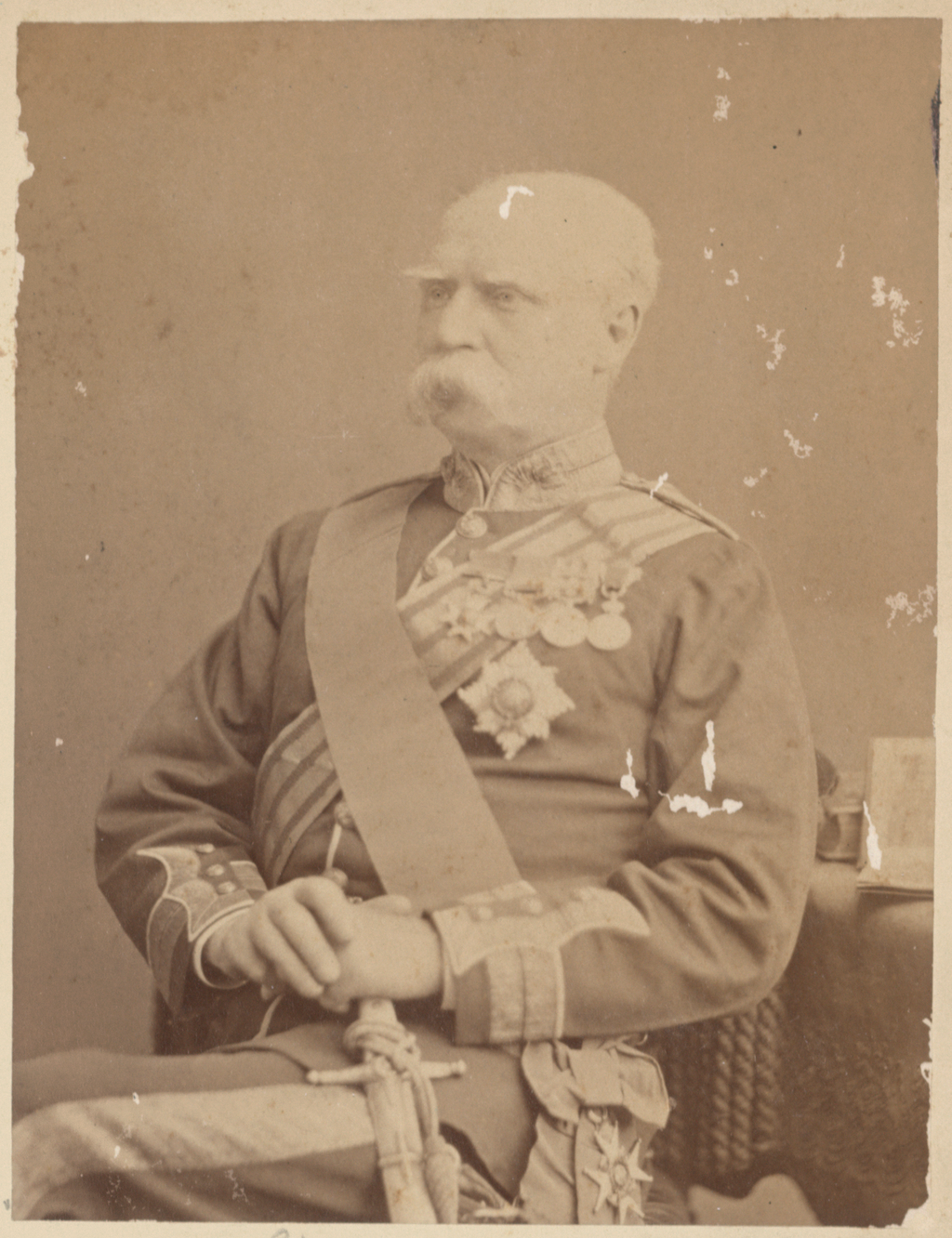
Lieutenant General Donald Stewart during the Second Anglo-Afghan War. In 1878 Stewart commanded the Kandahar Field Force (also known as the Quetta Army). He led the march across harsh terrain and into several cavalry battles against Afghan forces on his way to occupying Kandahar in January 1879. He was promoted to commander in chief in India in April 1881 and to field marshal in 1894. He is shown here in the uniform of a lieutenant general.

Stewart was commissioned as an ensign in the 9th Bengal Native Infantry on 12 October 1840 and was promoted to lieutenant on 3 January 1844 and to captain on 1 June 1854. Later that year he served on the Aka Khel Expedition to the North-West Frontier.

During the Indian Rebellion, after a famous ride from Agra to Delhi with dispatches, Stewart served as the deputy assistant adjutant-general at the Siege of Delhi in Summer 1857 and then as assistant adjutant-general at the Siege of Lucknow in Autumn 1857. After serving through the campaign in Rohilkhand he was promoted to major on 19 January 1858 and to lieutenant-colonel on 20 July 1858. He became deputy-adjutant-general of the Bengal Army in 1862 and, having been promoted to colonel on 20 July 1863, he commanded the Bengal brigade in the Abyssinian expedition in 1867. Promoted to major-general on 24 December 1868, he became commandant of the penal settlement of the Andaman Islands, and was present when one of the inmates assassinated Lord Mayo, British Viceroy of India, in 1872. After being exonerated in the subsequent inquiry, he was appointed Commander of the troops at Lahore in 1876.

Promoted to lieutenant-general on 1 October 1877, Stewart commanded a column during the Second Anglo-Afghan War advancing through the Bolan Pass to Quetta, and then on to Kandahar in January 1879. In March 1880, he made a difficult march from Kandahar to Kabul, fighting on the way the Battle of Ahmed Khel and Battle of Arzu, and then holding supreme military and civil command in northern Afghanistan. On hearing of the Maiwand disaster, he despatched Sir Frederick Roberts with a division on his celebrated march from Kabul to Kandahar, while he led the rest of the army back to India through the Khyber Pass. For this he was given the thanks of parliament and created a baronet.

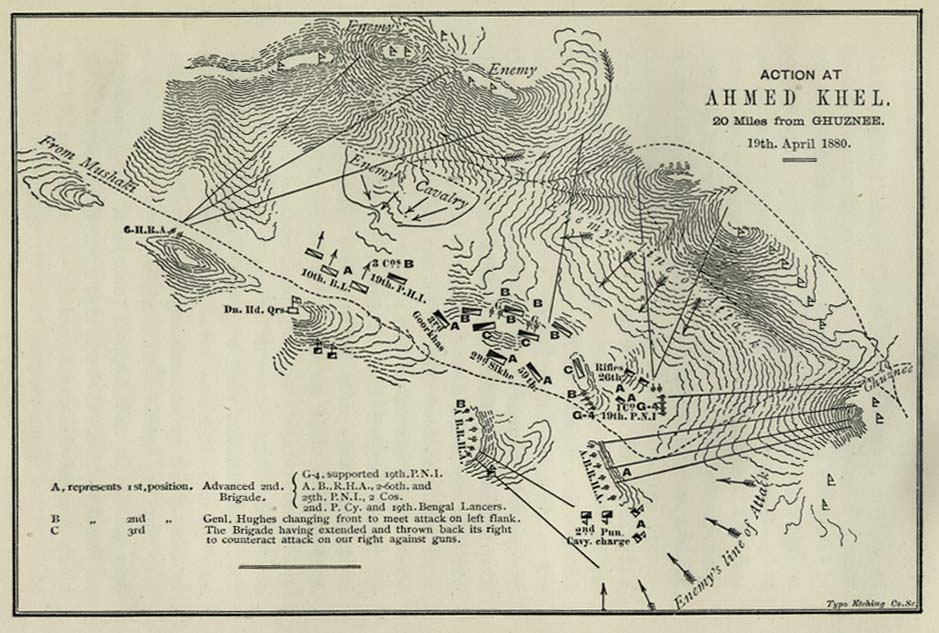
The Battle of Ahmed Khel, at which Stewart led the British forces, during the Second Anglo-Afghan War

Stewart became Military member of the Council of the Governor-General of India (effectively War Minister) in October 1880 and, having been promoted to full general on 1 July 1881, he became Commander-in-Chief, India in April 1881. In order to achieve efficiency savings he proposed merging the Bengal Army, Madras Army and Bombay Army into a single military force but this was rejected by the India Office. During the Panjdeh Incident in March 1885 he secured a significant increase in the number of British troops in India. He returned to London to become a member of the Council of the Secretary of State for India in 1893 and, in that role, again argued - this time successfully - for the creation of a single Indian Army. He was promoted to field marshal on 26 May 1894 and became a member of the Royal Commission on Indian civil and military expenditure as well as Governor of the Royal Hospital Chelsea from 1895 until his death at Algiers on 26 March 1900. His remains were brought home by the cruiser HMS Juno, and buried in Brompton Cemetery in London.

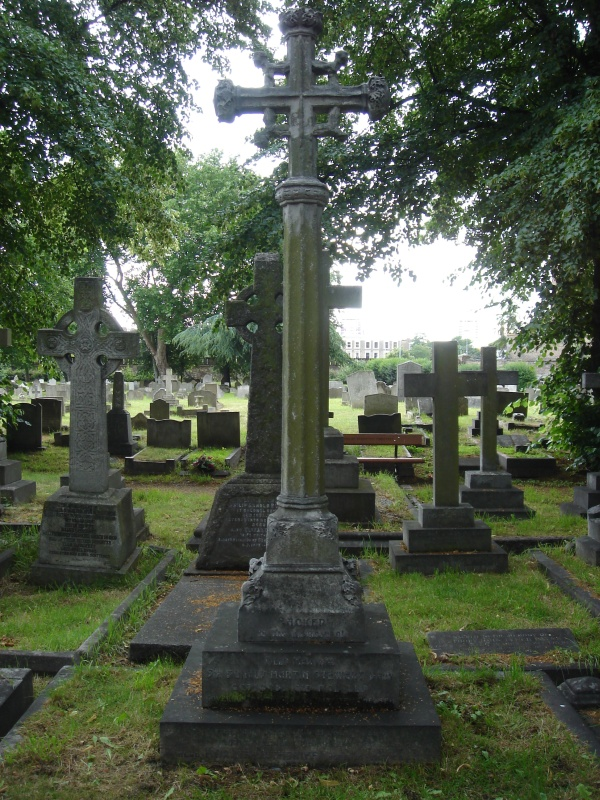
Funerary monument, Brompton Cemetery, London

== Family ==
In 1847 Stewart married Davina Marine Dabine, daughter of Commander Thomas Dymock Dabine, RN. Lady Stewart was invested as a Companion of the Imperial Order of the Crown of India (CI) by Queen Victoria at Windsor Castle on 6 March 1900. They had two sons and three daughters:

- Major-General Sir Norman Robert Stewart, 2nd Baronet, CB (1851–1926), Indian Army; married 1875 Adeline Hewett, of Bombay; and left issue a son and two daughters.
- Flora Alice Stewart (b.1853); married 1st 1877 Brigadier-Surgeon Richard William Davies (d. 1890); married 2nd 1893 Major Sir Walter Kentish William Jenner, 2nd Baronet (1860–1948); left children.
- Marina Annie Stewart (b.1855); married 1882 Major-General Sir Francis John William Eustace, KCB.
- Sir Donald William Stewart, KCMG, (1860–1905), a military officer and Commissioner of the East Africa Protectorate.
- Norah Helen Gertrude Stewart (b.1868); married 1st 1891 (div. 1894) S. J. O′Neill Murphy; 2nd 1899 Captain Leopold Christian Duncan Jenner; and had issue by first marriage.

== Honours and awards ==
Stewart's honours included:

- Knight Grand Cross of the Order of the Bath (GCB) - 21 September 1880 (KCB - 25 July 1879; CB - 14 August 1868)
- Knight Grand Commander of the Order of the Star of India (GCSI) - 7 December 1885
- Companion of the Order of the Indian Empire (CIE) - 24 May 1881

=== Memorial ===
There is a memorial to him in St Paul's Cathedral.

== Sources ==
- Elsmie, George Robert (1903). Field-Marshal Sir Donald Stewart: G.C.B., G.C.S.L., C.I.E.; an account of his life, mainly in his own words. London, John Murray.
- Heathcote, Tony (1999). The British Field Marshals 1736–1997. Leo Cooper. ISBN 0-85052-696-5.
- Vetch, Robert Hamilton (1901). "Stewart, Donald Martin" . In Lee, Sidney (ed.). Dictionary of National Biography (1st supplement). London: Smith, Elder & Co.

Attribution

Government offices
Preceded by F. L. Playfair as Superintendent of Port Blair	Chief Commissioner of the Andaman and Nicobar Islands; 1872–1875	Succeeded by Charles Arthur Barwell
Military offices
Preceded by Sir Frederick Haines	Commander-in-Chief, India; 1881–1885	Succeeded by The Earl Roberts
Honorary titles
Preceded by Sir Patrick Grant	Governor, Royal Hospital Chelsea; 1895–1900	Succeeded by Sir Henry Norman
Baronetage of the United Kingdom
New creation	Baronet (of South Kensington); 1881–1900	Succeeded by Norman Robert Stewart
