= Royal York Crescent =

Street in Bristol, England

Coordinates: 51.45403°N 2.62071°W

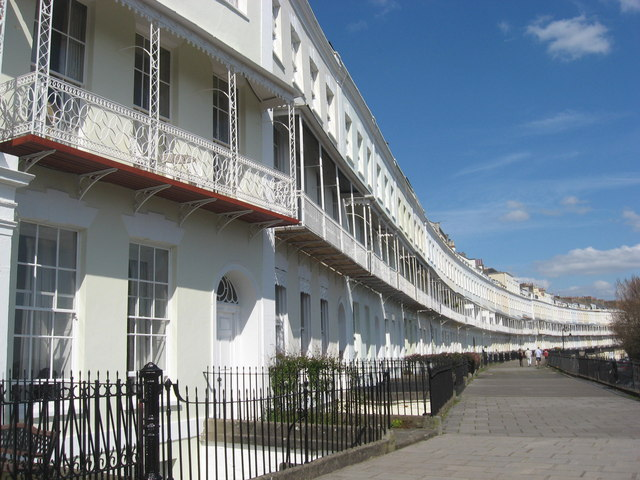
Royal York Crescent from the west end. Eugénie de Montijo attended school in the house on the left.

Royal York Crescent is a residential street in Clifton, Bristol. It overlooks the Royal York Crescent Gardens, lower Clifton, and Hotwells as well as the Bristol Harbour, and much of the city can be seen from it. It also joins Clifton Village at one end. It is one of the most expensive streets in the city.

Nos. 1–46 form a crescent which is a Grade II* listed building. Their construction started in 1791 but was not completed until 1820. Nos. 47–50, attached to the eastern end of the main crescent, are Grade II listed. The raised pavement built over vaulted cellars in front of the entire terrace, which is c. 390 metres (1,280 ft) long, is separately listed as Grade II*. Royal York Crescent is reputed to be the longest crescent in Europe.

Nos. 1–3 were used until 1855 as a boarding school for girls, run by Mrs Rogers and her four daughters. In 1837 the school was attended by Eugénie de Montijo, the future Empress of the French, and her sister Paca, the future Duchess of Alba.

The crescent is part of the Clifton conservation area.
