= Aileen Roberts, 2nd Countess Roberts =

British peeress

The Right Honourable The Countess Roberts DBE
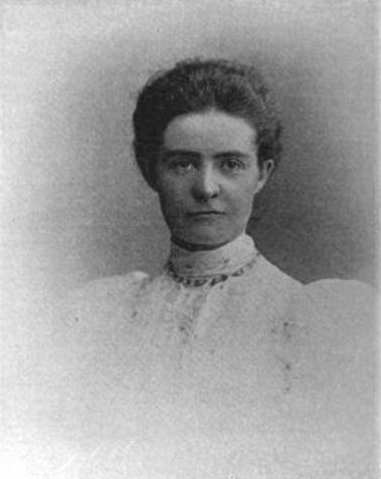
- Born: Aileen Mary Roberts; 20 September 1870
- Died: 9 October 1944 (aged 74); Ascot, England
- Father: The 1st Earl Roberts

Aileen Mary Roberts, 2nd Countess Roberts DBE (20 September 1870 – 9 October 1944), was a British peeress.

She was one of the six children of Field Marshal Frederick Roberts, 1st Earl Roberts, and Nora Henrietta (née Bews). She succeeded to the titles of Countess Roberts and Viscountess St. Pierre on 14 November 1914.

As Earl Roberts' sons had predeceased him, the earldom was allowed to pass down the female line. Aileen became the 2nd Countess Roberts in 1914. She was invested as a Dame Commander of the Order of the British Empire (DBE) in 1918 for her services as Honorary Secretary, Officers' Families Fund and founder of the Countess Roberts Field Glass Fund.

Countess Roberts died in Ascot in 1944, unmarried, at the age of 74. She was succeeded as 3rd Countess Roberts by her younger sister, Ada Edwina Stewart Roberts (28 March 1875 – 21 February 1955), who married Major Henry Lewin (1872–1946). The 3rd Countess, like her father before her, would live to see the death of her own son, and only child, Lieutenant Frederick Roberts Alexander Lewin (18 January 1915 – May 1940), who was killed in action during the Second World War.

Peerage of the United Kingdom
Preceded by Frederick Roberts	Countess Roberts; 1914–1944	Succeeded by Edwina Lewin
