= Khudaganj =

- Town
- Khudaganj Tehsil Tilhar
- Location in Uttar Pradesh, India
- Coordinates: 27.18°N 79.68°E
- Country: India
- State: Uttar Pradesh
- District: Shahjahanpur
- Tehsil: Tilhar
- Subdistrict: Tilhar
- Elevation: 144 m (472 ft)

Population (2001)
  - Total: 11,844

Languages
  - Official: Hindi
- Time zone: UTC+5:30 (IST)
- Postal code: 242305
- Vehicle registration: UP27

Khudaganj is a town and a nagar panchayat in Tehsil Tilhar Shahjahanpur district in the Indian state of Uttar Pradesh.

== Geography ==
Khudaganj is located at 27.18°N 79.68°E. It has an average elevation of 144 metres (472 feet).

== Demographics ==
As of 2001 India census, Khudaganj had a population of 11,844. Males constitute 53% of the population and females 47%. Khudaganj has an average literacy rate of 47%, lower than the national average of 59.5%: male literacy is 55%, and female literacy is 38%. In Khudaganj, 18% of the population is under 6 years of age.
