= National Party (Afghanistan) =

- Founders: Din Mohammad Andar (Ghazni); Mohammad Jan Khan (Maidan Wardak); Mir Bacha Khan (Kohistan); Ghulam Haidar Khan Charkhi (Logar); Mohammad Usman Khan (Tagab)
- Leader: Mohammad Musa Khan
- Founded: Second Anglo-Afghan War
- Dates active: 1879–1881
- Dissolved: 1881
- Country: Emirate of Afghanistan
- Allegiance: Mohammad Yaqub Khan

The National Party, sometimes known as the Ghazni Party according to British reports, was a significant political party and a loyalist militant organization in Afghanistan that rose throughout the Second Anglo-Afghan War in opposition to the British invasion of Afghanistan, and to restore the former deposed Emir Mohammad Yaqub Khan. Although Mohammad Musa Khan was proclaimed emir following the former's deposition, real authority was exercised de facto by leading commanders of this party. Musa Khan, being only 11 years of age, did not actively participate in governance, as his leadership decisions were effectively made by his following advisors.

== Background ==
Following the outbreak of the Second Anglo-Afghan War on 21 November 1879 and the natural death of former Emir Sher Ali Khan, the latter's son Mohammad Yaqub Khan was proclaimed as Emir in Kabul, and decided to initiate a peace treaty with the British to put an end to the war. However, this was later reversed following the anger of Afghan rebels who had felt that such an action brought humiliation to the country's name, and would not accept a feudatory of the British Crown.

Mohammad Yaqub's rebels later stormed the British residency in Kabul, killing 75 British-Indian soldiers in action. This later angered the British, leading them to depose Mohammad Yaqub Khan, and later ultimately led to a British occupation of Kabul.

== Foundation ==
The National Party was then created after the deposition of Mohammad Yaqub Khan, represented by several leaders of equal status that involved rebels from different parts of Afghanistan that initiated a national uprising altogether, featuring Mohammad Musa Khan, the former's son and successor, and de jure Emir of Afghanistan, with the guidance and supervision of Din Mohammad Andar.

== Decline ==
Following Abdur Rahman Khan's accession to the Afghan throne and complete British withdrawal from Afghanistan by April 1881, the National Party dissolved.
