= Siege of the Sherpur Cantonment =

1879 battle of the Second Anglo-Afghan War

- Part of Second Anglo-Afghan War
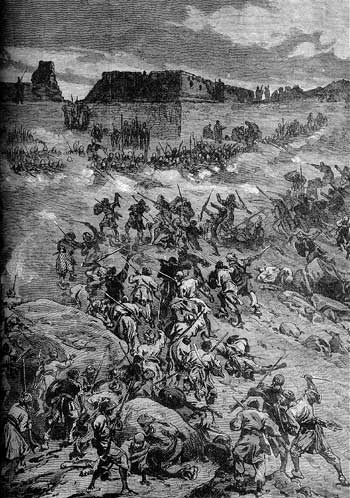
- Assault on the Sherpur Cantonment
Date	15–23 December 1879
Location	Kabul, Afghanistan 34°31′58″N 69°09′57″E
Result	British victory

Belligerents
British Empire: British Raj	Afghanistan

Commanders and leaders
(United Kingdom) Frederick Roberts	Mir Bacha Khan; Mohammad Jan Khan

Strength
7,000 Anglo-Indian troops	50,000 tribal warriors

Casualties and losses
33 dead and wounded	3,000 killed

The siege of the Sherpur Cantonment was a battle fought in December 1879, during the Second Anglo-Afghan War. British forces were besieged by Afghan troops, then repulsed an assault.

== Background ==
On 3 September 1879 Sir Pierre Cavagnari, the British Resident in Kabul, and his escort were massacred by mutinous Afghan troops, initiating the second phase of the Second Anglo-Afghan War. A force was assembled and named the Kabul Field Force, under the command of Major-General Frederick Roberts. After defeating Afghan forces at Chariasab on 6 October, Roberts marched into Kabul on 13 October. With Kabul itself vulnerable to attack, Roberts based his force in the unfinished Sherpur Cantonment, a mile north of the city. A military commission was then set up to try those responsible for Cavagnari's death. While a strong response to the murders was considered necessary, the resultant public executions helped unite Afghan opposition against the British presence.

At the end of November, an army of tribesmen under the command of Mohammed Jan Khan Wardak, who had denounced Amir Mohammad Yaqub Khan as a British puppet and instead declared Musa Jan the new amir, gathered in the area north of Kabul. On 11 December a small detachment (c.170 men) of the 9th Queen's Royal Lancers and the 14th Bengal Lancers encountered a 10,000+ Afghan army advancing on Kabul. In an attempt to delay the advance, the outnumbered Lancers charged the Afghans. Heavy casualties were suffered and the Afghans continued their advance. Anglican chaplain James Adams was awarded the Victoria Cross for rescuing wounded men. Naik Kishanbir Nagarkoti of the 5th Gurkha Rifles was awarded his third Indian Order of Merit at this battle.

== The siege ==
On 15 December, the Afghan army began to besiege the British forces entrenched in the cantonment. As news of a relief column under the command of Brigadier General Charles Gough reached Mohammed Jan, he ordered his troops to storm the cantonment on 23 December. By midday, the assault had been repulsed, and the Afghan army dispersed. No quarter was given to Afghans found in the area with weapons.

The Sherpur Cantonment is maintained as a British military cemetery.

== Order of battle ==
=== British regiments ===
- 9th Lancers
- 67th Foot
- 72nd Highlanders
- 92nd Highlanders

=== British Indian Army regiments ===
- 12th Cavalry
- 14th Murray’s Lancers
- Queen’s Own Corps of Guides
- 5th Cavalry, Punjab Frontier Force
- 1st PWO Sappers and Miners
- 23rd Bengal Native Infantry (Pioneers)
- 28th Bengal Native Infantry (Punjabis)
- 3rd Sikh Infantry
- 5th Punjabis (Vaughan’s Rifles)
- 2nd Gurkha Rifles
- 4th Gurkha Rifles
- 5th Gurkha Rifles
- 22nd (Derajat) Mountain Battery (Frontier Force)
- 24th (Hazara) Mountain Battery (Frontier Force)

== Gallery ==
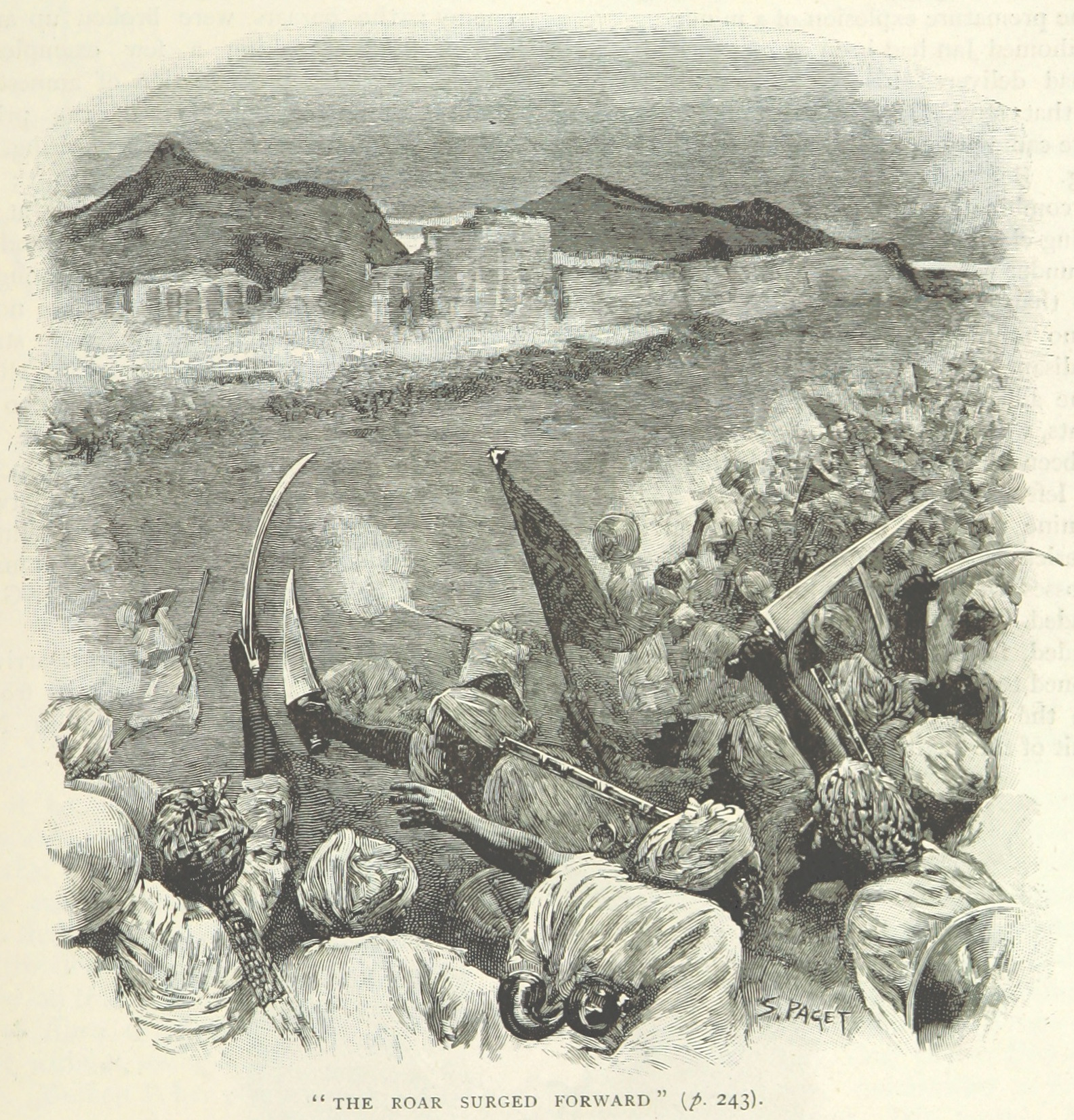
The Afghan forces charge (illustration by Sidney Paget)

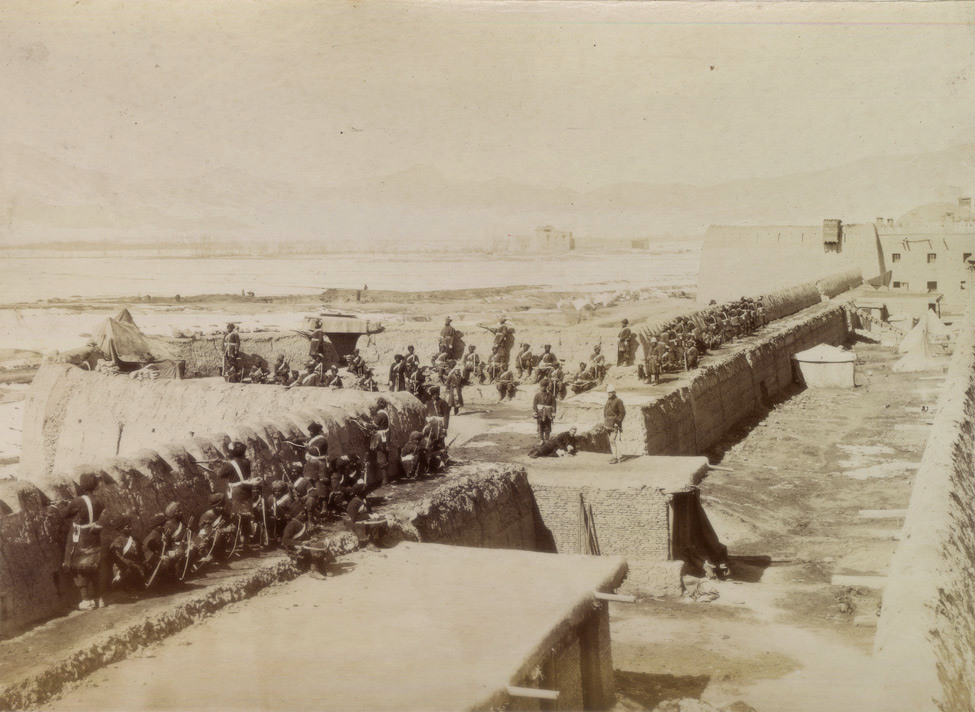
Bengal Sapper and Miners Bastion, in Sherpur Cantonment circa 1879

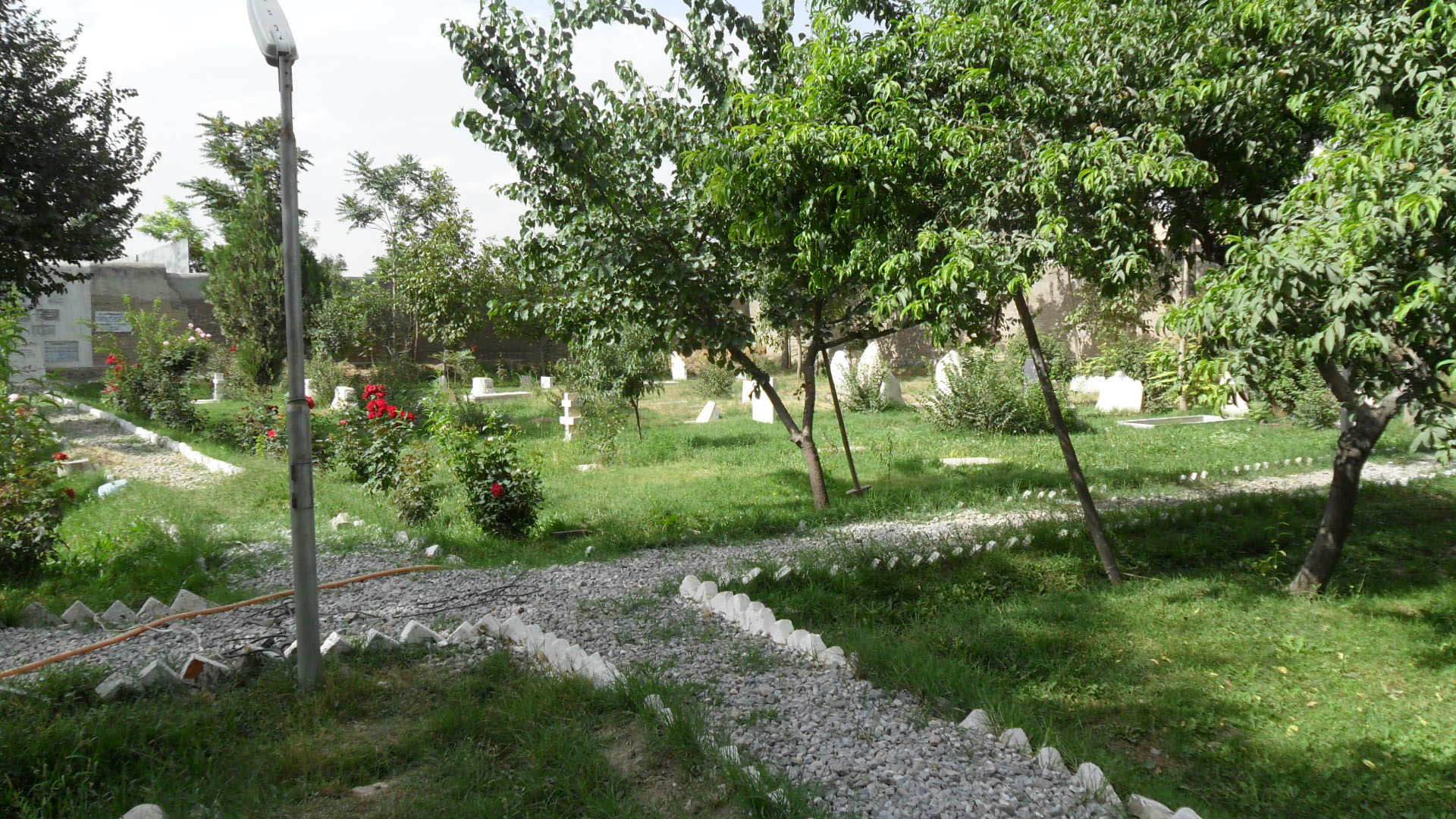
View inside the Sherpur Cantonment in 2010
