= Ghulam Haidar Khan Charkhi =

Sipahsalar Ghulam Haidar Khan
- غلام حيدر خان
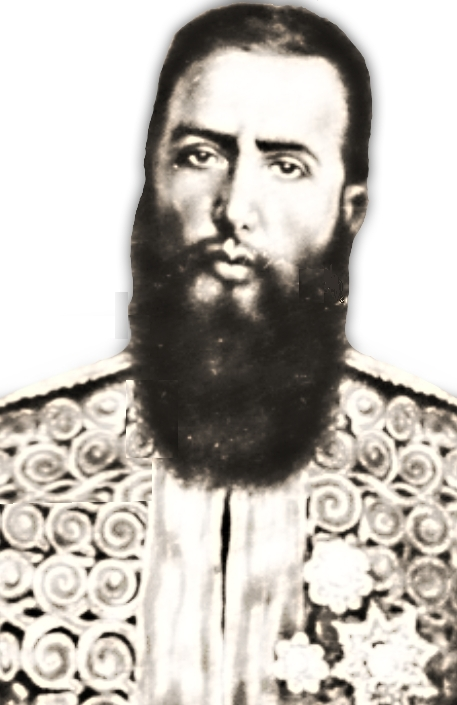
- Portrait of Ghulam Haidar Khan
- Born: Charkh, Emirate of Afghanistan
- Died: 1897; Kabul, Emirate of Afghanistan

Ghulam Haidar Khan Charkhi (Note: Pashto: غلام حيدر خان څرخي, romanized: Ğulām Haidar Xān Śarxi [ɣu.lɑm (h)äɪ.d̪äɾ xɑn t͡säɾ.xi]; Persian: غلام حیدر خان چرخی, romanized: Ghulām Haydar Khān Charkhī [ɣʊ.lɑ́ːm (h)äj.d̪áɾ xɑːn t͡ʃäɾ.xíː]) was the commander-in-chief for Amir Abdur Rahman Khan, formerly the commander of the border forces at Ali Masjid under Amir Mohammad Yaqub Khan and commander of the central forces during the reign of Amir Sher Ali Khan until the latter's death on 21 February 1879.

== Early life ==
Charkhi was born to Samad (or Asmatullah) Khan Charkhi, in Charkh, into a Pashtun family.

== Rise to power ==
Under Amir Sher Ali Khan, Charkhi was commander of the central forces, and led the Afghan Army against the invading British forces at the Battle of Ali Masjid during the Second Anglo-Afghan War, and later joined the National Party alongside many senior leaders against the Afzalids. Mohammad Yaqub Khan stripped him of his rank in 1879, but he kept opposing the British throughout the war. He was one of the leaders of the siege of Sherpur, and one of only four men left out of the amnesty that General Roberts proclaimed in December 1879.

However, following the defeat of the Afghan Army and the deposition of Mohammad Yaqub Khan and his son Mohammad Musa Khan, he later served under Abdur Rahman Khan, and was reportedly the only loyalist who avoided punishment. Before joining Amir Abdur Rahman in July 1880, he had already done him a valuable service by gathering former soldiers and sending them to Turkestan.

== Under Amir Abdur Rahman Khan ==
In 1881 he became Governor of Ghazni. When the Amir sent troops to Kandahar, he was made Deputy Commander-in-Chief, and soon after Commander-in-Chief. He was a great favourite of the Amir, who often praised his loyalty. On appointing him Commander-in-Chief in 1882, the Amir called him “a man of business” who “does his work well.”

From then on he was almost always on campaign, either directing from Jalalabad or leading in the field. In 1882, Charkhi suppressed the rebellion of Sayyid Mahmud Kunari, the son-in-law of Mohammad Akbar Khan in Kunar, forcing him to flee. He served in various capacities in Kandahar, Ghazni, Nuristan, and Jalalabad to consolidate Abdur Rahman Khan's rule.

After he failed against the Mangals in 1883, the Amir rebuked him publicly in Darbar and sent Ghulam Haidar Orakzai in his place. He did better against Kulman and Kashmun in 1886. That same year, while serving in Kunar, he fell out with a general from Herat and left his troops to take his complaint to the Amir in person. A diary from February 1888 reported that the Amir was very pleased with him and had given him the title of Wazir.

After the Afghan Boundary Commission returned in 1886, Sir West Ridgeway wrote of Abdur Rahman’s court: “Excepting perhaps the Commander-in-Chief, General Ghulam Haidar, Charkhi, the Amir has no man of marked ability or influence in his service.”

As governor of Turkistan, Charkhi played a major role in defeating Mohammad Ishaq Khan during the revolt of 1892, and won the rank of commander-in-chief after defeating him. Charkhi would continue to lead the Afghan Army against the Hazara rebels during the Shinwari, Ghilji, and Hazara uprisings. The emir was pleased with his military prowess, and used his strength to be a military commander during the Conquest of Kafiristan, assigned a task to command the second force to march into Kafiristan from Asmar and Chitral.

According to historical records, Ghulam Haidar Khan Charkhi was first poisoned and then died in 1897 as a result of a British conspiracy.
