= Second Anglo-Afghan War =

1878–1880 war between the British Empire and the Emirate of Afghanistan

Second Anglo–Afghan War
- Part of the Great Game
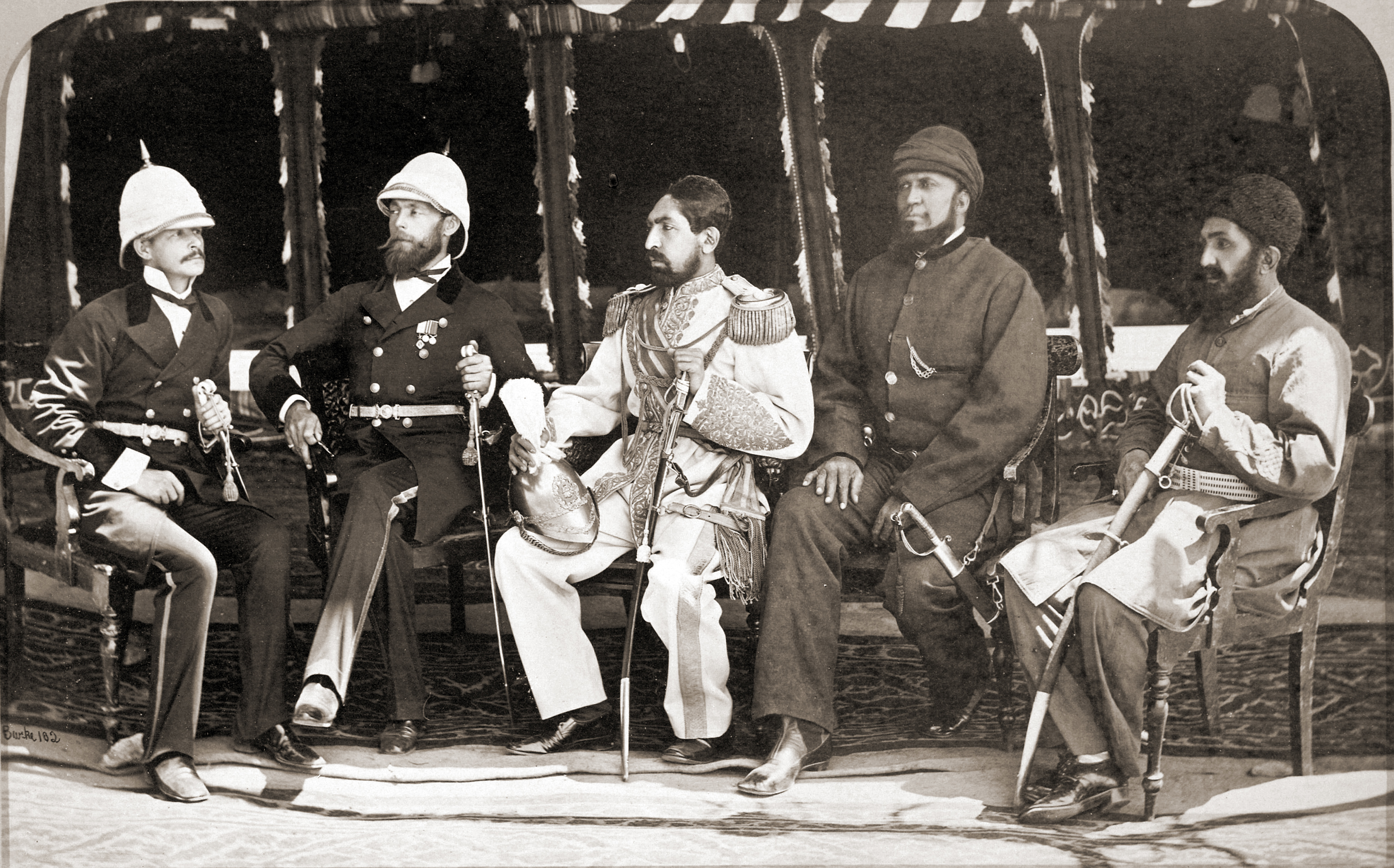
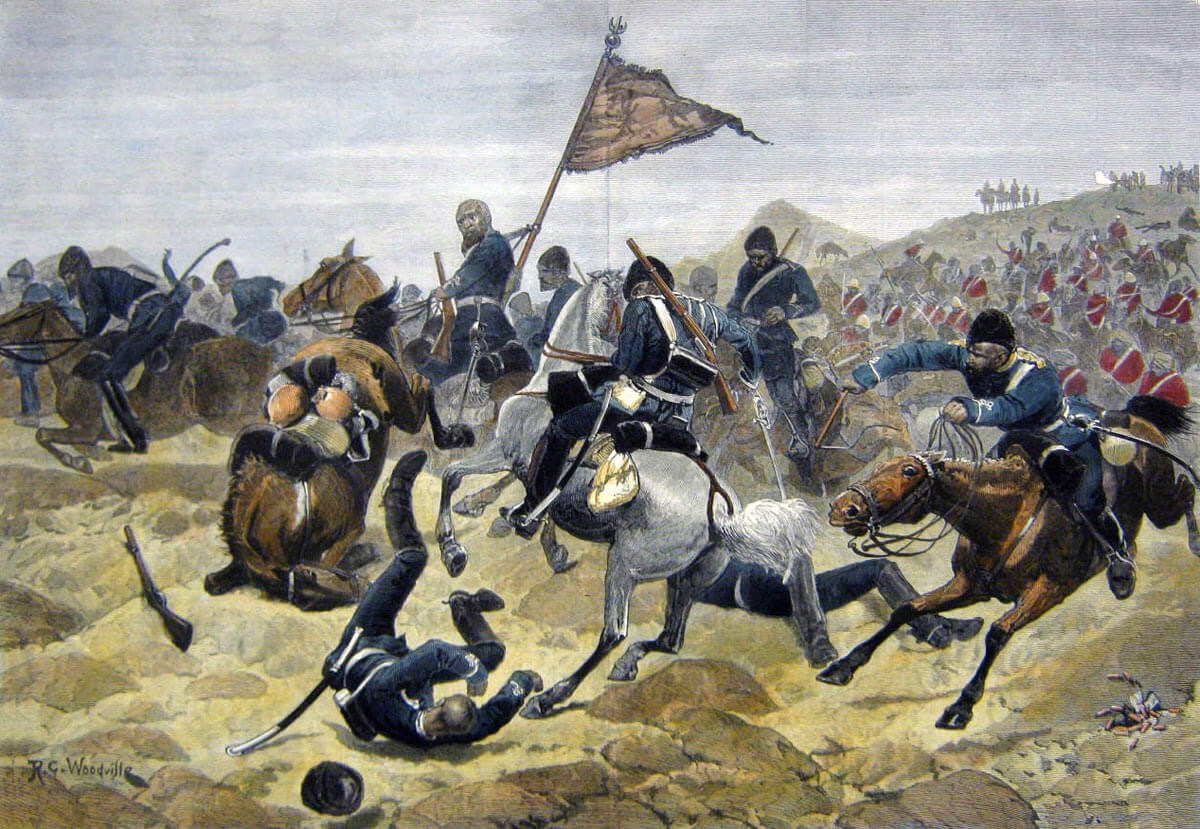
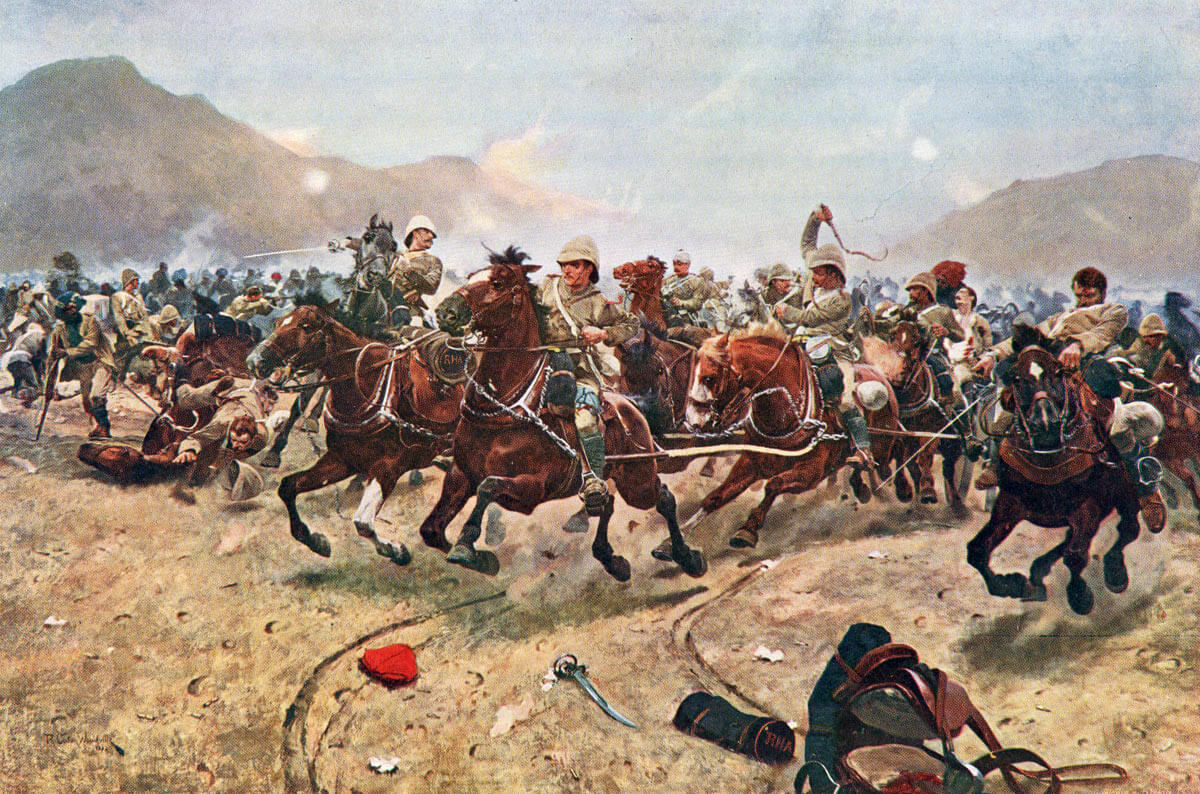
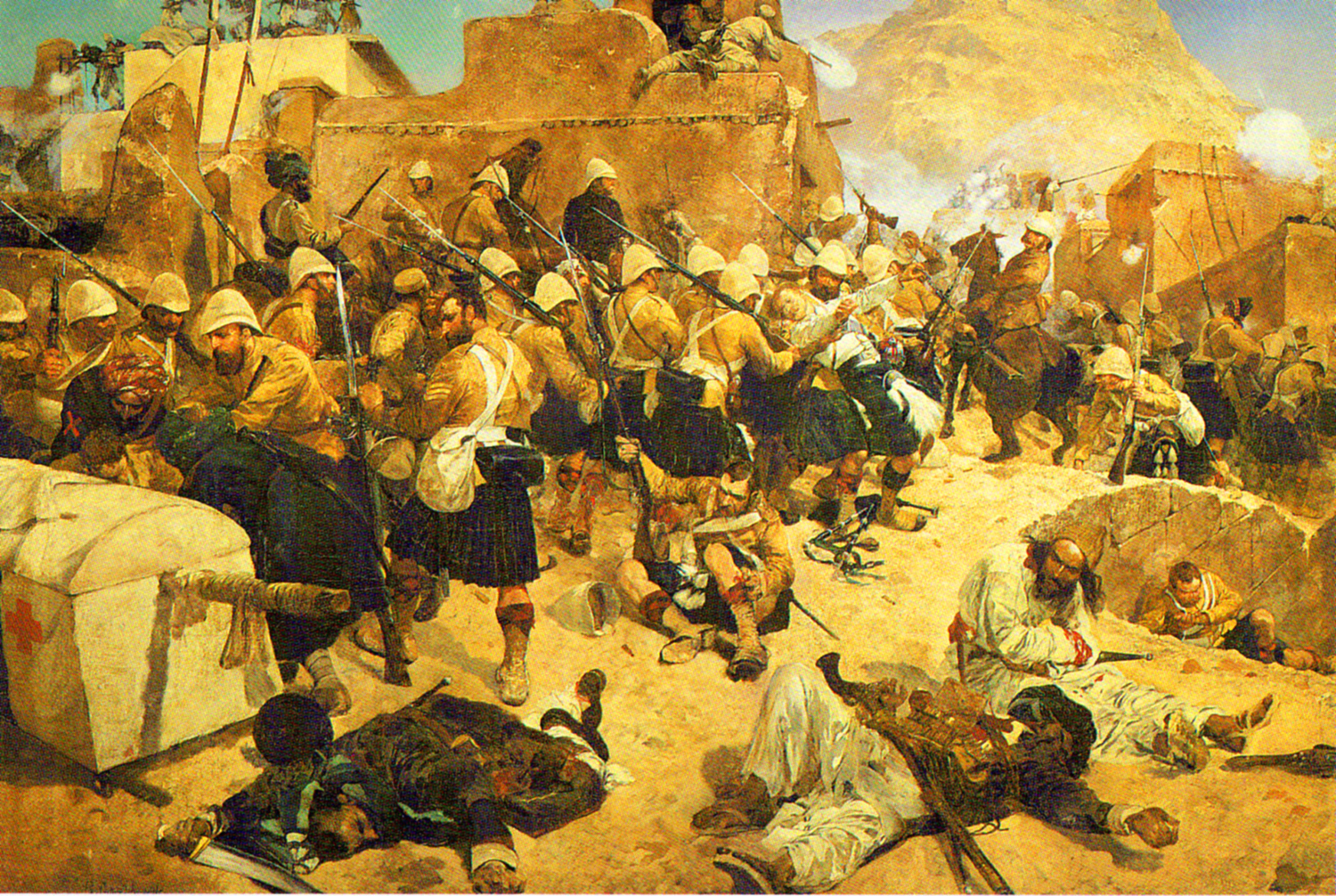
- Clockwise from top left: The Royal Norfolk Regiment opening shots at Ali Masjid; Engagement at Peiwar Kotal; 5th Punjab cavalry chasing the Afghan army at the Battle of Kabul; Battle of Kandahar; Royal Horse Artillery fleeing at the Battle of Maiwand; Treaty of Gandamak
Date	21 November 1878 – 27 April 1881 (2 years, 5 months and 6 days)
Location	Afghanistan
Result	Anglo-Afzalid victory; Treaty of Gandamak; British withdrawal from Afghanistan; Abdur Rahman Khan established as Emir; Afghanistan becomes a de jure British protected state
Territorial changes	Kandahar re-ceded to Afghanistan. Districts of Quetta, Pishin, Sibi, Harnai & Thal Chotiali ceded to British India

Belligerents
(United Kingdom of Great Britain and Ireland) British Empire; India; Afzalids	Afghanistan; National Party

Commanders and leaders
Sam Browne British: Frederick Roberts; O'Moore Creagh; Donald Stewart; Herbert Macpherson; Charles Gough; William Massy; Thomas Baker; George Burrows; Henry Brooke †; Louis Cavagnari †; Walter Hamilton †; William Jenkyns †; Ambrose Kelly †; Charles Palliser †; John Nicholson †; Pertab Singh; Abdur Rahman Khan Afzalids: Mir Baba Khan; Mir Omar; Sultan Murad	Sher Ali Khan #; Mohammad Yaqub Khan (POW); Mohammad Musa Khan (POW); Mohammad Ayub Khan; Afghanistan: Habibullah Khan; Daoud Shah Khan; Ghulam Haidar Khan; Faiz Mohammad Khan; Mir Akhor; Karim Khan; Nek Mohammad Khan; Malalai of Maiwand †; Din Mohammad Andar (POW); Mohammad Jan Khan; Mir Bacha Khan; Mohammad Usman Khan

Casualties and losses
Total: 10,000+ 1,850+ killed or died of wounds 8,000+ died of disease	Total: Unknown; 5,000+ killed in major battles

The Second Anglo-Afghan War (Note: Pashto: د افغان او انگرېز دويمه جگړه, romanized: Də Afğān au Angrez dwayəma jagṛa [d̪ə ʔäʊ.ɣɑn/ʔäp.ɣɑn ʔäʊ ʔäŋg.ɾez d̪wä.jə.mä d͡ʒäg.ɽä]; Persian: جنگ دوم انگلیس و افغان, romanized: Jang-i duwum-i Afğān wa Inglīs [d͡ʒäŋg‿ɪ d̪uː.jʊ́m‿ɪ/d̪ʊ.wʊ́m‿ɪ ʔäv.ɣɑ́ːn/ʔäf.ɣɑ́ːn ʔʊ ʔɪŋɡ.liːs]) was a military conflict fought between the British Raj and the Emirate of Afghanistan from 1878 to 1880, when the latter was ruled by Sher Ali Khan of the Barakzai dynasty, the son of former Emir Dost Mohammad Khan. The war was part of the Great Game between the British and Russian empires.

The war was split into two campaigns – the first began in November 1878 with the British invasion of Afghanistan from India. Sher Ali Khan opted to leave Kabul in order to seek political and military aid from the Russian Empire, and died in Mazar-e Sharif trying to reach the Russian border, leaving the throne to his son Mohammad Yaqub Khan. Ali's successor Yaqub immediately sued for peace and the Treaty of Gandamak was then signed on 26 May 1879. The British sent an envoy and mission led by Sir Louis Cavagnari to Kabul, but on 3 September this mission was massacred and the conflict was reignited by Ayub Khan which led to the abdication of his brother Yaqub.

During this period, Abdur Rahman Khan, an opponent of the British, began distinguishing himself as a possible successor candidate to become the Amir of Afghanistan through his exploits in northern Afghanistan. Eventually after moving on Kabul, he was crowned and then later recognized by the British as the ruler of Afghanistan.

The second campaign began when Ayub Khan, the governor of Herat, rebelled in July 1880 and marched on Kandahar, defeating the British at the battle of Maiwand. The campaign ended in September 1880 when the British decisively defeated Ayub Khan outside Kandahar. Abdur Rahman Khan, now the sole ruler, created the buffer the British wanted between the Raj and the Russian Empire. British and Indian soldiers then withdrew from Afghanistan.

== Background ==
A significant political group in Afghanistan at the time were the Afzalids. The Afzalids were originally supporters of Mohammad Afzal Khan to the throne of Afghanistan during the civil war on Dost Mohammad's succession. The Afzalids were eventually defeated by Sher Ali Khan but many fled in exile to Samarkand in the Russian Empire under the authority of Abdur Rahman Khan, who was actively given asylum by the Russian government and brought worries to the British about a future pro-Russian claimant to the throne of Afghanistan.

On one such occasion, the Bukharans aided Muhammad Ishaq Khan, a son of Mohammad Azam Khan. He occupied Aqcha, but was later defeated. Following his defeat, the Afghan governor of Balkh, Muhammad Khan, purged much of the province of Afzalid supporters, seizing lands and exacting imprisonment and execution on those thought to be sympathizers. Districts that had aided the rebellion faced hefty fines, and the rulers of the Chahar Wilayat were mandatorily forced to re-affirm their allegiance to Sher Ali Khan by traveling to Kabul every year. In 1875, Husain Khan, the ruler of Maimana, refused to honour his oath and executed several government officials, declaring allegiance under the ruler of Bukhara. The rebellion was quelled, however when the leaders of the insurrection were brought before Sher Ali, he refused to execute them in honour of their former oaths, and instead had Muhammad Khan killed. These circumstances of events brought further support to the Afzalids in Samarkand, with many Amirs of the Chahar Wilayat beginning to correspond with Abdur Rahman Khan and the Afzalid faction.

After tension between Russia and Britain in Europe ended with the June 1878 Congress of Berlin, Russia turned its attention to Central Asia. That same summer, Russia sent an uninvited diplomatic mission to Kabul. Sher Ali Khan, the Amir of Afghanistan, tried unsuccessfully to keep them out. Russian envoys arrived in Kabul on 22 July 1878, and on 14 August, the British demanded that Sher Ali accept a British mission too. The British informed Sher Ali that a British mission would arrive in Kabul as well with or without his consent. However, as news of this arrived, Sher Ali's son and heir, Abdullah Jan had died. With mourning and the funeral taking place, nobody wished to show Sher Ali the British message. Eventually the message was revealed by his chamberlain. In a condolence message to Sher Ali, the British informed Sher Ali that the mission would leave Peshawar for Kabul in September.

Lord Lytton, the viceroy of India, ordered a diplomatic mission to set out for Kabul in September 1878 but the mission was turned back as it approached the eastern entrance of the Khyber Pass. A deadline was established for 20 November, where if a response was not given by the Afghan government, war would be declared. A day before the deadline, Sher Ali sent a messenger to Peshawar but failed to arrive on time, and turned away after news of the British invasion began.

== War ==
=== First phase ===
The first campaign began in November 1878 when a British force of about 50,000 fighting men, mostly Indians, was distributed into three military columns which penetrated Afghanistan at three different points. The British victories at the battles of Ali Masjid and Peiwar Kotal meant that the approach to Kabul was left virtually undefended by Afghan troops.

An alarmed Sher Ali left for Mazar-i-Sharif. This was done in hopes of the British overstretching their armies in Afghanistan, and make it difficult for the British to occupy parts of southern Afghanistan for an indefinite period of time, as well as that the Afghan tribes would eventually rise up. Further drawing off of Dost Mohammad Khan and Wazir Akbar Khan's tactics in the First Anglo-Afghan War. Mazar-i-Sharif was safe as well, with winter already ongoing, the British would be unable to pass the snow littered Hindu Kush. Alongside this, over 15,000 Afghan soldiers were present in Afghan Turkestan, which Sher Ali began preparing to assemble more men across Afghanistan. Sher Ali also attempted to appeal in person to the Russian Tsar for assistance, but he wasn't allowed to enter Russian territory, and their insistence was that he should seek terms of surrender from the British. He returned to Mazar-i-Sharif, where his health began to suffer, leading to his death on 21 February 1879.

Before leaving for Afghan Turkestan, Sher Ali released the surviving governors of the Chahar Wilayat that he had previously imprisoned. Upon Sher Ali's arrival to Mazar-i-Sharif, Sher Ali promised them the return of their states if they had assisted against the British in the war to come. Many of the governors, having been imprisoned for longer than a decade, all due to similar oaths being broken. As a result, seeing an opportunity to declare independence, Muhammad Khan, the former governor of Sar-I-Pul, alongside Husain Khan, the former governor of the Maimana Khanate, all declared independence against Afghan rule, rallying their own armies and expelling Afghan garrisons. A wave of Turkmen raids also began into Afghan Turkestan as a result, seeing some 6,000 women being enslaved, with forces from Sher Ali to repel the raids being defeated.

With Sher Ali's death, a tumultuous period began over his succession. One of his sons, Muhammad Ali Khan, attempted to seize Takhtapul, however the garrison mutinied, forcing him to move south towards Dai Zangi, where he began assembling an army against Yaqub Khan.

Yaqub Khan was declared the new Amir, with many sardars that were thought to have ties with the Afzalid faction were imprisoned. In Mazar-i-Sharif, Yaqub Khan's son, Muhammad Musa, assembled a force and seized Takhtapul, sending the leader of the mutineers to Kabul, where he was executed. Ayub Khan, supporting his brother's succession, did not oppose him. However, much of the military forces and officers in Balkh and Herat instead supported the Afzalids. Ayub Khan began facing anarchy in Herat, with much of the forces from the expelled from Maimana demanding payment. Ayub Khan sent numerous requests to Mazar-i-Sharif, imminently requesting aid in cash. Despite receiving funds, the troops began rioting, and were turned away by Ayub Khan towards Yaqub Khan, stating he would be capable of paying them.

=== Treaty ===
With British forces occupying Kabul, Sher Ali's son and successor, Yaqub Khan, signed the Treaty of Gandamak on 26 May 1879. According to this agreement and in return for an annual subsidy and vague assurances of assistance in case of foreign aggression, Yaqub relinquished control of Afghan foreign affairs to Britain. British representatives were installed in Kabul and other locations, and their control was extended to the Khyber and Michni passes, and Afghanistan ceded various North-West Frontier Province areas and Quetta to Britain, including the strategic fort of Jamrud. Yaqub Khan also renounced all rights to interfering in the internal affairs of the Afridi tribe. In return, Yaqub Khan only received an annual subsidy of 600,000 rupees, with the British pledging to withdraw all forces from Afghanistan excluding Kandahar.

However, on 3 September 1879 an uprising in Kabul led to the slaughter of Sir Louis Cavagnari, the British representative, along with his guards, and staff – provoking the next phase of the Second Afghan War.

=== Second phase ===
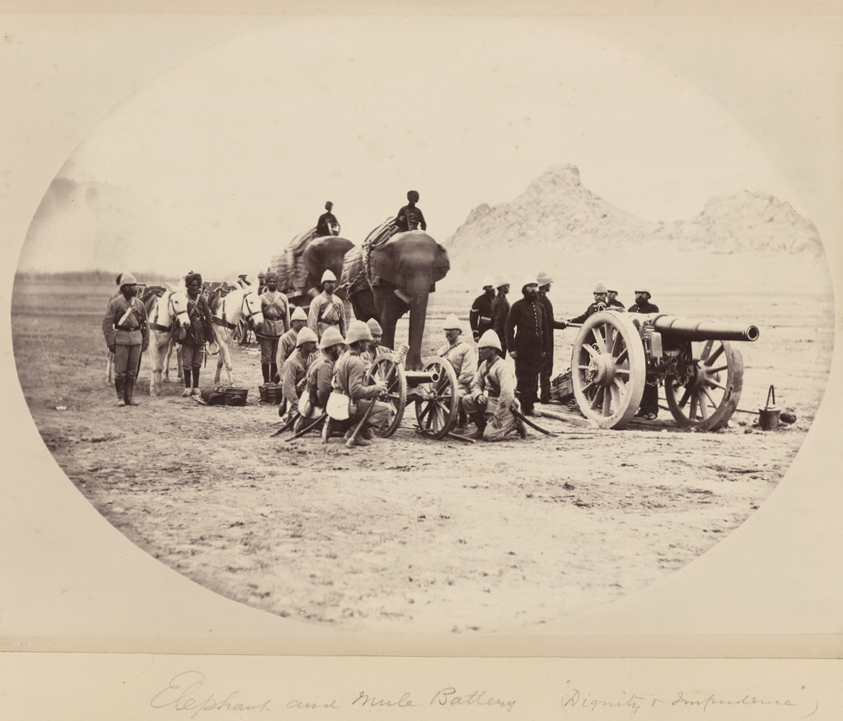
Titled "Dignity & Impudence" for stereotypic personality traits of elephants and mules respectively, this photograph by John Burke shows an elephant and mule battery during the Second Anglo-Afghan War. The mule team would have towed the small field gun, which appears to be a Rifled Muzzle Loader (RML) 7-pounder mountain gun. The elephant towed the larger gun, apparently a Rifled breech loader (RBL) 40-pounder Armstrong

Major General Sir Frederick Roberts led the Kabul Field Force over the Shutargardan Pass into central Afghanistan, defeated the Afghan Army at Charasiab on 6 October 1879, and occupied Kabul two days later. Ghazi Mohammad Jan Khan Wardak, and a force of 10,000 Afghans, staged an uprising and attacked British forces near Kabul in the Siege of the Sherpur Cantonment in December 1879. The rebellion collapsed after the failure of a direct attack on Roberts' force on 23 December. Yaqub Khan, suspected of complicity in the massacre of Cavagnari and his staff, was obliged to abdicate. The British considered a number of possible political settlements, including partitioning Afghanistan between multiple rulers or placing Yaqub's brother Ayub Khan on the throne, but also looked to install his cousin Abdur Rahman Khan (half nephew of the former Sher Ali) as Amir instead.

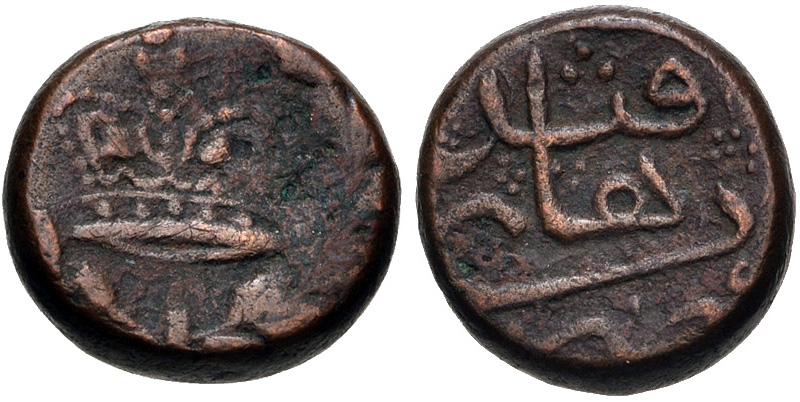
A rare coin minted during the occupation of Kandahar. British Crown within wreath on the obverse, Arabic inscription in four lines on the reverse. These issues were struck under local authorities who routinely recalled and devalued the coppers. This abusive practice led to a great variety of types, often featuring various animal or flower motifs. Accordingly, the types on this coin were likely not ordered by the occupation authorities, but rather placed by an opportunistic engraver eager to please the occupiers.

=== Exploits of Abdur Rahman Khan ===
Abdur Rahman Khan meanwhile had been in exile in Turkestan. Upon the death of Sher Ali Khan he requested from the Russians to enter Afghanistan as a claimant of the throne. This request was denied. However, following Yaqub Khan's abdication, as well as the British occupation of Kabul, the Russians allowed Abdur Rahman Khan to re-enter Afghanistan. Abdur Rahman made way for Badakhshan, whose ruler he had marriage ties with. While on route, he did a pilgrimage to the shrine of Khwaja Ahrar, taking his banner after claiming he had a vision that ensured victory. The ruler of Badakhshan did not permit Abdur Rahman to ford the Amu Darya, to which Abdur Rahman did so further downstream. He then crossed a mountain pass while it snowed, arriving at Rostaq, where its garrison defected. With the fall of Rostaq, Abdur Rahman met the Mir of Badakhshan in battle, forcing him to flee to Chitral while Abdur Rahman annexed Badakhshan.

Abdur Rahman requested from Sultan Murad of Kunduz for military access so he could advance on Kabul. This request was denied. However, Ghulam Haidar Khan, Yaqub's governor of Balkh, attacked Kunduz, occupying it, and forcing Sultan Murad to flee to Fayzabad. Sultan Murad then aligned with Abdur Rahman, and encouraged rebellion against Ghulam Haidar, with the commander of Takhtapul declaring for Abdur Rahman. Ghulam Haidar fled across the Amu Darya, leaving the entirety of Afghan Turkestan under Abdur Rahman's control.

The British, eyeing for a suitable candidate to be the ruler of Afghanistan, scouted Abdur Rahman Khan, and began negotiating with him. Abdur Rahman was reluctant to accept such a proposal, as he considered himself an opponent of the British, with his own men wishing for Jihad against them. While negotiations continued, the British considered numerous political solutions, including dividing Afghanistan into numerous kingdoms. The British were seeking to a quick conclusion to the war due to the resignation of Lytton, with his successor, the Marquis of Ripon, wishing to withdraw all British troops from Afghanistan as quickly as possible. With this, the British no longer wished to uphold a British envoy in Afghanistan. However, both sides continued to differ, with the British wishing to keep Kandahar under their control with Sardar Sher Ali as governor, while Abdur Rahman saw it imperative as a part of Afghanistan.

Believing that the British might withdraw, Abdur Rahman Khan arrived in Charikar sometime in July 1880, where religious leaders from regions such as Panjshir, Kohistan, and Tagab welcomed his arrival. On 19 July, the British informed Abdur Rahman that they were prepared to recognize him as the ruler of Afghanistan, inviting him to Kabul for a ceremony. Abdur Rahman called a Jirga, with many tribal leaders declaring for him, while Abdur Rahman was declared the Amir of Kabul.

=== Ayub Khan's rebellion ===
Ayub Khan, who had been serving as governor of Herat, rose in revolt, defeated a British detachment at the Battle of Maiwand in July 1880 and besieged Kandahar. Roberts then led the main British force from Kabul and decisively defeated Ayub Khan on 1 September at the Battle of Kandahar, bringing his rebellion to an end.

== Aftermath ==
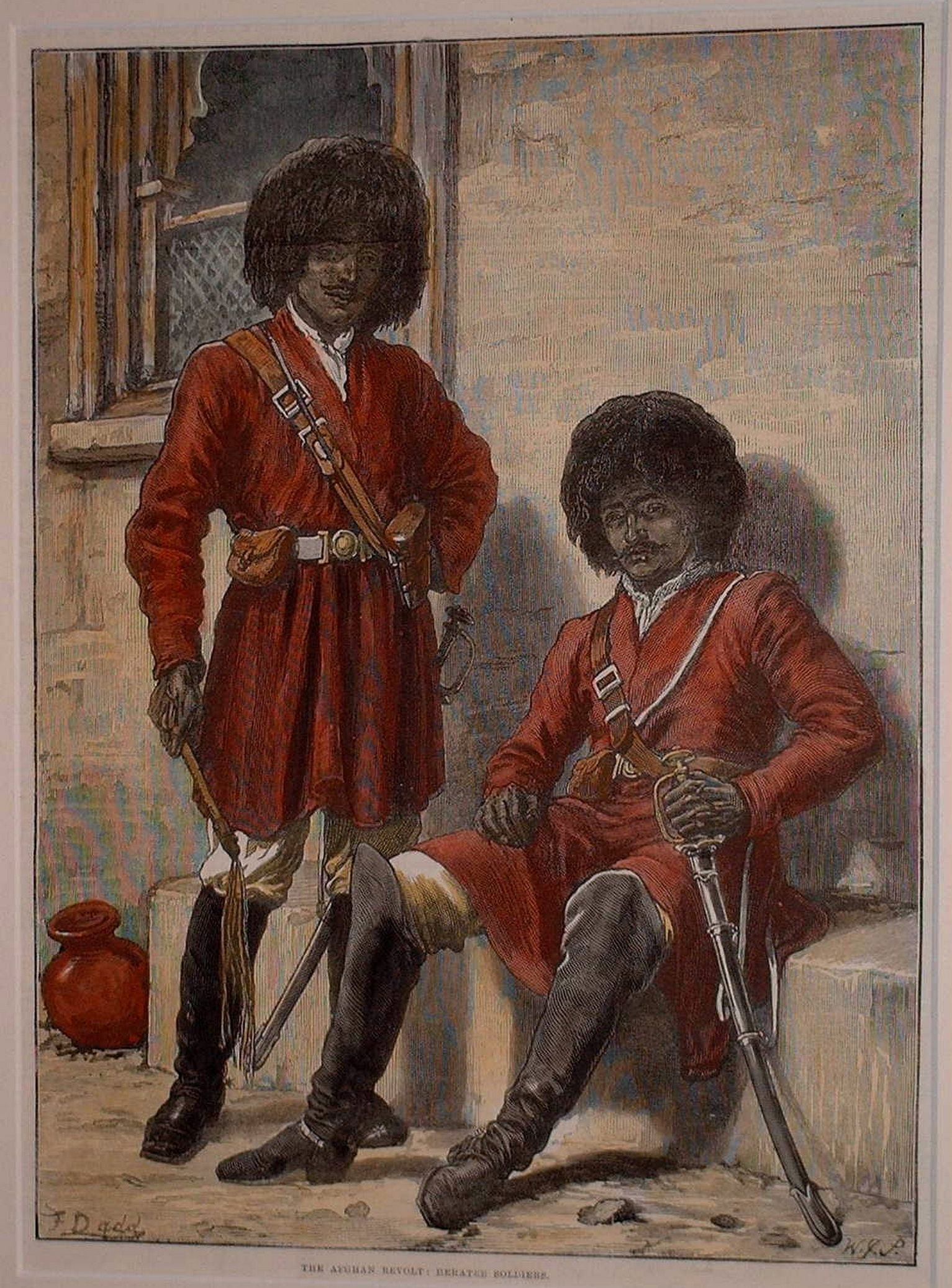
The Afghan revolt: Herati Soldiers 1879

With Ayub Khan defeated, the war was officially over with Abdur Rahman Khan ruling as Amir, he was seen as the real victor of the Second Anglo-Afghan War. Despite attempts by the British to hold on to Kandahar, they decided to return it to Afghanistan. Rahman confirmed the Treaty of Gandamak, whereby the British took control of the territories ceded by Yaqub Khan. The provocative policy of maintaining a British resident in Kabul was abandoned, but instead British Indian Muslim agents were to be left to smooth liaison between the governments. Britain would also handle Afghanistan's foreign policy in exchange for protection and a subsidy. The Afghan tribes maintained internal rule and local customs, and provided a continuing buffer between the British Raj and the Russian Empire. Ironically many of these policies had been desired by Sher Ali Khan, and war could have been prevented had they been implemented earlier.

The war was expensive for Britain, spending some 17 million pounds during the war, which was three times the estimated cost. The costs rose just before the British left in March 1881, estimating to be around 19.5 million pounds.

Rudyard Kipling may have been thinking of what some of the British survivors of the Anglo-Afghan wars had faced when he wrote in "The Young British Soldier":

When you're wounded and left on Afghanistan's plains,
And the women come out to cut up what remains,
Jest roll to your rifle and blow out your brains
An' go to your Gawd like a soldier.

— Barrack-Room Ballads, 1892

Despite attempts from the British to dissuade Afghanistan from Russian influence, Abdur Rahman Khan adopted an autocratic government similar to the Tsars of Russia, inspired by Peter the Great from his time in exile in Turkestan. Alongside this, despite the British attempting to prop up Afghanistan as a key ally, Abdur Rahman Khan often acted against the British, with atrocities horrifying even Queen Victoria, and he became known as the 'Iron Amir'. He also refused to give information regarding his troops, with his own autobiography criticizing British policy, while also violating the Lyall agreement by instead of allowing the British to oversee his diplomatic affairs, held them himself with numerous countries including Iran, the Ottoman Empire, and the German Empire. Abdur Rahman also wrote in pamphlets, encouraging Jihad against the British and the Russians, claiming both wished to end Afghanistan as a state. Senior British officials found it extremely difficult to further cooperate with Abdur Rahman Khan and Afghanistan due to the Turkestan atrocities, as well as his actions against the Hazaras. The British believed they had no other alternative but to support Abdur Rahman Khan, scoring a diplomatic victory for him.

Despite this, no further trouble resulted between Afghanistan and British India during Rahman's period of rule. The Russians kept well out of Afghan internal affairs, with the exception of the Panjdeh incident three years later, resolved by arbitration and negotiation after an initial British ultimatum.

In 1893, Mortimer Durand was dispatched to Kabul by British India to sign an agreement with Rahman for fixing the limits of their respective spheres of influence as well as improving diplomatic relations and trade. On November 12, 1893, the Durand Line Agreement was reached. This led to the creation of a new North-West Frontier Province.

== Timeline of battles ==
There were several decisive actions in the Second Anglo–Afghan War, from 1878 to 1880. Here are the battles and actions in chronological order. An asterisk (*) indicates a clasp was awarded for that particular battle with the Afghanistan Medal.

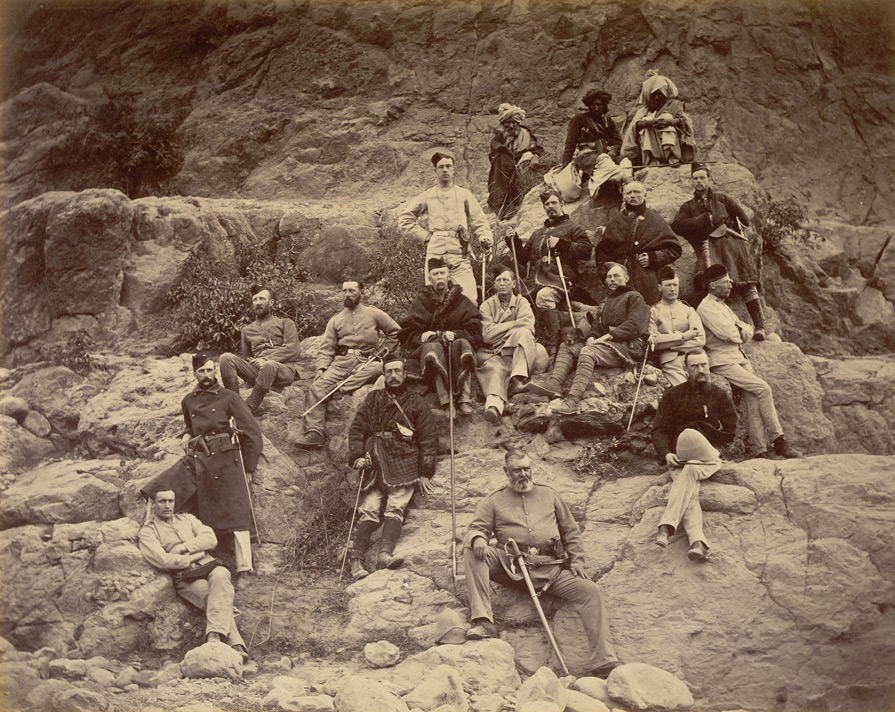
British team at the site of the Battle of Ali Masjid

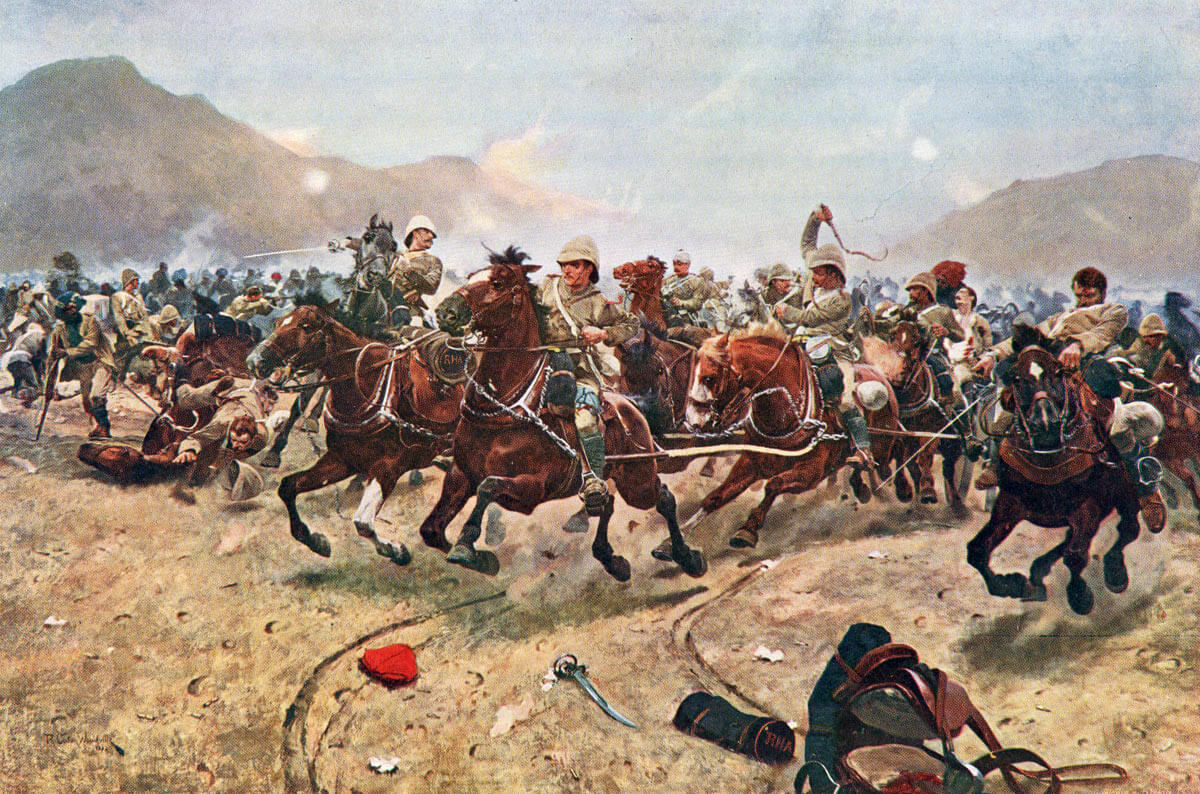
British Royal Horse Artillery withdrawing at the Battle of Maiwand

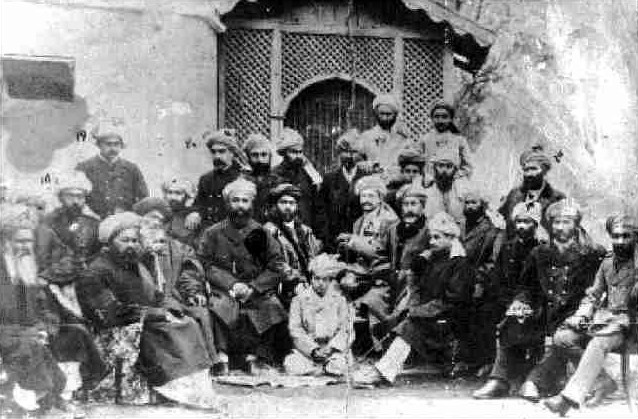
Afghan victors of the Battle of Maiwand

=== 1878 ===
1. Battle of Ali Masjid* (British victory)
2. Battle of Peiwar Kotal* (British victory)

=== 1879 ===
1. Action at Takht-i-Pul (British victory)
2. Action at Matun (British victory)
3. Battle of Khushk-i-Nakud (British victory)
4. Battle of Fatehabad (Afghan victory)
5. Siege of the British Residency in Kabul (Afghan victory)
6. Battle of Kam Dakka (British victory)
7. Battle of Charasiab* (British victory)
8. Battle of Shajui
9. Battle of Karez Mir
10. Battle of Takht-i-Shah
11. Battle of Asmai Heights* (Afghan victory)
12. Siege of Sherpur (Kabul)* (British victory)

=== 1880 ===
1. Battle of Ahmed Khel* (British victory)

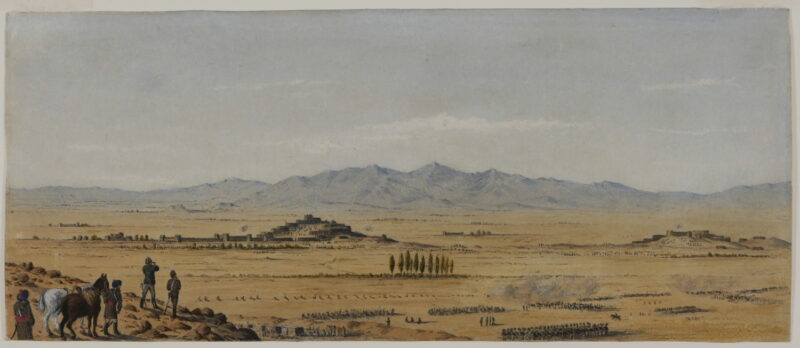
Action at Arzu, 23 April 1880, by Lieutenant John Frederick Irwin

1. Battle of Arzu
2. Second Battle of Charasiab (British victory)
3. Battle of Maiwand (Afghan victory)
4. Battle of Deh Koja (Afghan Victory)
5. Battle of Kandahar* (British victory)

=== 1881 ===
1. Evacuation of Kandahar (and Afghanistan) by British-led forces

== Order of battle ==
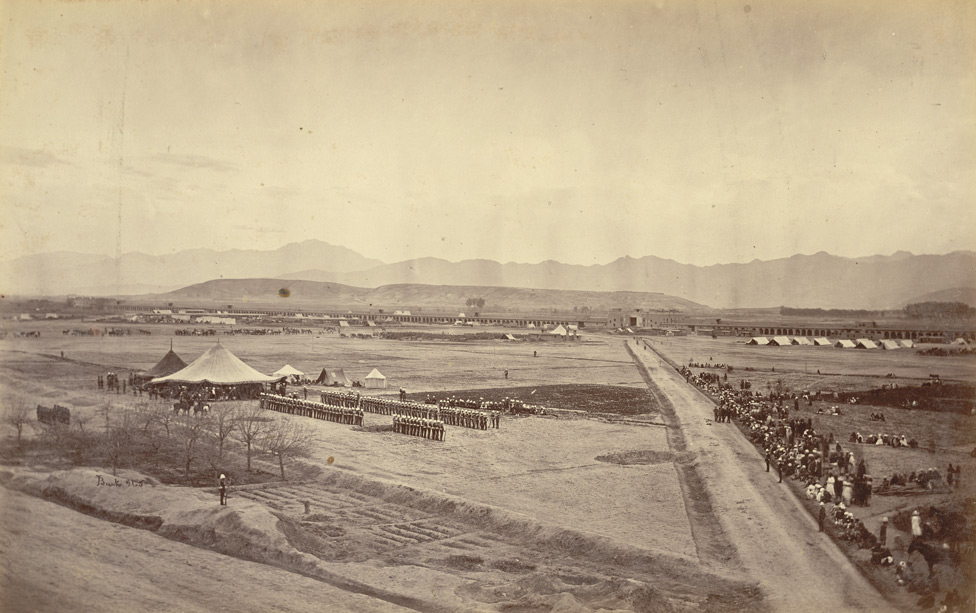
Durban Maidan of Sherpur Cantonment in 1879.

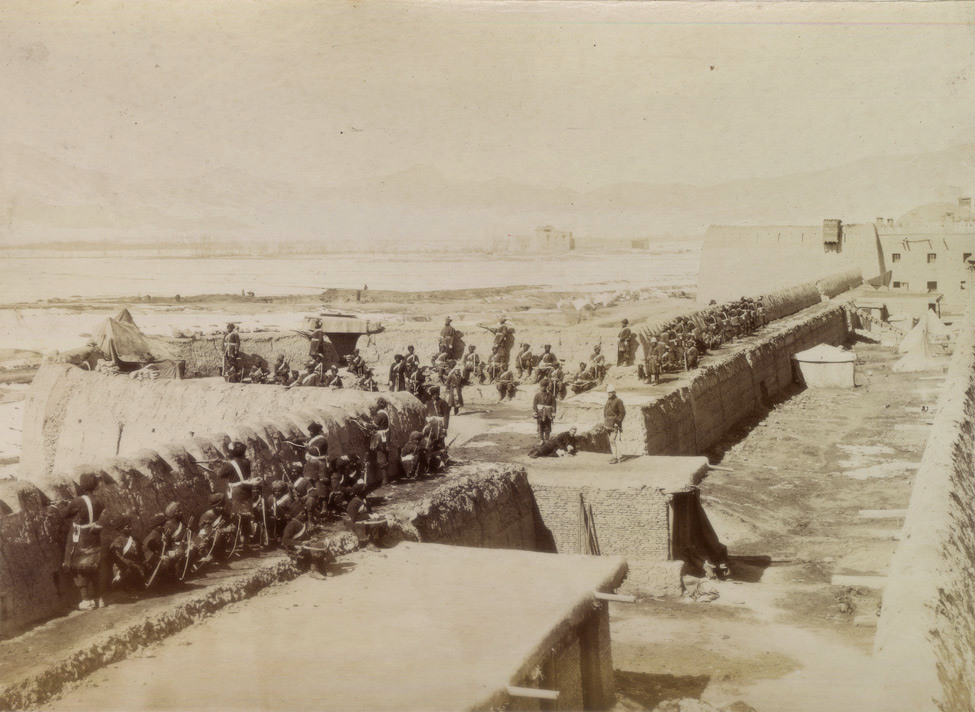
Bengal Sapper and Miners Bastion in Sherpur cantonment.

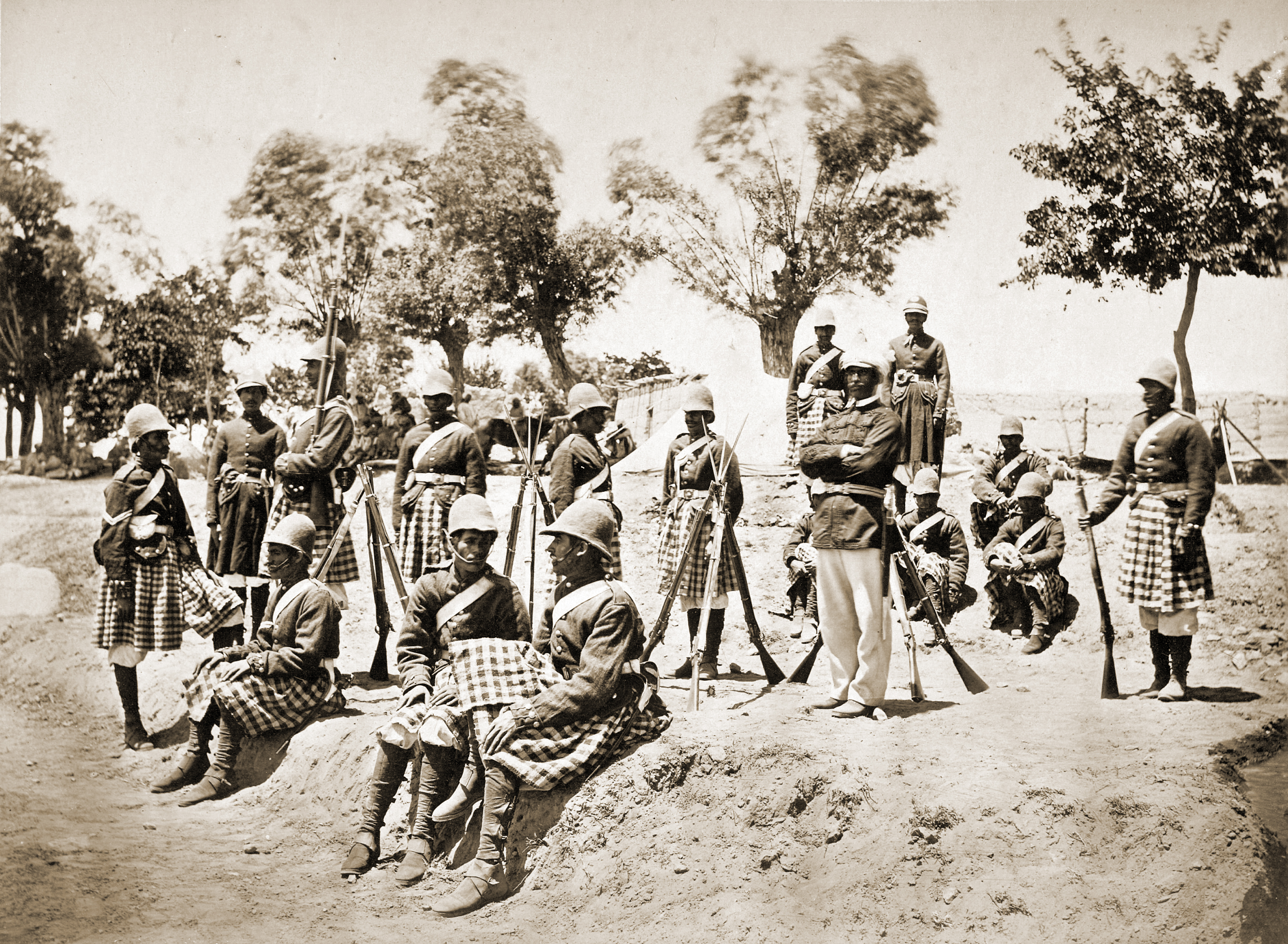
Highlanders of Amir Yaqub at Gandamak

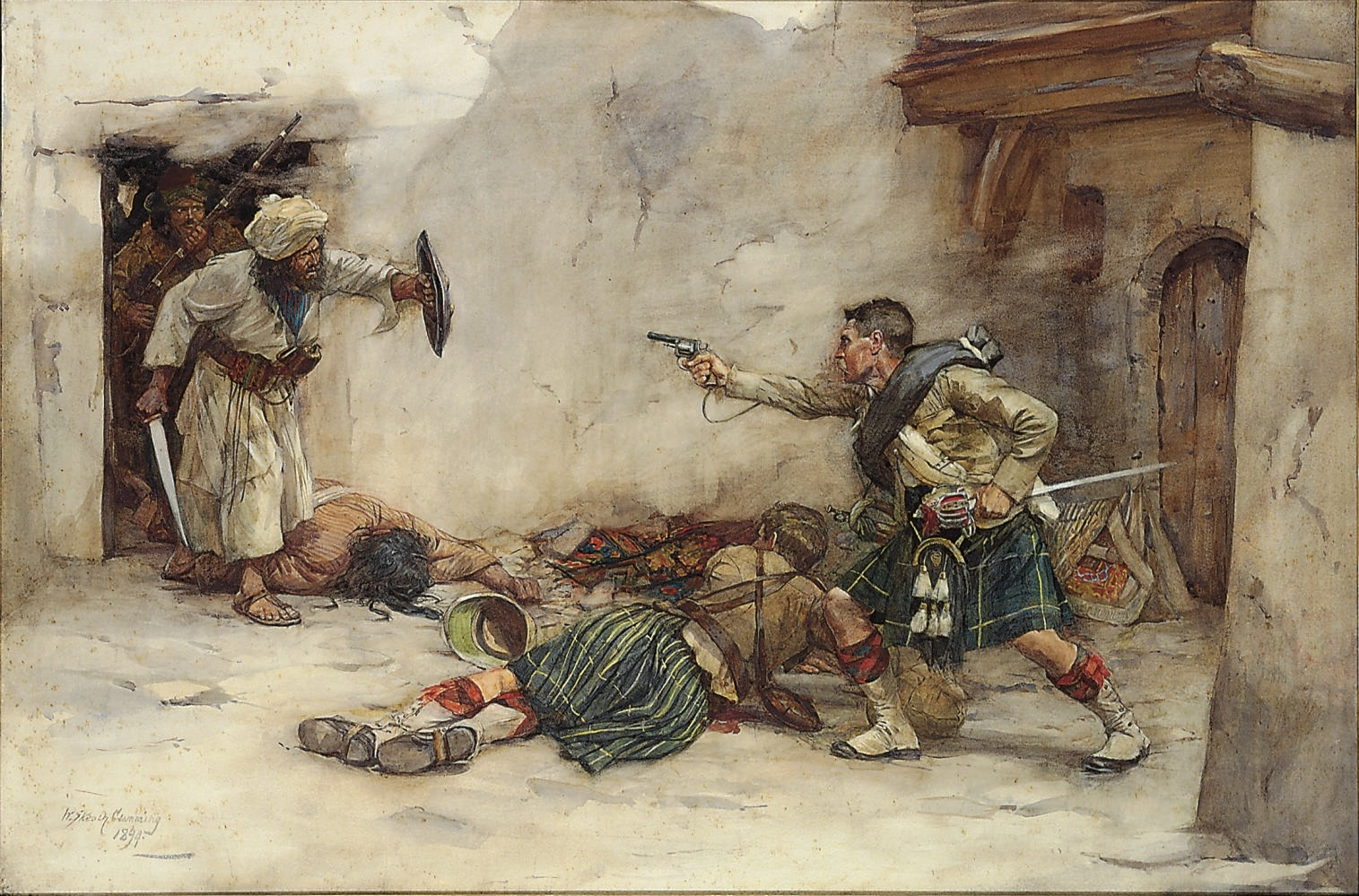
Drummer James Roddick of the Gordon Highlanders defends a wounded officer during British attack at Gundi Mulla Sahibdad during the Battle of Kandahar

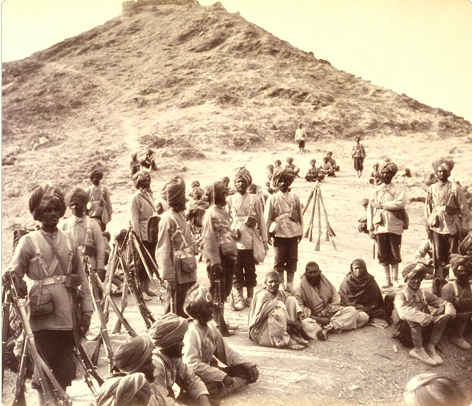
45th Rattray's Sikhs guard Afghan prisoners during an advance through the Khyber Pass

In November 1878, at the start of the war, the British established three Field Forces – designated Peshawar Valley, Kurram Valley and Kandahar respectively – each of which invaded Afghanistan by a different route.

- Peshawar Valley Field Force. Lieutenant General Sir Samuel Browne
  - Cavalry Brigade. Brigadier General C.J.S. Gough
    - 10th Hussars (2 squadrons)
    - 11th Probyn's Lancers
    - Guides Cavalry
  - Royal Artillery
  - First Infantry Brigade. Brigadier General H. T. Macpherson
    - 4th Battalion Rifle Brigade
    - 20th Brownlow's Punjabis
    - 4th Gurkha Rifles
  - Second Infantry Brigade. Brigadier General J. A. Tytler
    - 1st Battalion, 17th Leicestershire Regiment
    - Queen's Own Corps of Guides (infantry component)
    - 51st Sikhs
  - Third Infantry Brigade. Brigadier General F. Appleyard
    - 81st North Lancashire Regiment
    - 14th Sikhs
    - 27th Punjabis
  - Fourth Infantry Brigade. Brigadier General W. Browne
    - 51st King's Own Yorkshire Light Infantry
    - 6th Jat Light Infantry
    - 45th Sikhs
- Kurram Valley Field Force. Major General Roberts
  - Cavalry Brigade. Brigadier General Hugh Gough
    - 10th Hussars (1 squadron)
    - 12th Cavalry
    - 25th Cavalry
  - Royal Artillery. Colonel A. H. Lindsay
  - First Infantry Brigade. Brigadier General A. H. Cobbe
    - 2nd Battalion, 8th Foot
    - 23rd Pioneers
    - 29th Punjabis
    - 58th Vaughan's Rifles
  - Second Infantry Brigade. Brigadier General J. B. Thelwell
    - 72nd Seaforth Highlanders
    - 21st Punjabis
    - 56th Rifles
    - 5th Gurkha Rifles
- Kandahar Field Force. Lieutenant General Donald Stewart
  - First Division
    - Cavalry Brigade. Brigadier General Walter Fane
      - 15th Hussars
      - 8th Bengal Cavalry
      - 19th Fane's Lancers
    - Royal Artillery. Brigadier General C. G. Arbuthnot
    - First Infantry Brigade. Brigadier General R. Barter
      - 2nd Battalion King's Royal Rifles
      - 15th Sikhs
      - 25th Punjabis
    - Second Infantry Brigade. Brigadier General W. Hughes
      - 59th East Lancashire Regiment
      - 12th Kelat-i-Ghilzai Regiment
      - 1st Gurkha Rifles
      - 3rd Gurkha Rifles
  - 2nd Division. Major General M A Biddulph
    - Cavalry Brigade. Brigadier General C. H. Palliser
      - 21st Daly's Horse
      - 22nd Sam Browne's Horse
      - 35th Scinde Horse
    - Artillery Colonel Le Mesurier
    - First Infantry Brigade. Brigadier General R. Lacy
      - 70th East Surrey Regiment
      - 19th Punjabis
      - 127th Baluchis
    - Second Infantry Brigade. Brigadier General Nuttall
      - 26th Punjabis
      - 32nd Pioneers
      - 55th Coke's Rifles
      - 129th Baluchis

At the end of the first phase of the war in May 1879, the Peshawar Force was withdrawn, while the Kandahar Force was reduced in size. In September 1879, at the beginning of the second phase, additional British and Indian Army units were despatched to Afghanistan, while the Kurram Valley Force was reinforced, and redesignated the Kabul Field Force.

== See also ==
- First Anglo-Afghan War
- Third Anglo-Afghan War
- Invasions of Afghanistan
- Waziristan campaign (1919–1920)
- Waziristan campaign (1921–1924)
- Waziristan campaign (1936–1939)
- Pink's War
- Waziristan rebellion (1948-1954)
- Military history of Afghanistan
- European influence in Afghanistan
- Sherpur Cantonment

== Bibliography ==
- Barthorp, Michael (2002). Afghan Wars and the North-West Frontier 1839–1947. London: Cassell. ISBN 0-304-36294-8.
- Barfield, Thomas (2010). Afghanistan: A Cultural and Political History. Princeton University Press. ISBN 978-0-691-14568-6.
- Blood, Peter R, ed. (1996). Pakistan: A Country Study. Diane Publishing. ISBN 9780788136313.
- Gathorne-Hardy, Gathorne (December 1878), The Afghan War: a speech delivered in the House of Lords by the Right Hon. Viscount Cranbrook (Secretary State of India) on Monday, December 9th, 1878 (1st ed.), Westminster: National Union of Conservative and Constitutional Associations, Wikidata Q19077572
- Farwell, Byron (1973). Queen Victoria's Little Wars. London: Allen Lane. ISBN 0713904577.
- Hanna, Henry Bathurst (1904). The Second Afghan War, 1878–79–80: Its Causes, Its Conduct and Its Consequences. Vol. 2. Archibald Constable & Co.
- Johnson, Robert (2011). The Afghan Way of War: How and Why They Fight. Oxford University Press. ISBN 9780199912568.
- Onley, James (March 2009), "The Raj Reconsidered: British India's Informal Empire and Spheres of Influence in Asia and Africa" (PDF), Asian Affairs, 11 (1), archived from the original (PDF) on 9 October 2022
- Roberts, Sir Frederick (1897). Forty-one Years in India. London: Macmillan & Co.
- Walker, Phillip Francis. Afghanistan: A Short Account of Afghanistan, Its History, and Our Dealings with It. London: Griffith and Farran (1881).
- Wilkinson-Latham, Robert (1977). North-West Frontier 1837–1947. London: Osprey Publishing. ISBN 0-85045-275-9.
