= Din Mohammad Andar =

Sardar (Note: Persian: سردار, romanized: Sardār [säɾ.d̪ɑ́ːɾ]) Musk of the Universe (Note: Persian: مشک عالم, romanized: Mushk-i Ālam [mʊʃkʰ‿ɪ ʔɑː.lám]) Din Mohammad Andar
- Native name: دين محمد اندړ
- Born: 1790 Andar, Durrani Empire
- Died: 1886 (aged 95–96) Ghazni, Emirate of Afghanistan
- Cause of death: Died in captivity
- Conflicts: Second Anglo-Afghan War (POW)

Din Mohammad Andar, (Note: Pashto: دين محمد اندړ, romanized: Din Muhammad Andaṛ [d̪in mu.wa.mad̪ ʔan.d̪aɻ, d̪in mu.ham.mad̪ ʔan.d̪aɻ]; Persian: دین محمد اندر, romanized: Dīn Mohammad Andar [d̪iːn mʊ.wäm.mád̪ ʔän.d̪áɾ, d̪iːn mo̞.ɦäm.mád̪ ʔän.d̪áɾ]) famously known by his epithet as Mullah Mushk-i Alam Akhundzada, was a military general during the Second Anglo-Afghan War, as well as the supervisor of Mohammad Musa Khan during the latter's reign.

== Early life ==
Belonging to the Lakankhel sub-tribe of the Andar tribe of the Pashtuns, Din Mohammad was born in 1790 in Andar District's Gandahir village.

== Rise to power ==
Din received his education of Islamic jurisprudence and beliefs from Mullah Mohammad Wazir Kakar before studying in Laghman for two years, being a student of the famous scholar Mullah Abdul Hakim. He then travelled to Peshawar several times, and began memorizing the Quran, being taught by Abdul Malik Akhundzada. After completing his religious education, he established a religious school in which members of the Taliban had attained their education, hailing from many nearby provinces.

The locals of Ghazni led by Din would continuously wage the holy war of Jihad against the British. Withdrawing support for Abdur Rahman Khan due to the latter's alliance with British interests, he joined forces with other commanders like Mir Bacha Khan, Mohammad Jan Khan, Ghulam Haidar Khan, and Mohammad Usman Khan, to which a national uprising was launched against the British invasion and Afzalid rule in Afghanistan. Known for his bravery throughout the war, as well as his qualities, Din earned the title "Musk of the Universe".

== Death ==
As he fought against Abdur Rahman Khan and his men, he was eventually captured and imprisoned, dying a few more years in captivity in 1886.
