= Mohammad Jan Khan =

Afghan military commander (1835–1880)

Ghazi Mohammad Jan Khan
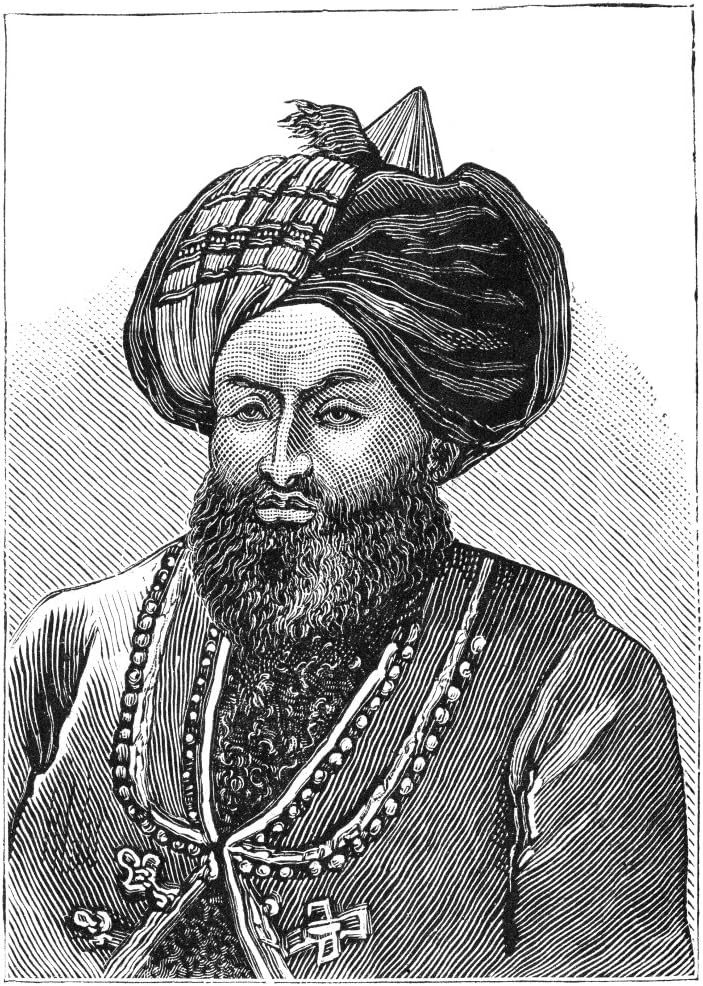
- A portrait of Mohammad Jan Khan (c. 1879)
- Native name: محمد جان خان وردک
- Born: 1835; Jaghatu, Emirate of Kabul
- Died: 1880 (aged 44–45) Kabul, Emirate of Afghanistan
- Conflicts: Second Anglo-Afghan War; Battle of Kabul (1879)

Ghazi Mohammad Jan Khan Wardak (Note: Pashto: محمد جان خان وردک, romanized: Muhammad Jān Xān Wardak [mu.wa.mad̪ d͡ʒɑn xɑn waɾ.d̪ak, mu.ham.mad̪ d͡ʒɑn xɑn waɾ.d̪ak]; Persian: محمد جان خان وردک, romanized: Mohammad Jān Khān Wardak [mʊ.wäm.mád̪ d͡ʒɑːn xɑːn wäɾ.d̪ák, mo̞.ɦäm.mád̪ d͡ʒɑːn xɑːn wäɾ.d̪ák]) (1835-1880) was an Afghan military commander who led the Afghan army against the British and the Afzalids during the Second Anglo-Afghan War.

Mohammad, along with Mir Bacha Khan led an army of 50,000 troops against the British-Indian army in the Battle of Kabul.
