= Mohammad Musa Khan (Afghanistan) =

Mohammad Musa Khan محمد موسی خان
- Sardar; Emir of Afghanistan

Emir of Afghanistan
- Reign: 19 October 1879 – 21 April 1880
- Coronation: 15 December 1879; Bala Hissar, Kabul, Emirate of Afghanistan
- Predecessor: Mohammad Yaqub Khan
- Successor: Abdur Rahman Khan (in Kabul); Mohammad Ayub Khan (in Herat)
- Born: 1868; Kabul, Emirate of Afghanistan
- Died: 1955 (aged 86–87); Kabul, Kingdom of Afghanistan
- Spouse: 2 wives: Masuma Begum A daughter of Abdul Salam Khan
- Issue: 1 son and 6 daughters: Mohammad Ali Khan Maliha Halima Begum Laila Bilqis Begum Tara Begum Mahbouba Begum Selina Begum Saleha Begum
- Dynasty: Barakzai dynasty
- Father: Mohammad Yaqub Khan
- Mother: Ruqaiya Begum
- Religion: Sunni Islam (until 1915); Roman Catholic Christianity (from 1915)

Mohammad Musa Khan Barakzai, (Note: Pashto: محمد موسی خان بارکزی, romanized: Muhammad Musā Xān Bārakzai [mu.wa.mad̪ muˈsɑ xɑn bɑ.ɾak.zaɪ, mu.ham.mad̪ muˈsɑ xɑn bɑ.ɾak.zaɪ]; Persian: محمد موسی خان بارکزی, romanized: Mohammad Mūsā Khān Bārakzay [mʊ.wäm.mád̪ muː.sɑ́ː xɑːn bɑː.ɾäk.záj, mo̞.ɦäm.mád̪ muː.sɑ́ː xɑːn bɑː.ɾäk.záj]) later known as Wilfred Mark Musa, was Emir of Afghanistan from the time of his father Mohammad Yaqub Khan's abdication in 1879 until his abdication in 1880.

== Early life ==
Mohammad Musa Khan was born in 1868 in Kabul to his father Mohammad Yaqub Khan, a member of the Mohammadzai branch of the Barakzai Pashtun tribe. He was crowned as the crown prince of Afghanistan by his father on 20 March 1879.

== Reign ==
Following his father's abdication after the British occupation of Kabul driven from the Siege of the British Residency in Kabul, Mohammad Musa Khan succeeded his father's position at 11 years of age, under the guidance and supervision of Din Mohammad Andar, and had Ghazni as his de facto capital.

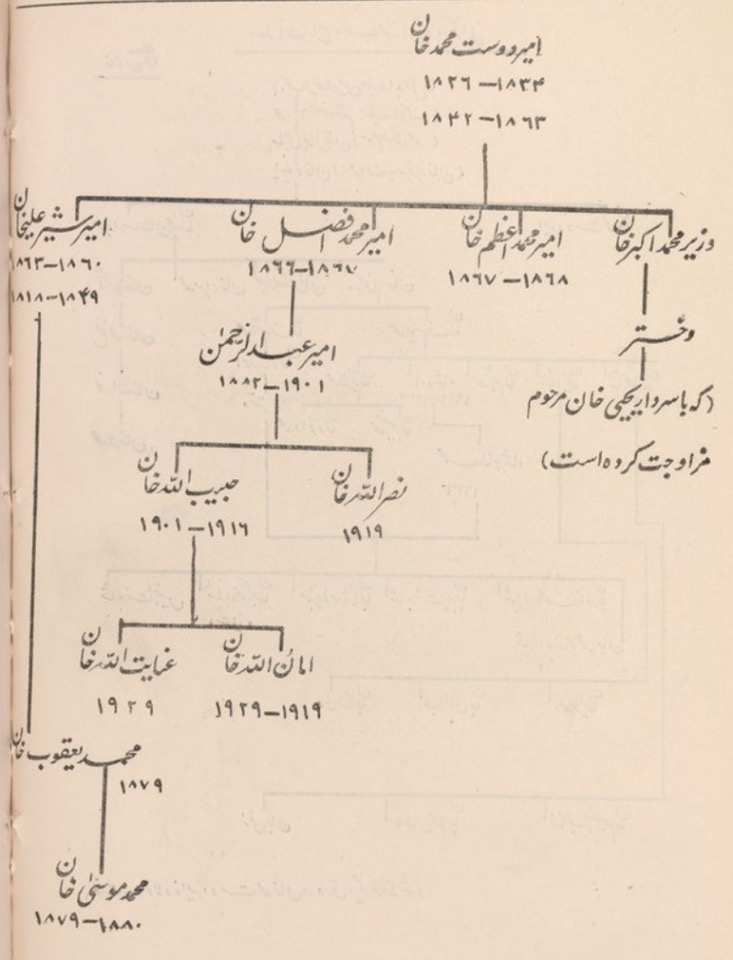
Recorded tree of descendants of Dost Mohammad Khan as emirs of Afghanistan

== Exile and death ==
Musa later abdicated and fled to Tehran, Qajar Iran, staying there for 8 years before being granted a leave to settle with his father in Dehradun, British Raj, and moved to Meerut, following family quarrels. Musa returned to Afghanistan following a decree of general amnesty declared by Habibullah Khan in 1912, but returned to India, and was baptized as in 1915, assuming the name "Wilfred Mark Musa" from his honorific title as a crown prince as "Wali Ahad Mohammad Musa".

He permanently resided in Afghanistan following the Partition of India in 1947, living there until his death in 1951.
