= Mir Bacha Khan =

Arab chief during the Anglo-Afghan wars

- میر بچه خان
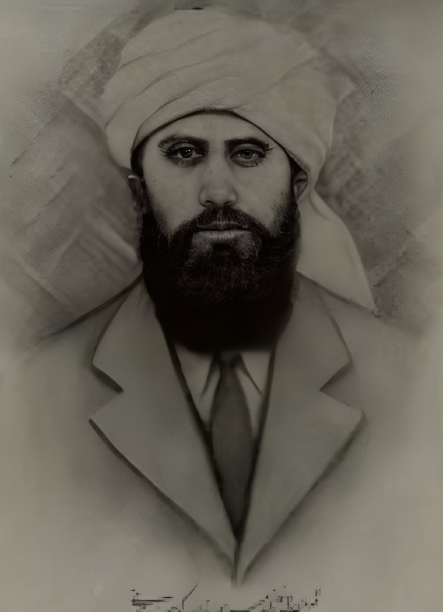
- Depiction of Mir Bacha Khan

Military Commander

Personal details
- Born: 1825 Mir Bacha Kot, Emirate of Kabul
- Died: 1905 (aged 79–80) Bagram, Emirate of Afghanistan
- Occupation: Military commander,

Ghazi Mir Bacha Khan (Note: Pashto: مير بچه خان, romanized: Mir Baca Xān [miɾ bä.t͡ʃä xɑn]; Persian: میر بچه خان, romanized: Mīr Bacha Khān [miːɾ bä.t͡ʃá xɑːn]) (Mir Bahauddin Kohdamani; (Note: Pashto: مير بهاء الدين کوهدامني, romanized: Mir Bahā' al-Din Kohdāmani [miɾ bɑ.wu.d̪in/bä.hɑ.wud̪.d̪in ko(h).d̪ɑ.mä.ni]; Persian: میر بهاء الدین کوهدامنی, romanized: Mīr Bahā' al-Dīn Kohdāmani [miːɾ bɑːɑː.w‿ʊd̪.d̪íːn/bä.ɦɑːʔ‿ud̪.d̪íːn kʰoː(ɦ).d̪ɑː.mä.níː]) 1825–1905) was one of the most well known Tajik chiefs who led the Tajiks of the Shamali Valley against the British in the Second Anglo-Afghan War. He was the son of Mir Darwish khan, an ethnic Tajik chief, who fought against the British in the First Anglo-Afghan War.

== Background ==
Mir Bahauddin was born into a religious Tajik family in northern Kabul. Like many in the area, his forefathers came from Shamali, notably Mir Bacha Kot. He was the youngest among his 9 brothers. Mir Bacha Khan completed primary education to the degree that necessary at the time. He knew both how to read and write and made use of his school (Muruj-e-Watan). He had good manners and excellent behavior. He behaved humbly towards people and was very kind towards both the poor and the rich. People started calling him Mir Bacha Khan because of his kindness and compassion. There was a poem that was whispered amongst the people in the name of Mir Bacha Khan:

"Mohammad Jan Khan is a man of the field!

Ayub Khan is a roaring lion!

Mir Bacha Khan is a messenger!

His powers are very immense!

Lets go eat grapes in the vineyards!"

This poem reflects the influence Mir Bahauddin had on the northern people of Afghanistan (specifically those from Shamali). It also represented the freedom and good sentiments of the northern Shamali people at the time (the Lands of the vineyards).

== Uprising ==
Mir Bacha Khan alongside his Kabuli tribesmen led one of the biggest uprisings against the British. Fifty-five days had passed since the beginning of the second British invasion of Afghanistan, during which scholars and clerics preached in all parts of the country and mobilized the people. In this way, the people had prepared for the general jihad, and as soon as Muhammad Yaqub Khan was deported to India, the last veil and hypocrisy of the British was torn apart, and the people in Kabul, Kohdaman, Kohistan and other parts of the country as patriotic people. Such as the likes of Muhammad Karim Khan, Ghulam Haidar Khan Kabuli, Mir Bacha Khan Kohdamani, Mir Ghulam Qadir Opiani and Mullah Abdul Ghafoor Langari and a dozen other of patriots and mujahideens who joined hands and stood up.

Mir Bacha Khan led the people of Kalakan, Murad Bey Castle, Shekar Dara and Kohdaman in their uprising against the British. They attacked the British forts in Afshar, Qargha and Kariz Mir. On December 9 1879, the forces of Mir Bacha Khan attacked the British artillery in Kariz mir inflicting huge casualties on the enemy forces, the British fled Kariz Mir to Sherpur.

The next day a battle was fought in Afshar, where the forces of Mir Bacha Khan became victorious. Later they planned to attack the enemy forces in the northern side of Wardak and Ghazni from the Arghandi road to Kotel Takht. With the help of Muhammad Jan Khan Wardagi they took control of the commanding points of Mount Asmai, Khurd and Bazar hills in the north of Kabul.

In short, the forces of Mir Bacha Khan Kohdamani and Muhammad Jan Khan Wardak swept through Kabul and ended up in Sherpur where the Siege of the Sherpur Cantonment took place. Mir Bacha Khan was successful and he ended up penetrating the northern side of the Sherpur Cantonment. He ended up retreating after he heard that Abdur Rahman Khan had arrived. Abdur Rahman Khan ended up taking command of the Kohistani forces and deemed Mir Bacha Khan as a traitor. He went to Herat and spent his final years there.
