= Siege of the British Residency in Kabul =

1879 battle of the Second Anglo-Afghan War

- Part of the Second Anglo-Afghan War
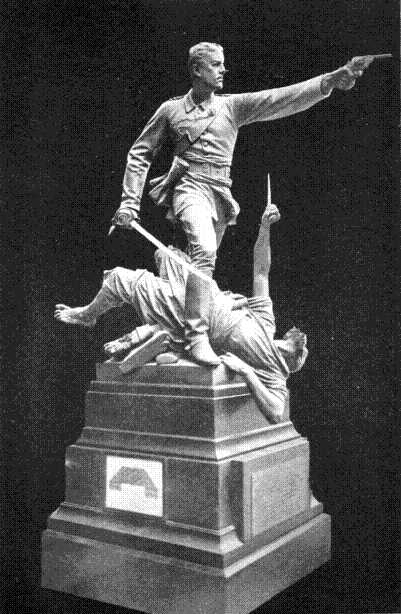
- Statue of Lt Walter Hamilton, VC during the attack on the residency
Date	3 September 1879
Location	Kabul, Afghanistan 34°31′58″N 69°09′57″E
Result	Afghan Victory

Belligerents
(United Kingdom) British Empire	Afghan mutineers

Commanders and leaders
(United Kingdom) Sir Louis Cavagnari †	No centralized leadership

Strength
75 men	2,000+ men

Casualties and losses
72 killed	600 killed
- Location within Kabul Siege of the British Residency in Kabul (Afghanistan)

The siege of the British Residency in Kabul was a military engagement of the Second Anglo-Afghan War. The British resident, Sir Louis Cavagnari, and his escort were massacred after an 8-hour siege by mutinous Afghan troops inside their Residency in Kabul. This event triggered the second phase of the war, during which an Anglo-Indian army invaded Afghanistan and captured Kabul.

== Prelude ==
During the second phase of the Second Anglo-Afghan War, British troops invaded Afghanistan, and forced the Amir Sher Ali Khan to flee. He was replaced by his son Mohammad Yaqub Khan, who immediately sued for peace. The resulting Treaty of Gandamak satisfied most British demands, including the annexation of several frontier districts, and the dispatch of a British envoy to Kabul to supervise Afghan foreign relations.

The political officer selected for this task was Sir Pierre Louis Napoleon Cavagnari, the son of an Italian aristocrat who had served for several years in the British colonial administration, in particular as District Commissioner of Peshawar.

Despite his experience of the region and his qualities as a diplomat, Cavagnari's appointment was viewed with some misgivings by British observers who knew his arrogant manners. General Sir Neville Chamberlain said of him that he was:

...more the man for facing an emergency than one to entrust with a position requiring delicacy and very calm judgement...If he were left at Cabul as our agent I should fear his not keeping us out of difficulties.

In addition, as the principal negotiator of the humiliating treaty of Gandamak, Sir Louis Cavagnari was hated by the Afghan populace. Despite this, he was chosen by the Viceroy of India, Lord Lytton, who trusted and appreciated him.

The envoy arrived in Kabul on July 24, 1879, with his assistant, a surgeon, and an escort of 75 soldiers of the elite Queen's Own Corps of Guides led by Lieutenant Walter Hamilton VC. The escort (25 Sowars of the Guides Cavalry and 50 Sepoys of the Guides Infantry) was kept small, so as to avoid provoking the Afghans.

== Siege ==
In Kabul, the delegation occupied a compound inside the Bala Hissar fortress, 250 yards (230 m) from the Amir's quarters. Throughout the summer, the situation remained calm, and Cavagnari's messages to Simla remained confident. In August, the situation began to deteriorate with the arrival of six Afghan army regiments from Herat, who marched into the Bala Hissar demanding two months of arrears in back-pay. They mocked their colleagues of the Kabul regiments who had been beaten by the British, and demanded to be led against the residency, but the Amir's officers managed to pacify them with the payment of some of the arrears. Cavagnari was warned of the danger by a retired Rissaldar-Major of the Guides, but he answered "Never fear. Keep up your heart, dogs that bark don't bite!" The Rissaldar insisted: "But these dogs do bite. Sahib, the residency is in great danger!", to which Cavagnari answered: "They can only kill the three or four of us here, and our deaths will be avenged". On September 2 he telegraphed his last message to Lord Lytton: "All is well in the Kabul Embassy."

The Guides Infantry in Afghanistan.

In the morning of September 3, the Herati regiments gathered once more inside the Bala Hissar, demanding their pay, but due to tax revenues not having been collected, only one month's pay was offered to them. At this point someone suggested that the British had gold in their Residency, and the mutinous soldiers went to ask Cavagnari to pay their salaries. When confronted with these demands, the envoy refused to pay, claiming that the matter was of no concern to the British government. A scuffle ensued, and several shots were fired by the British troops. The Afghan soldiers immediately returned to their cantonment to fetch their weapons, while Cavagnari prepared the compound as best he could, and sent a plea for help to the Amir.

Within the hour, 2,000 Afghan soldiers returned and invaded the Residency, which proved impossible to defend. It was surrounded on three sides by taller houses, enabling the Herati troops to gain advantageous firing positions from which they opened a heavy fire that gradually wiped out the defenders. Cavagnari was the first casualty of the attack, being hit in the head by a musket ball, but he was still able to lead a bayonet charge and drive the Afghans out of the compound, after which he withdrew inside the buildings and died of his wounds.

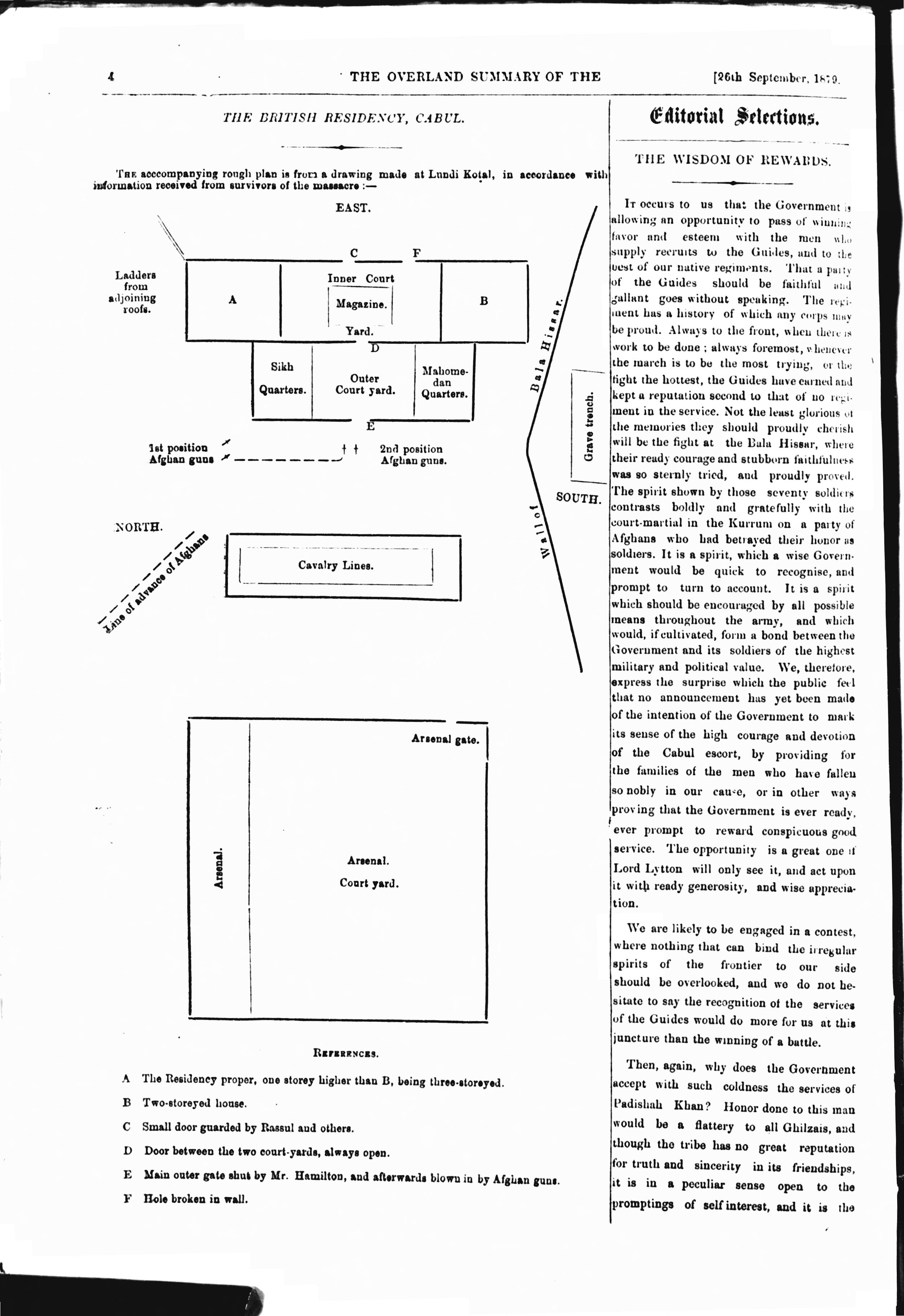
Plan map of the Siege of the British Residency in Kabul (1879), The Indian Daily News, Tuesday 23 September 1879

The defense was taken over by Lieutenant Hamilton, who despatched a second messenger to Yakub Khan. This time the Amir sent his young son and a Mullah to try and pacify the mutineers, but their party was pelted with stones, unhorsed and forced to retreat. By midday, the main building of the Residency was on fire, and only 30 Guides and three British officers were fit enough to keep fighting. A last messenger was dispatched to the Amir, who answered that he was powerless to help.

Eventually, the Afghans brought two cannons to the Residency, and started firing point-blank at the building. Hamilton led his remaining men in a charge that captured one gun, but they were driven back by Afghan fire that killed the surgeon, Kelly, and six sepoys. Hamilton urged his men to charge the guns once more but Jenkyns, Cavagnari's assistant, was killed, and the defenders were driven back. As the main building was on fire and collapsing, Hamilton and the 20 surviving sepoys took refuge in the brick bathhouse of the residency. Hamilton led another charge on the Afghan guns, and this time three sepoys managed to hitch their belts onto one of the gun carriages. After a moment's hesitation, the Herati soldiers charged the small party of Guides. Hamilton faced the oncoming Afghan wave, and emptied his revolver into them before being overwhelmed and killed. His stand allowed his 5 surviving men to retreat inside the compound.

As all the British officers were now dead, the Afghans offered the Moslem soldiers the chance to surrender, but their offer was refused by the Guides, now led by Jemadar Jewand Singh. Instead, the remaining dozen Guides charged out of the compound, where they were all killed, but not before the Jemadar had accounted for 8 Afghans. By early evening, the occupants of the Residency were dead; the siege had lasted 8 hours.

== Aftermath ==
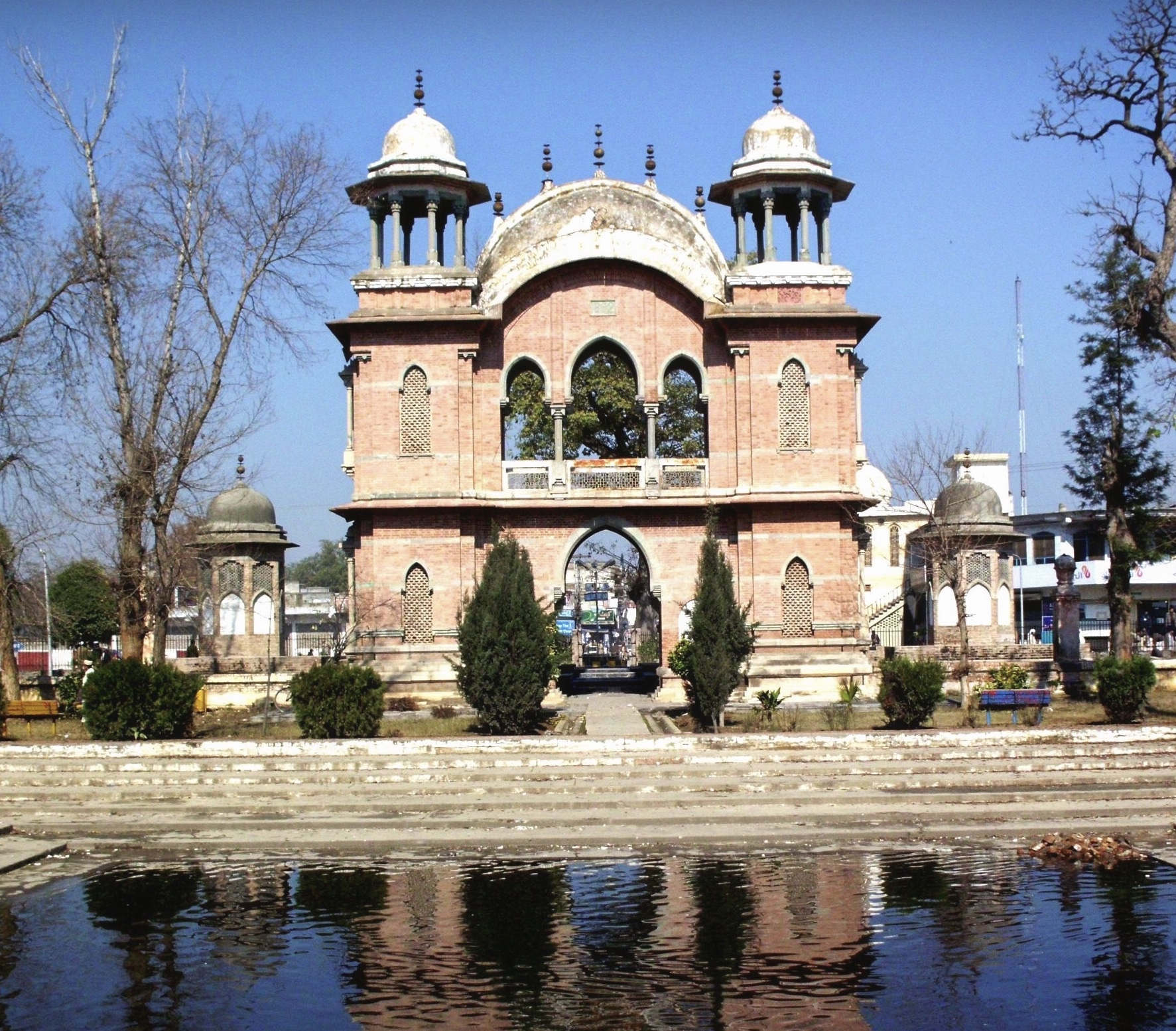
The Guides' Memorial in Mardan, Pakistan, was built in 1892 to honour fallen soldiers who fought during the siege.

From the original force of four British officers and 75 Indian soldiers, only 7 soldiers survived: 4 who were away from the Residency at the time of the attack, and 3 who were sent as messengers to the Amir and detained. A British military commission formed to investigate the events expressed the opinion that "the annals of no army and no regiment can show a brighter record of bravery than has been achieved by this small band of Guides." The entire escort were awarded the Indian Order of Merit (native soldiers at that time were not eligible for the Victoria Cross), and the Corps of Guides was awarded the Battle honour "Residency, Kabul".

The death of Cavagnari and the destruction of the Residency marked a turning point in the Second Anglo-Afghan War. Lytton's aggressive policy towards Afghanistan, known as the "Forward policy", destined to counter a potential Russian threat to British India, had failed spectacularly. Lytton himself observed that his policy had been "shattered to fragments", and instead advocated that Afghanistan should be split into three different states, centered on the cities of Herat, Kandahar and Kabul.

A military force, known as the Kabul Field Force, commanded by Sir Frederick Roberts, was rapidly mobilised in order to punish the perpetrators of Cavagnari's death. Caught between the threat of British retribution, and a xenophobic population, Yakub Khan surrendered to Roberts and later abdicated, declaring that he would rather be a grass-cutter in the English camp than the king of Afghanistan. After a battle at Charasiab, Roberts occupied Kabul on October 12. He set up a special military court that tried and executed some 100 Afghans for participating in the attack on the residency, and for resisting the subsequent British advance on Kabul. This policy proved controversial, both in Britain and India, and embarrassed Lytton and the Disraeli government, which fell during the 1880 general election, in part over the Afghanistan issue.

== In popular culture ==
The siege is portrayed, with some fictionalization, in M.M. Kaye's 1978 novel The Far Pavilions. The novel was adapted into a 1984 mini-series, with Sir John Gielgud as Cavagnari, Benedict Taylor as Hamilton, Adam Bareham as Jenkins and Clive Francis as Kelly.

== Sources ==
- Robson, Brian. (2007). The Road to Kabul: The Second Afghan War 1878–1881. Stroud: Spellmount. ISBN 978-1-86227-416-7.
- Richards, D.S. (1990). The Savage Frontier, A History of the Anglo-Afghan Wars. London: Pan MacMillan. ISBN 0-330-42052-6.
