= Mohammad Yaqub Khan =

Emir of Afghanistan during 1879

Mohammad Yaqub Khan محمد يعقوب خان
- Sardar (Note: Persian: سردار, romanized: Sardār [säɾ.d̪ɑ́ːɾ]); Commander of the Faithful (Note: Arabic: أمير المؤمنين, romanized: ʾAmīr al-Muʾminīn [ʔa.miːr‿ul.muʔ.mi.niːn]); The Sword-Wielding Lion-Slaying Emir (Note: Persian: امیر شیر‌گیر با شمشیر, romanized: Amīr Shēr-gīr bā shamshēr [ʔä.míːɾ ʃeːɾ.gíːɾ bɑː ʃäm.ʃéːɾ])
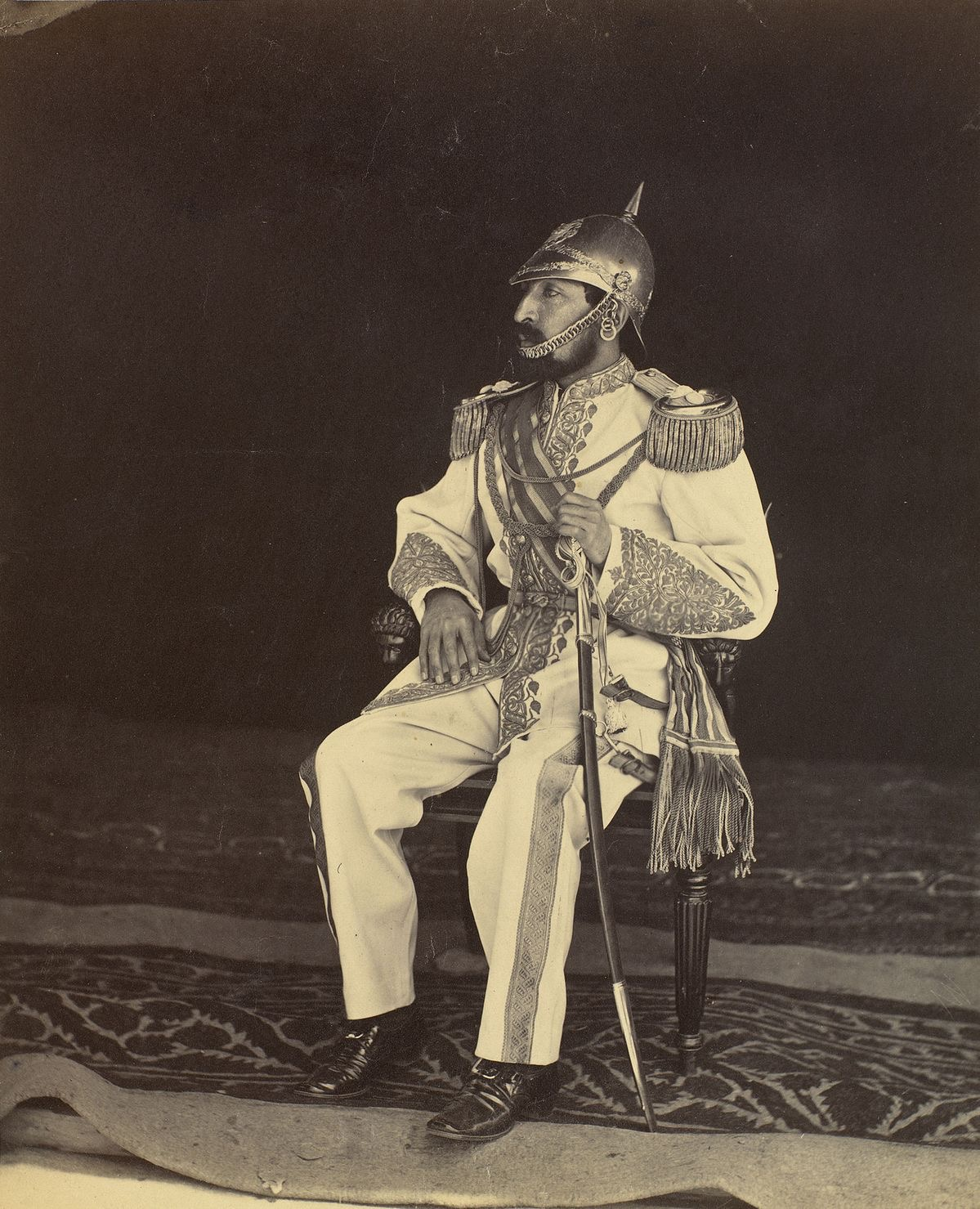
- Portrait by John Burke, 1879

Emir of Afghanistan
- Reign: 21 February 1879 – 12 October 1879
- Coronation: None
- Predecessor: Sher Ali Khan
- Successor: Mohammad Ayub Khan
- Born: 1849; Citadel of Ghazni, Ghazni, Emirate of Kabul
- Died: 15 November 1923 (aged 73–74); Shimla, India
- Spouse: 14 wives: Bibi Siddiqa Begum Bibi Fatima Begum Bibi Ruqaiyah Begum A daughter of Nur Mohammad Khan A daughter of Haji Mohammad Yusuf Khan Ghilji Bibi Gulshan Begum Three unnamed wives A Hazara consort Bibi Gul Badan Bibi Shabho Bibi Maina Bibi Nastaran
- Issue: 16 sons and 13 daughters: Mohammad Musa Khan Mohammad Kazim Khan Mohammad Nabi Khan Mohammad Yunus Khan Abdul Karim Khan Mohammad Hasan Khan Abdul Ali Khan Mohammad Ismail Khan Abdul Karim Khan Abdul Rahim Khan Mohammad Muhsin Khan Mohammad Azim Khan Abdul Rahman Khan Abdullah Khan Abdul Hamid Khan Abdul Qayyum Khan Abdul Wahab Khan Bibi Zubaida Begum Bibi Ruh Afsar Begum Bibi Zainab Begum Bibi Humaira Begum Bibi Hajira Begum Bibi Nur Jahan Begum Bibi Zahra Begum Bibi Hawa Begum Bibi Zainab Begum Bibi Sultanat Begum Bibi Koko Jan Bibi Masuma Begum Bibi Mariam Begum Bibi Shireen Begum
- Dynasty: Barakzai dynasty
- Father: Sher Ali Khan
- Mother: Qamar Jan, a daughter of Sa'adat Khan Mohmand

Mohammad Yaqub Khan Barakzai (Note: Pashto: محمد يعقوب خان بارکزی, romanized: Muhammad Ya'qub Xān Bārakzai [mu.wa.mad̪ jɑ.kub xɑn bɑ.ɾak.zaɪ, mu.ham.mad̪ jɑ.qub xɑn bɑ.ɾak.zaɪ]; Persian: محمد يعقوب خان بارکزی, romanized: Mohammad Ya'qūb Khān Bārakzay [mʊ.wäm.mád̪ jɑː.qúːb xɑːn bɑː.ɾäk.záj, mo̞.ɦäm.mád̪ jäʔ.qúːb xɑːn bɑː.ɾäk.záj]) (1849 – 15 November 1923) was Emir of Afghanistan from 21 February to 12 October 1879. He was a Pashtun and the son of the previous ruler, Sher Ali Khan.

Mohammad Yaqub Khan was appointed as the governor of Herat province in 1863. In 1870, he decided to rebel against his father but failed and was imprisoned in 1874.

The Second Anglo-Afghan War erupted in 1878, leading Sher Ali Khan to flee the capital of Afghanistan, and eventually die in February 1879 in the north of the country. As Sher Ali's successor, Yaqub signed the Treaty of Gandamak with Britain in May 1879, relinquishing sole control of Afghanistan foreign affairs to the British Empire. An uprising against this agreement led by Ayub Khan in October of the same year, led to the abdication of Yaqub Khan. He was succeeded by the new ruler, Amir Ayub Khan.

== Treaty of Gandamak ==
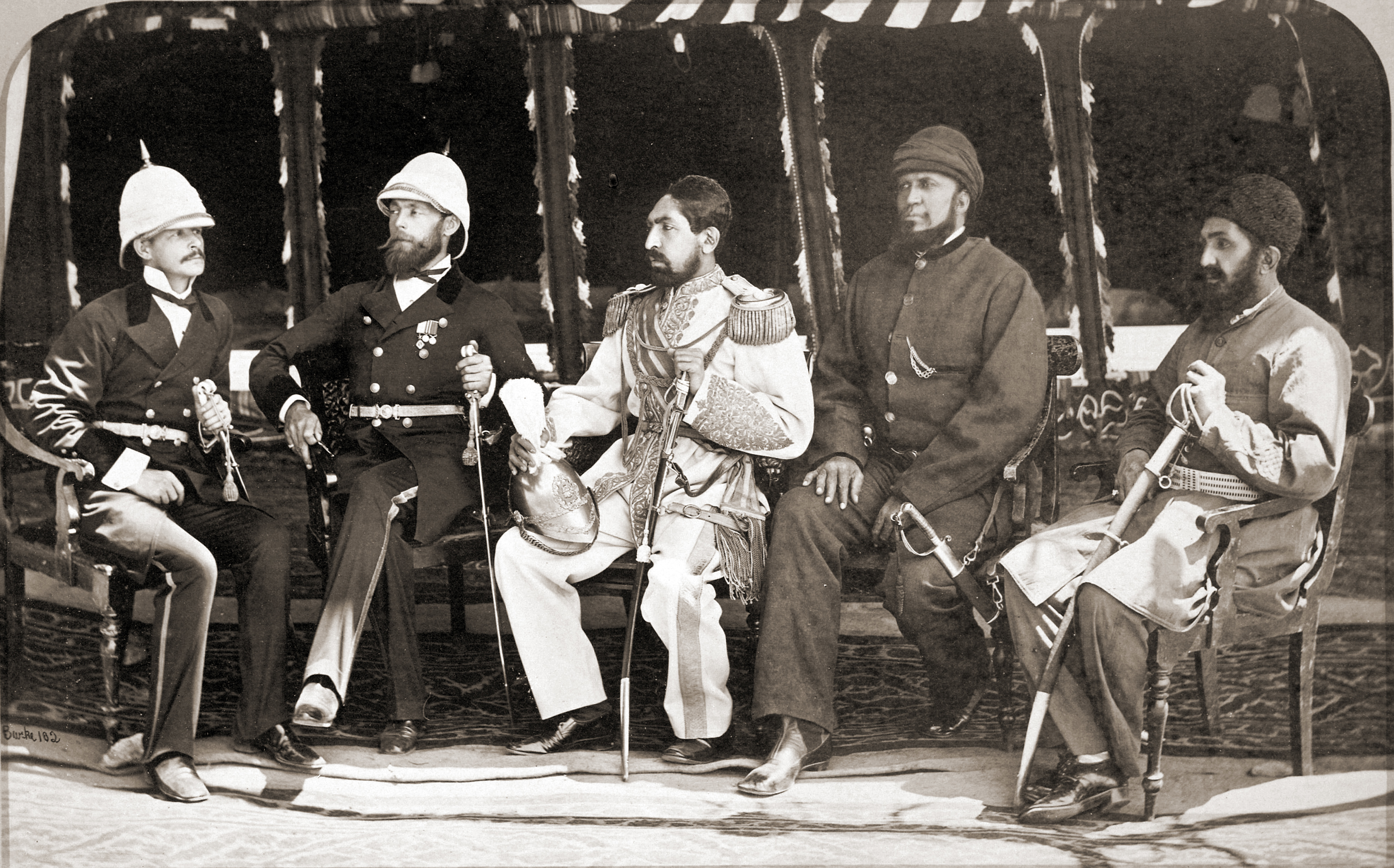
Gandamak, Afghanistan in May 1879. Seated from left to right: British officers Mr. Jenkyns and Major Cavagnari, Amir Yakub Khan (in the centre), General Daoud Shah and Habibullah Mustafi.

During the Second Anglo-Afghan War, the British defeated the Amir Sher Ali's forces, wintered in Jalalabad, waiting for the new Amir Yakub Khan to accept their terms and conditions. One of the key figures in the negotiations was Pierre Louis Napoleon Cavagnari, who served with the East India Army in the 1st Bengal Fusiliers and then transferred into political service, becoming Deputy Commissioner at Peshawar, and was appointed as envoy by the Viceroy Lord Lytton in the 1878 mission to Kabul which the Afghans refused to let proceed. This refusal was one of a series of events which led to the Second Afghan War.

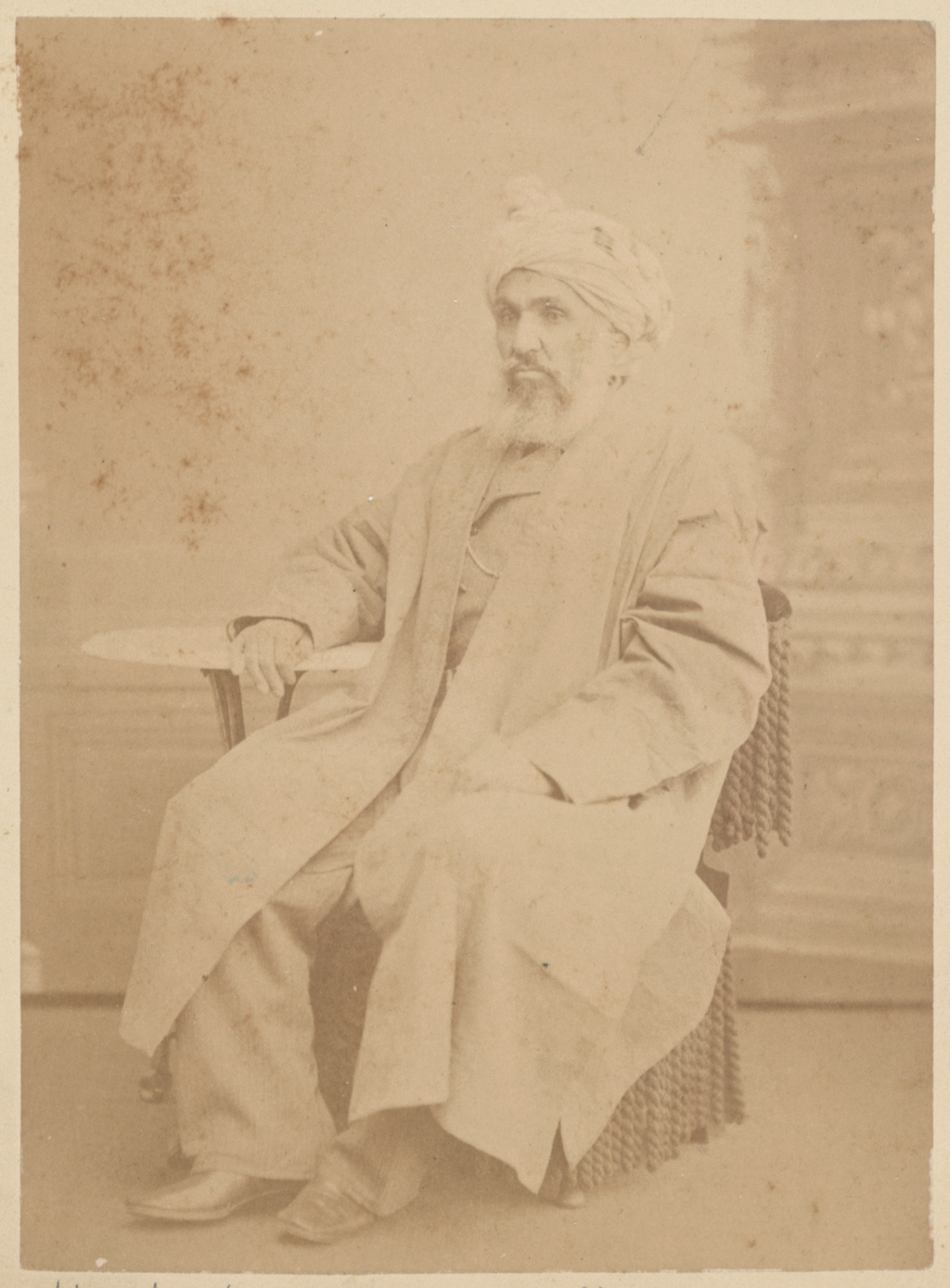
Amir Yakub Khan's Mustanfi Habibullah Khan

In May 1879, Yakub Khan travelled to Gandamak, a village just outside Jalalabad and entered into negotiations with Cavagnari as a result of which the Treaty of Gandamak was signed whereby the Amir ceded territories to the British and accepted a British envoy in Kabul. Cavagnari took up the post of British Resident in Kabul in July 1879. He was known to be reckless and arrogant rather than discreet and his role as envoy was viewed as injudicious even by some of the British. The situation in Kabul was tense and eventually some Afghan troops who had not been paid by the Amir rebelled and attacked the Residency, killing Cavagnari and his mission in September 1879. The war was far from over despite the treaty and British troops were recalled over the mountains to occupy Kabul, secure it and launch punitive action against the Afghans. Yakub Khan abdicated, taking refuge in the British camp and was subsequently sent to India in December.

== In popular culture ==
Mohammed Yaqub Khan appears in M.M. Kaye's 1978 novel The Far Pavilions. The novel was adapted by a 1984 mini-series, in which Atul Tandon portrayed Khan.

== Notable Quotes ==
I would rather work as your servant, cut grass and tend your garden than be the ruler of Afghanistan. – Yaqub Khan, to a British viceroy in the 19th century.

== See also ==
- List of leaders of Afghanistan

== Notes ==
Regnal titles
Preceded by Sher Ali Khan	Barakzai dynasty Emir of Afghanistan; 1879	Succeeded by Ayub Khan
