= Thomas Rice Henn (British Army officer) =

Irish officer in the British Army

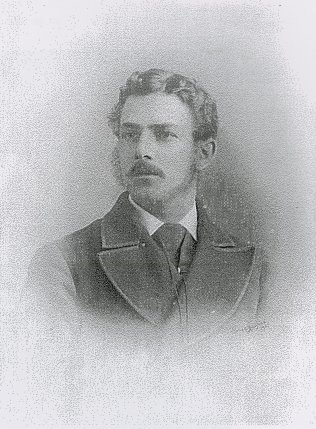
- Born: 2 November 1849; Dublin, Ireland
- Died: 27 July 1880 (aged 30); Maiwand, Afghanistan
- Military career
- Allegiance: United Kingdom
- Branch: British Army: Royal Engineers
- Service years: 1869–1880
- Rank: Lieutenant
- Conflicts: Second Anglo-Afghan War; Battle of Maiwand †

Lieutenant Thomas Rice Henn (1849–1880) of the Royal Engineers was an Irish officer in the British Army. He was killed in action near the end of the Battle of Maiwand while covering the retreat of routed British forces.

== Life ==
=== Early life ===
Thomas Rice Henn was the third son of Thomas Rice Henn of Paradise Hill, County Clare, Esquire, JP, DL, Recorder of Galway, by Jane Isabella, his wife, the second daughter of Francis Blackburne, Lord Chancellor of Ireland. He was born in Dublin on 2 November 1849. He was educated at Windermere College, and entered the Royal Military Academy, Woolwich, second in the list of successful candidates, at the early age of seventeen.

=== India and Afghanistan ===
On 7 July 1869 Henn obtained a commission in the Royal Engineers, and after the usual course of study at Chatham was sent to India. He was posted to the Bombay Sappers and Miners at Kirkee, the second company of which he commanded in the Afghan War of 1880. He was present in the Bolan Pass, and also at Kandahar, when he was appointed brigade major of Royal Engineers.

==== Battle of Maiwand ====
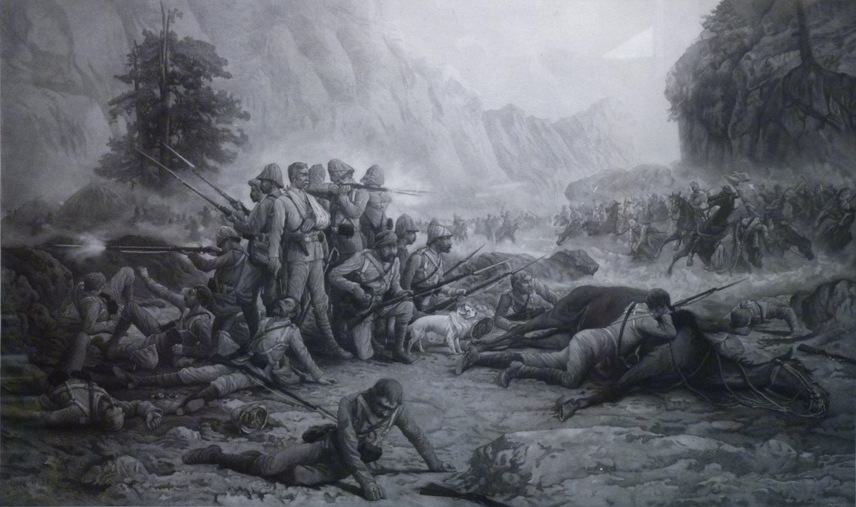
The Last Eleven at Maiwand by Frank Feller (c. 1884)

In July 1880 Henn took part in the advance of the brigade under General Burrows to the Helmund, and was killed in the disastrous Battle of Maiwand. When the battle became a rout Henn and his sappers were alongside the battery of Horse Artillery. Its commander, Major Blackwood, had been mortally wounded, and Captain Slade, who succeeded him, ordered the battery to limber up and retire.

Henn, already wounded in the arm, successfully covered the operation with his handful of men, firing volleys upon the crowd of Ghazis pouring down upon them. Henn then fell steadily back, carrying the wounded Blackwood, and following the line of retreat of the 66th Regiment across the nullah to a garden on the other side. Behind the wall of the garden Henn and the remnant of his company of sappers, supported by a party of the 66th and some native grenadiers, took up their stand. There they held the enemy at bay, fighting till every man was killed to cover the retreat of their comrades. Around the spot were afterwards found, lightly buried, the bodies of Henn and fourteen sappers, forty-six men of the 66th Regiment, and twenty-three native grenadiers.

== Memorials ==
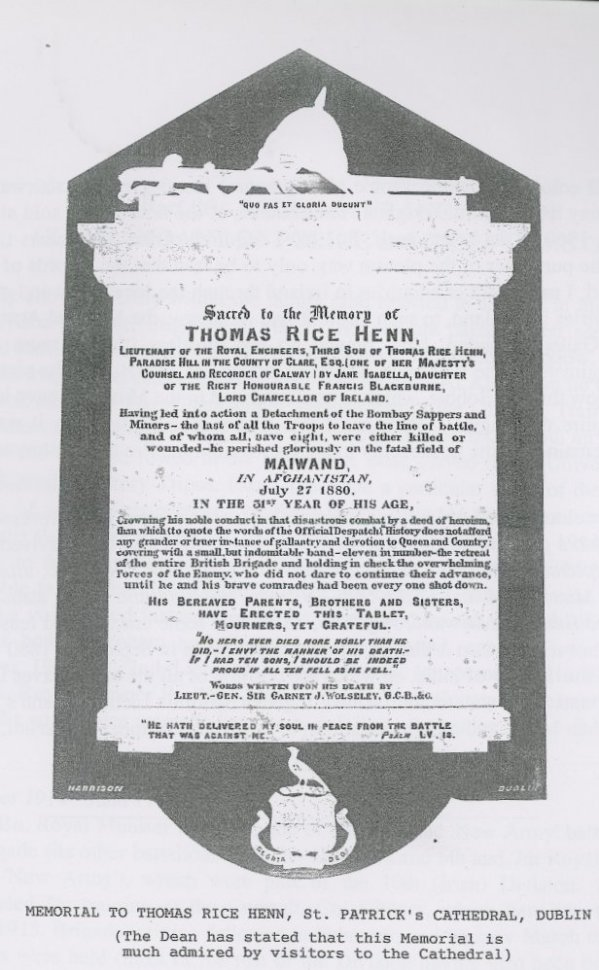
Memorial plaque in St. Patrick's Cathedral, Dublin

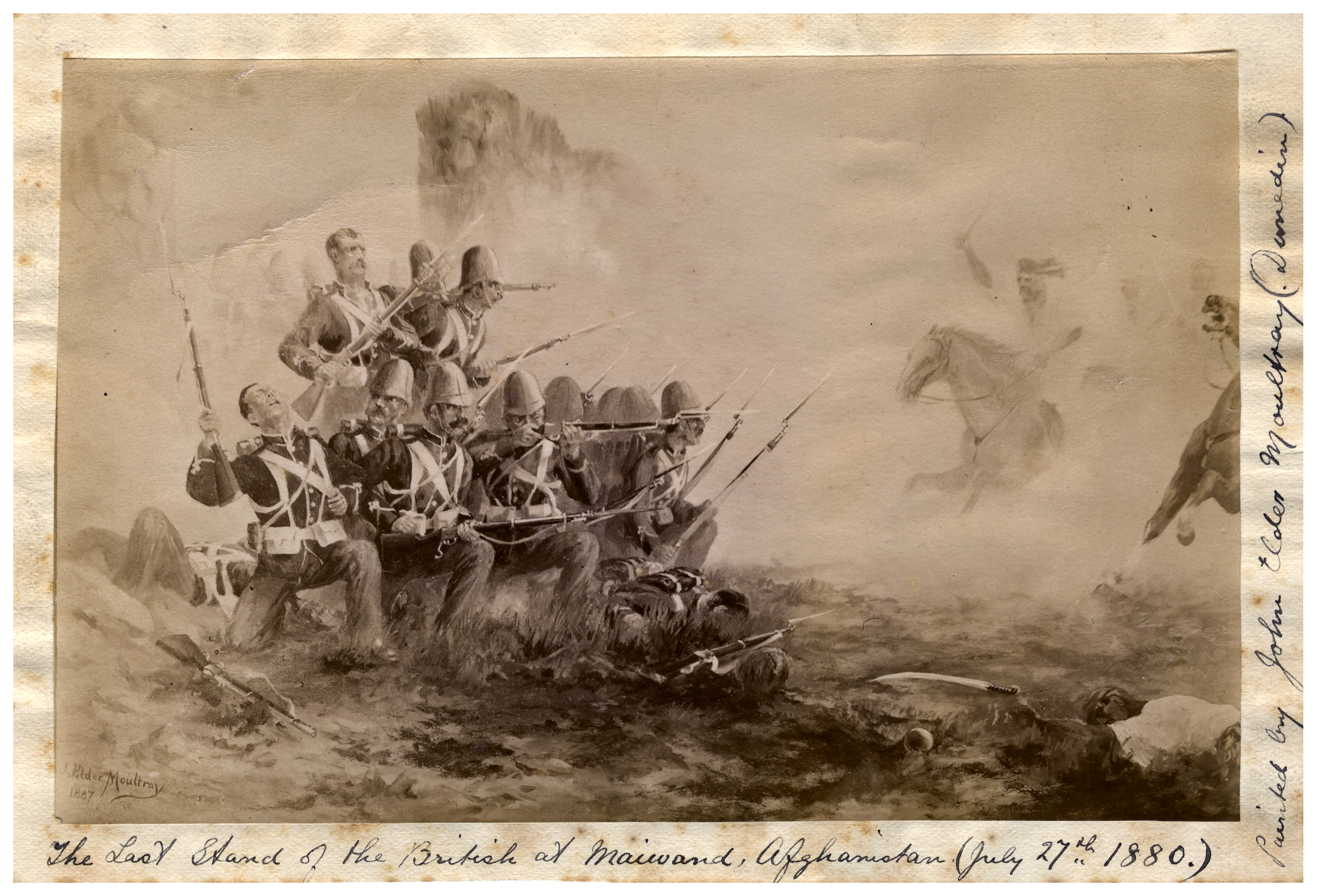
John Moultray: The Last Stand of the British at Maiwand, Afghanistan, 27 July 1880 (c. 1887)

In General Primrose's despatch of 1 October 1880 he describes, on the authority of an eye-witness—an artillery colonel of Ayub Khan's army—the gallant stand made by this little party.

Henn was unmarried. A stained-glass window in his memory was placed in Rochester Cathedral by the Corps of Royal Engineers, and a memorial tablet was also placed in St. Patrick's Cathedral, Dublin.

== Arms ==
Coat of arms of Thomas Rice Henn
Notes Granted 28 November 1856 by Sir John Bernard Burke, Ulster King of Arms. Crest On a mount Vert a hen-pheasant Proper. Escutcheon Gules a lion rampant Argent on a canton of the last a wolf passant Sable langued of the first. Motto Gloria Deo

== Bibliography ==
- Boase, Frederic (1892). "Henn, Thomas Rice". In Modern English Biography. Vol. 1: A–H. Truro: Netherton and Worth. p. 1429.
- Hanna, H. B. (1910). The Second Afghan War 1878–79–80: Its Causes, Its Conduct, and Its Consequences. Vol. 3. London: Constable & Co. Ltd. pp. 409, 417.
- Robson, Brian (1986). The Road to Kabul: The Second Afghan War 1878–1881. Arms and Armour Press. pp. 232, 262.
- Sandes, E. W. C. (1933). The Military Engineer in India. Vol. 1. Chatham: Institution of Royal Engineers. pp. 389–390.
- Sandes, E. W. C. (1948). The Indian Sappers and Miners. Chatham: Institution of Royal Engineers. pp. 267–280.
- Shadbolt, Sydney H. (1882). The Afghan Campaigns of 1878–1880. Vol. 1: Biographical Division. London: Sampson Low, Marston Searle, and Rivington. pp. 107–109.
- Stacpoole-Ryding, Richard J.; Chaloner, Andy (2008). Maiwand: The Last Stand of the 66th (Berkshire) Regiment in Afghanistan, 1880. History Press.
- Vetch, Robert Hamilton (1891). "Henn, Thomas Rice" . In Stephen, Leslie; Lee, Sidney (eds.). Dictionary of National Biography. Vol. 25. London: Smith, Elder & Co. p. 422.
- Vetch, R. H.; Stearn, Roger T. (2011). "Henn, Thomas Rice (1849–1880), army officer". In Oxford Dictionary of National Biography. Oxford University Press.
- "General Order. Military Department. Simla, the 27th September, 1880". The London Gazette. No. 24903. 19 November 1880. pp. 5799–5824.
- "Officers Killed at Maiwand". The Illustrated London News. No. 2163. Vol. LXXVII. 13 November 1880. p. 468.
