= George Frederick Blackwood =

British army officer

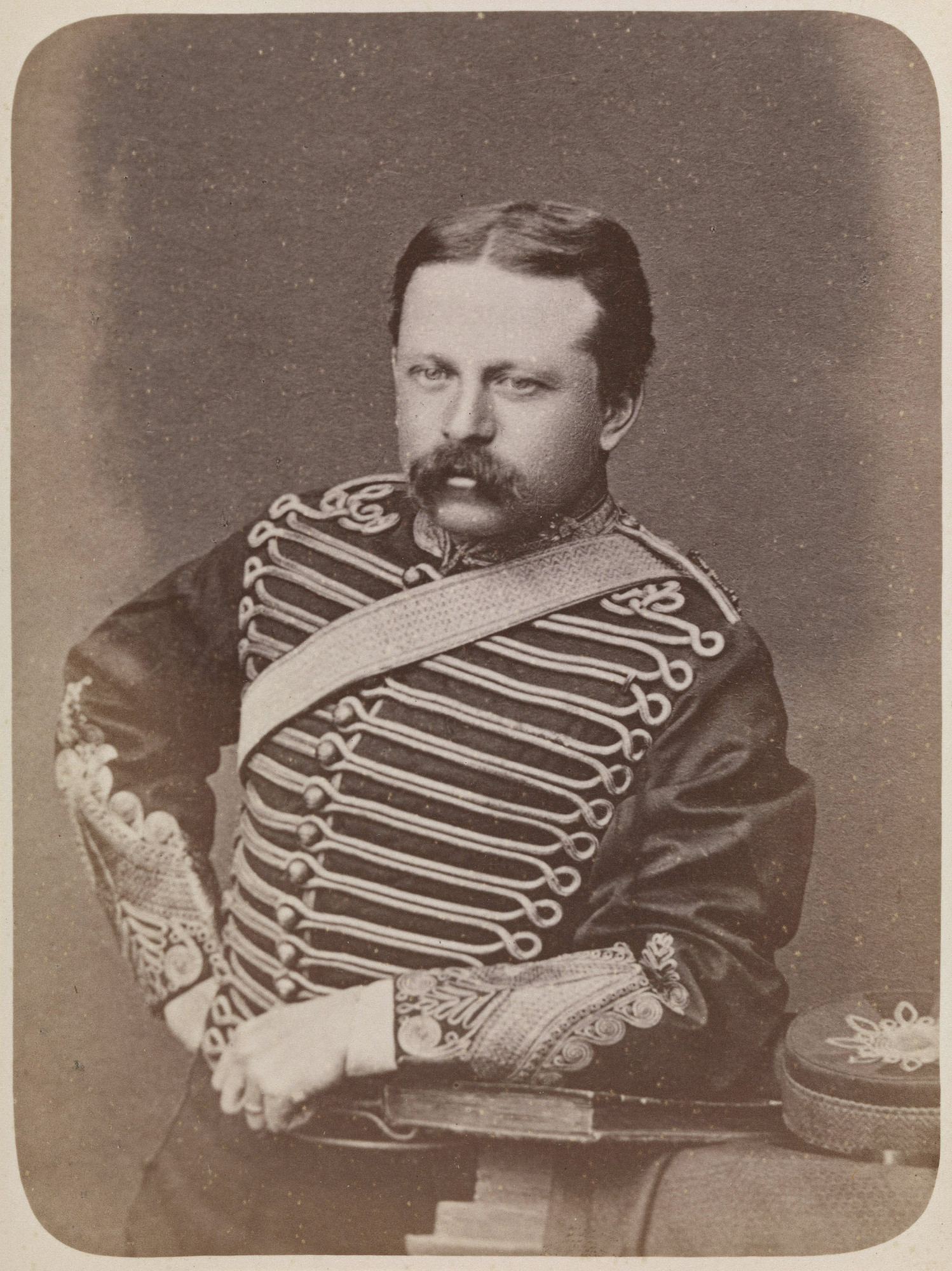
- Half-length photographic portrait (c. 1879)
- Born: 11 August 1838; Moradabad, Bengal
- Died: 27 July 1880 (aged 41); Maiwand, Afghanistan
- Military career
- Allegiance: United Kingdom
- Branch: Bengal Army; Indian Army
- Service years: 1857–1880
- Rank: Major
- Commands: E Battery RHA
- Conflicts: Indian Mutiny; Looshai Expedition; Second Afghan War; Battle of Maiwand †

Major George Frederick Blackwood (1838–1880) of the Royal Horse Artillery was a Scottish artillery officer in the service of the East India Company and the Raj. He was killed in action at the Battle of Maiwand, a major British defeat.

== Life ==
=== Early life ===
George Frederick Blackwood was born at Moradabad, Bengal, on 11 August 1838, the second son of Major William Blackwood, of the Bengal Army, and his wife, Emma Moore (1811–1881). He was a grandson of William Blackwood, the founder of the publishing firm. He was educated at the Edinburgh Academy and at Addiscombe College, and was gazetted a second lieutenant in the Bengal Artillery on 11 December 1857.

=== The Raj ===
Blackwood arrived in India in the midst of the Indian Mutiny, and was at once appointed to command two guns in Colonel Wilkinson's Rohilcund movable column. He was promoted to first lieutenant on 27 August 1858, and filled the post of adjutant first to the Bareilly and Gwalior divisions, and then to the twenty-second and nineteenth brigades of Royal Artillery from 1859 to 1864.

He was promoted to captain on 20 February 1867, and in 1872 was appointed to command the artillery attached to General Bourchier's column in the Looshai Expedition. In that capacity he was present at the attacks on Tipar-Mukh, Küng-Nüng and Taikooui, and he gave such satisfaction that his services were specially mentioned in the general's despatch of 19 March 1872, and he was promoted to major by brevet on 11 September following.

He gave further evidence of his ability as an artillery officer by his very able report on the use of guns in such country as that in which he had been recently engaged, with hints on the calibre best suited for mountain guns, which was printed by the Indian Government and circulated by it among its officers.

=== Afghanistan ===
Blackwood was promoted to major on 10 February 1875, and after temporarily commanding a battery of Royal Horse Artillery came to England on sick leave. He thus missed the first Afghan campaign of 1878–79, but was in India when on the news of Cavagnari's death the British determined to once more occupy both Cabul and Candahar.

Blackwood was posted to the command of the E Battery B Brigade of Royal Horse Artillery, and ordered to join the force destined for Candahar. While stationed there the news arrived of the advance of Ayoub Khan, and a column was ordered out under the command of Brigadier-general Burrows to assist the wali placed in command by Abdur-rahman Khan, and to investigate the strength of the enemy. To that column Blackwood's battery was attached; the column was destroyed in the Battle of Maiwand on 27 July 1880, where Blackwood was killed and buried in the field, and two of his guns lost. They were later recovered after Ayub's defeat on 1 September 1880, and were presented to Frederick Roberts by the government.

== Bibliography ==
- Boase, Frederic (1892). "Blackwood, George Frederick". In Modern English Biography. Vol. 1: A–H. Truro: Netherton and Worth. p. 300.
- Buckland, Charles Edward (1906). "Blackwood, George Frederick (1838–1880)". In Dictionary of Indian Biography. London: Swan Sonnenschein & Co., Ltd. p. 44.
- Hanna, Henry Bathurst (1910). The Second Afghan War 1878–79–80: Its Causes, Its Conduct, and Its Consequences. Vol. 3. London: Constable & Co. Ltd. pp. 390–392, 406–408.
- Roberts, Frederick Sleigh (1897). Forty-one Years in India: from Subaltern to Commander-in-chief. Vol. 2. London: Richard Bentley and Son. p. 65.
- Robson, Brian (1986). The Road to Kabul: The Second Afghan War 1878–1881. Arms and Armour Press. pp. 231, 239.
- Shadbolt, Sydney H. (1882). The Afghan Campaigns of 1878–1880. Vol. 1: Biographical Division. London: Sampson Low, Marston Searle, and Rivington. pp. 20–22, 108–109, 156.
- Stacpoole-Ryding, Richard J.; Chaloner, Andy (2008). Maiwand: The Last Stand of the 66th (Berkshire) Regiment in Afghanistan, 1880. History Press.
- Stephens, H. M.; Lunt, James (2020). "Blackwood, George Frederick (1838–1880), army officer". In Oxford Dictionary of National Biography. Oxford University Press.
- Stephens, Henry Morse (1886). "Blackwood, George Frederick" . In Stephen, Leslie (ed.). Dictionary of National Biography. Vol. 5. London: Smith, Elder & Co. p. 150.
- "General Order. Military Department. Simla, the 27th September, 1880". The London Gazette. No. 24903. 19 November 1880. pp. 5799–5824.
- "Obituary". The Times. 2 October 1880. p. 8. Gale. Retrieved 6 May 2022.
- "Officers Killed at Maiwand". The Illustrated London News. No. 2163. Vol. LXXVII. 13 November 1880. p. 468.
