= Henry Francis Brooke =

Irish officer in the British Army (1836–1880)

Brigadier-General Henry Francis Brooke
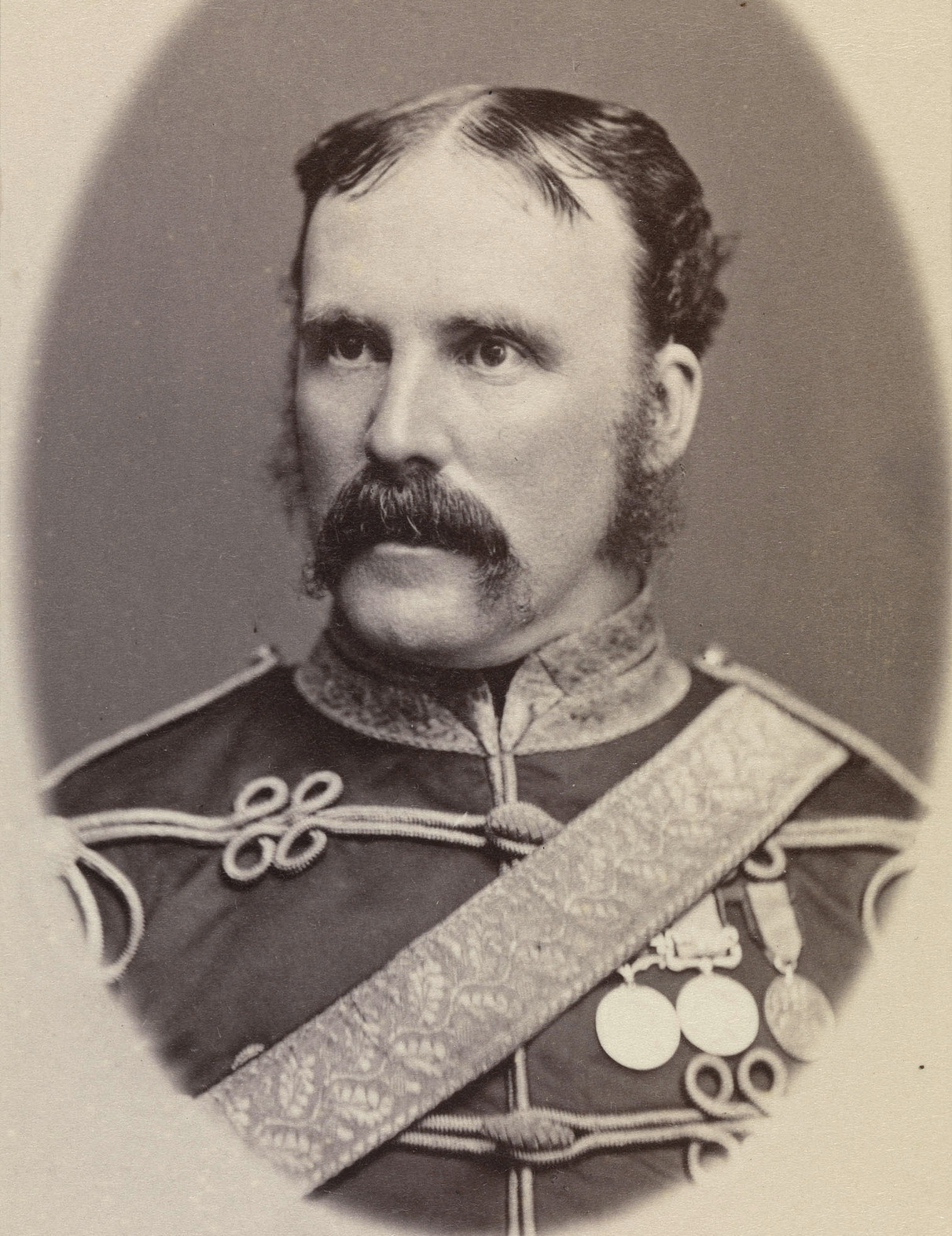
- Photographic portrait in dress uniform (c. 1879)
- Born: 3 August 1836; Ireland
- Died: 16 August 1880 (aged 44); Deh Khwaja, Afghanistan
- Military career
- Allegiance: United Kingdom
- Branch: British Army
- Service years: 1854–1880
- Rank: Brigadier-General
- Commands: 2nd Infantry Brigade, Kandahar Field Force
- Conflicts: Crimean War; Siege of Sebastopol; Second Opium War; Third Battle of Taku Forts (WIA); Second Anglo-Afghan War †

Brigadier-General Henry Francis Brooke (1838– 16 August 1880), commanding the 2nd Infantry Brigade, Kandahar Field Force, was an Irish officer in the British Army. He was killed in a sortie from Kandahar, while trying to save the life of a fellow officer.

== Life ==
=== Origins ===
Henry Francis Brooke was the eldest son of George and Lady Arabella (née Hastings) Brooke, of Ashbrooke, County Fermanagh. He was born on 3 August 1836. At the age of eighteen years he was gazetted, in June 1854, to an ensigncy in the 48th Foot.

=== The Crimea ===
Landing with the 48th Regiment in the Crimea on 21 April 1855, Brooke served with it in the siege and fall of Sebastopol, earning the Crimea Medal with clasp and the Turkish Medal.

=== China ===
Throughout the campaign of 1860 in China, Brooke acted as Aide-de-Camp to Sir Robert Napier, being present in that capacity at the action of Tangku, the assault of the Taku Forts—in which he was severely wounded—and the final advance on and surrender of Pekin. For his services on these occasions, he received the brevet of Major and the Second China War Medal with two clasps.

=== Staff appointments ===
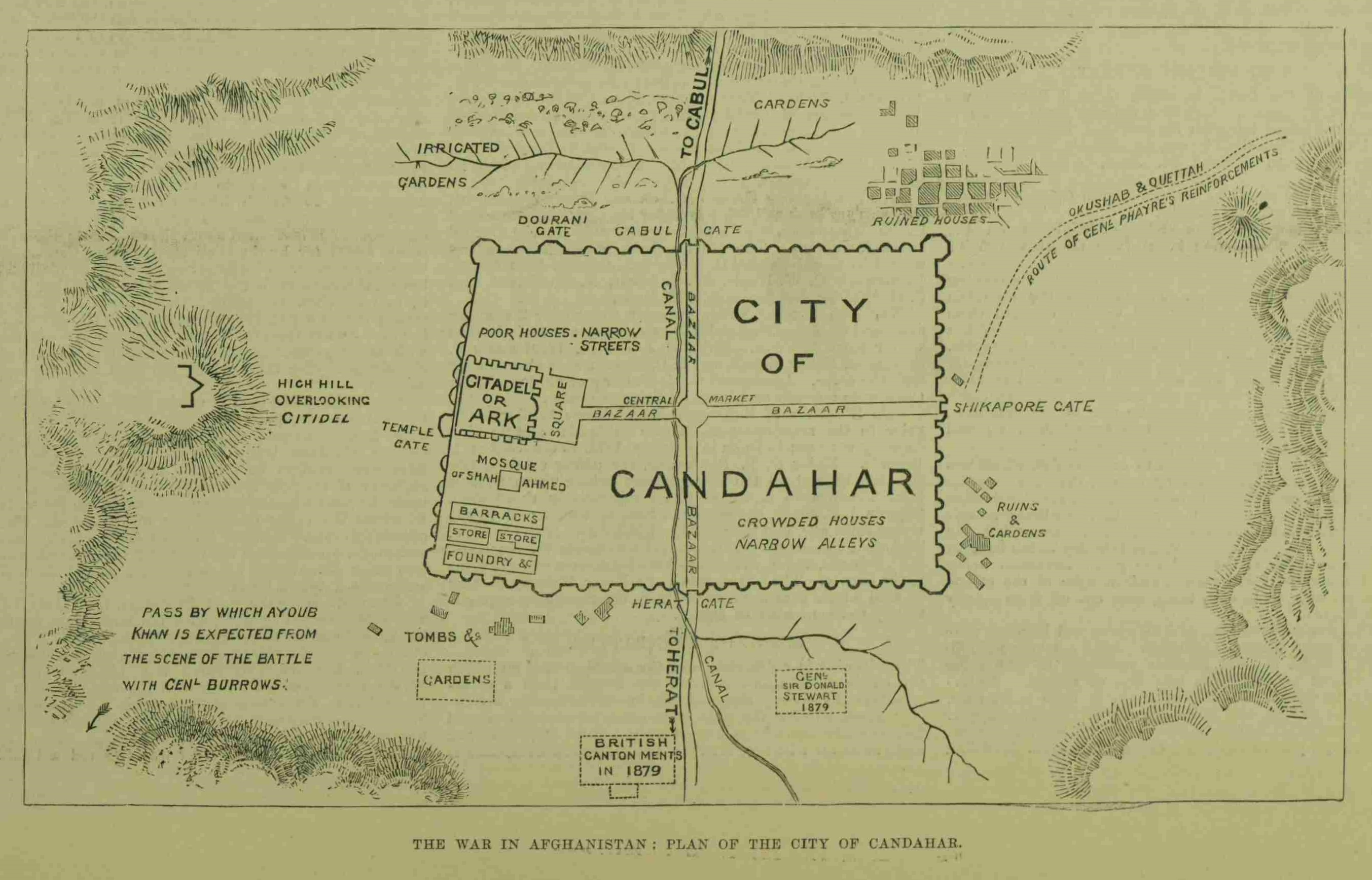
"The War in Afghanistan: Plan of the City of Candahar" from The Illustrated London News (7 August 1880)

In addition to the post of Aide-de-Camp to Sir Robert Napier in China, General Brooke held, in the course of his career, the following staff appointments:

- Brigade Major, Bengal, from 14 April 1863 to 3 January 1865;
- Assistant Adjutant-General, from 3 January 1865 to 23 April 1866, and again from 31 July 1872 to 18 January 1876;
- Deputy Adjutant-General, Bengal, 19 January 1876 to 15 November 1877;
- Adjutant-General (local Brigadier-General), Bombay, 23 November 1877 to 28 March 1880;
- Brigadier-General, Commanding 2nd Infantry Brigade, Kandahar, 28 March 1880 till the day of his death.

In order to assume command of a brigade on active service, he gave up temporarily the better paid and more comfortable, though responsible position, of Adjutant-General of the Bombay Army.

=== Afghanistan ===
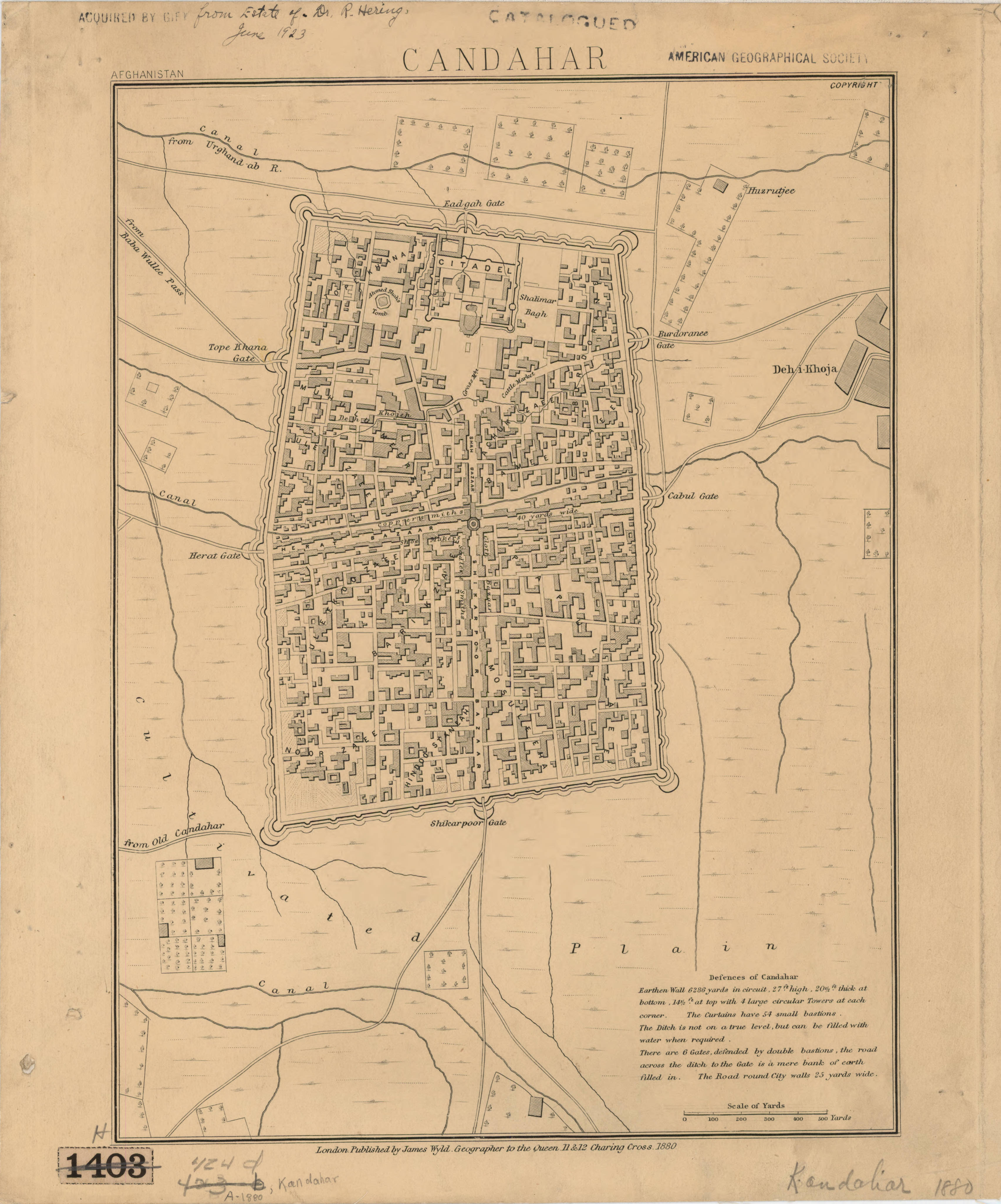
James Wyld's map of the fortified city of Candahar (1880)

General Brooke arrived at Kandahar at 10am on 22 April 1880, and at once assumed the command of the garrison, which, up to the date of his arrival, had been held—in addition to the chief command of the forces in Southern Afghanistan—by General Primrose. He made an inspection of the limits of his command and troops, and placed on record his sense of the very imperfect condition of the fortifications, pointing out the obvious necessity for some defensive works being created. These representations were re-submitted, on his arrival shortly afterwards, by General Burrows. It was considered by the authorities inadvisable to incur the considerable charges required to upgrade the defenses.

The approach of Ayub Khan's army caused disturbance amongst the local population. General Brooke and Major Adam were fired upon on 16 July in the Morcha Pass by a party among the rocks above them. No trace of the would-be assassins was found. The shots killed one of the sowar's horses.

Then the news of Maiwand was brought in. At Brooke's request a small detachment of all arms was sent out under his command to cover the last few miles of the retreat.

On General Brooke's return to the city at about 2 pm, after an absence of some seven hours, it was discovered that the orders for the withdrawal of the outlying corps, which it had been found necessary to issue, had been misunderstood. Instead of having packed up everything, and brought it into the central enclosure, preparatory to the retirement to the city, most of the troops in the cantonments had withdrawn at once, leaving their baggage and camp equipage in their quarters, where it had been looted by the villagers. Portions of it were subsequently recovered by detachments sent out for the purpose. By nightfall all the troops were withdrawn into the city, in an orderly manner, under General Brooke's directions.

==== Death ====
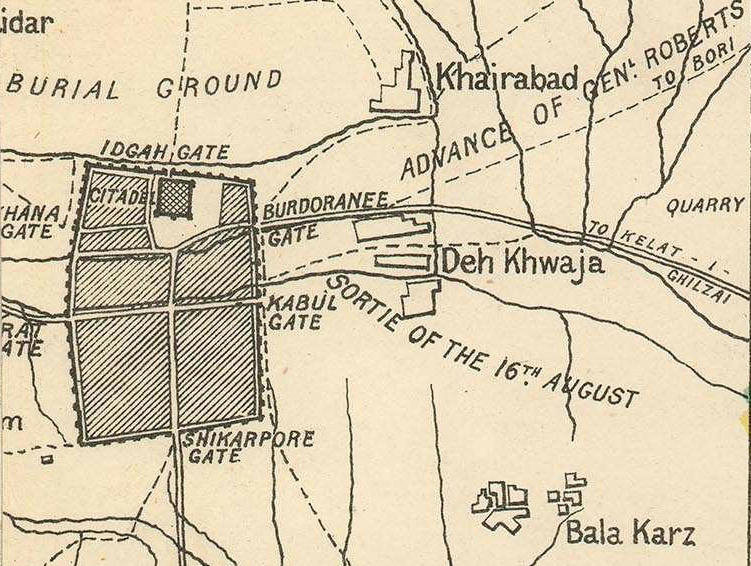
Edward Stanford's Map of the Seat of War in Afghanistan in 1880 (detail, showing Kandahar and Deh Khwaja)

On 16 August, the sortie of that day, to the village of Deh Khwaja, was undertaken in opposition both to his own advice and to that of General Burrows. On the evening of 15 August, General Brooke was told that the operation was to be carried out, and that he was to have the command. He was emphatic in expressing his disapproval of the project; he stated, "It will either be a walk over, or a very serious business. In the former case, it will be useless as a demonstration; in the latter, it must entail heavy loss."

After the two attacking columns had forced their way under a heavy fire through the southern portion of the village, General Brooke returned almost alone to assist Captain Cruickshank, of the Royal Engineers, and a party who were escorting him, to the walls. Attended by his mounted trumpeter (Mr. Glynn, of Battery C/2, Royal Artillery, who remained with him till he fell, and reached Kandahar unwounded), and assisted by a sergeant of the 7th Fusiliers, he succeeded in reaching Captain Cruickshank and began to carry him towards the Kabul gate. He died during this attempt.

== Honours ==
- Crimea Medal with clasp
- Turkish Crimea Medal
- Second China War Medal with two clasps
- Afghanistan Medal (posthumous)

== Bibliography ==
- Boase, Frederic (1892). "Brooke, Henry Francis". In Modern English Biography. Vol. 1: A–H. Truro: Netherton and Worth. p. 416.
- Brooke, Annie, ed. (1881). Private Journal of Henry Francis Brooke … from April 22nd to August 16th, 1880. Dublin: William Curwen.
- Hanna, Henry Bathurst (1910). The Second Afghan War 1878–79–80: Its Causes, Its Conduct, and Its Consequences. Vol. 3. London: Constable & Co. Ltd. pp. 424–461.
- Roberts, Frederick Sleigh (1897). Forty-one Years in India: from Subaltern to Commander-in-chief. Vol. 2. London: Richard Bentley and Son. p. 351
- Robson, Brian (1986). The Road to Kabul: The Second Afghan War 1878–1881. Arms and Armour Press. pp. 239, 246, 255.
- Shadbolt, Sydney H. (1882). The Afghan Campaigns of 1878–1880. Vol. 1: Biographical Division. London: Sampson Low, Marston Searle, and Rivington. pp. 24–26, 61, 66, 138, 237.
- "General Order. Military Department. Simla, the 27th September, 1880". The London Gazette. No. 24903. 19 November 1880. pp. 5799–5824.
- "The Late Brigadier-General H. F. Brooke". The Illustrated London News. No. 2155. Vol. LXXVII. 18 September 1880. p. 289.
