= Bobbie (dog) =

British regimental mascot dog

Bobbie was the name of a British regimental mascot dog, a mongrel from Reading, who accompanied his regiment to Afghanistan and became involved in the Battle of Maiwand. He survived, and upon his return to England he and several of his human colleagues were presented to Queen Victoria and received honours.

== Life ==
Bobbie belonged to Lance-Sergeant Peter Kelly of the 66th Regiment of Foot (the Berkshire Regiment). He was initially stationed at Brock Barracks, then went overseas with the regiment in the late 1870s.

In 1880 the regiment was stationed at the fort in Kandahar, Afghanistan, which had been occupied by the British since January 1879, just after the start of the Second Anglo-Afghan War.

On 3 July 1880, a column of about 2,700 troops under Brigadier George Burrows set out from Kandahar to assist friendly tribesmen in putting down a rebellion by Ayub Khan. Bobbie accompanied the troops. For ten days, Burrows searched for the rebel force. Meanwhile, the friendly tribesmen turned out not to be so friendly, leaving Burrows' force to face an ever-increasing rebel army in countryside where every man's hand was ready to turn against them.

Eventually, the British force was surrounded and attacked by a much larger Afghan force. Along with a line of Indian regiments and cavalry, the 66th Foot made a stand while the guns were evacuated. Bobbie was reported to have barked furiously at the attackers. The British were overrun; over half of the 66th Regiment was wiped out, and the survivors were forced to retreat to Kandahar.

Bobbie got lost in the confusion, but the following day, British survivors making their way back to the fort spotted a wounded Bobbie trying to catch up with them. He was reunited with his owner, who had also been wounded.

Upon arrival back in England, Bobbie was presented to Queen Victoria alongside several soldiers of the regiment. The soldiers received Distinguished Conduct Medals, while Bobbie was awarded his own Afghanistan Medal.

In 1882–just a year later–Bobbie was accidentally run over and killed by a hansom cab in Gosport, Hampshire. He was stuffed and can be seen today at The Rifles Berkshire and Wiltshire Museum in Salisbury. He was loaned to Reading Museum for a World War One exhibition.

== Memorials ==
As well as the display in the Regimental Museum at Salisbury, Bobbie is featured on a commemorative coin given to those who attended the 2004 opening of the Animals in War Memorial in Hyde Park in London.
