= Afghanistan Medal (United Kingdom) =

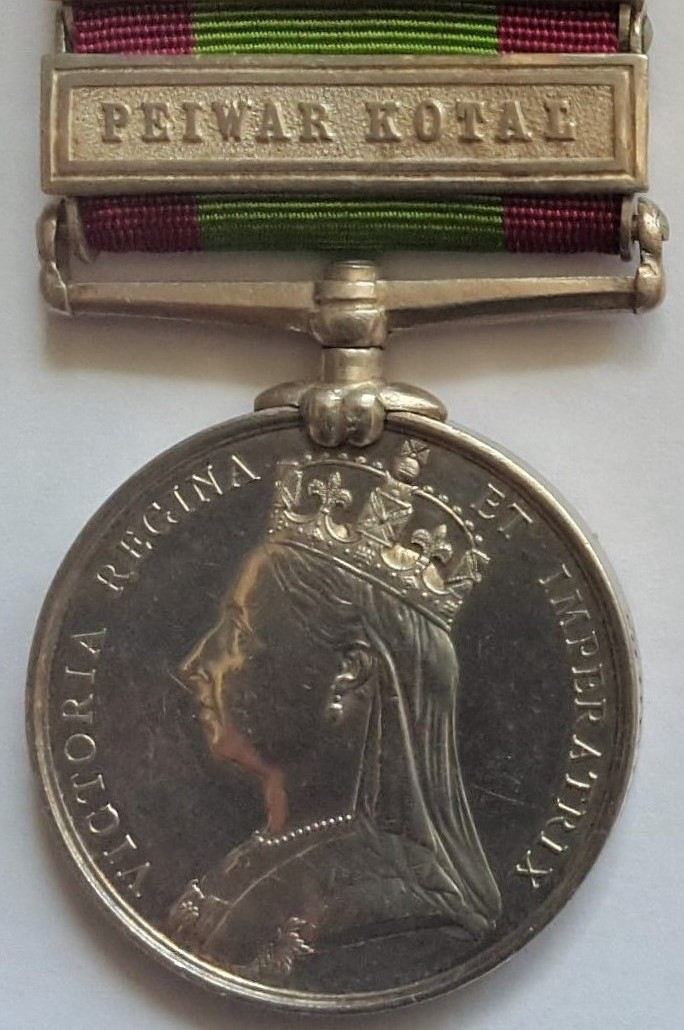
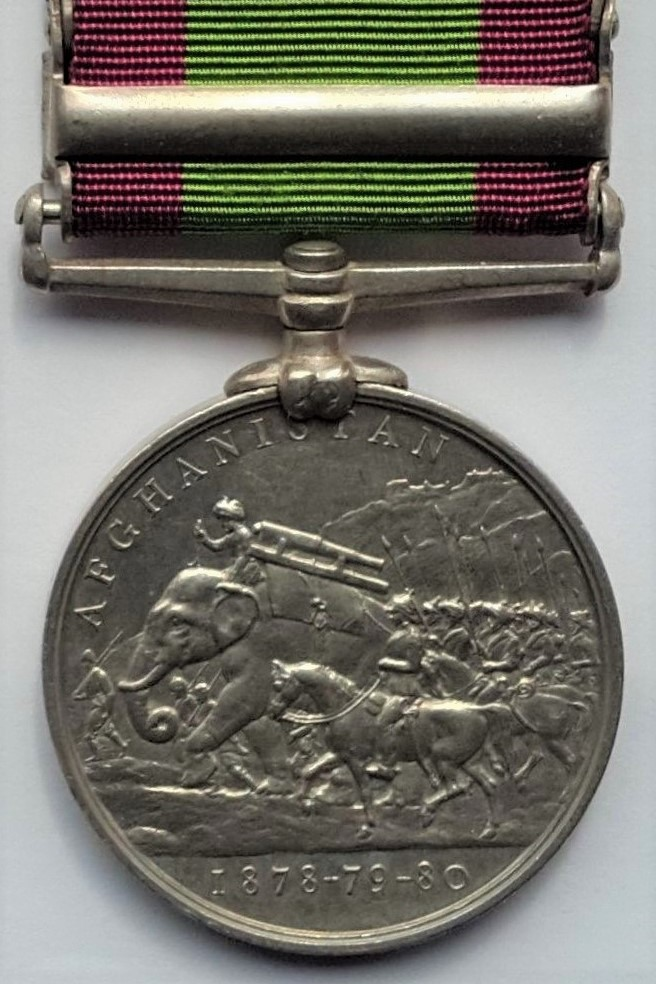
- Obverse and reverse of the medal.
- Type: Campaign medal
- Awarded for: Campaign service.
- Description: Silver disk, 36mm diameter.
- Presented by: United Kingdom of Great Britain and Ireland
- Eligibility: British and Indian forces.
- Campaign: Afghanistan 1878–1880.
- Clasps: Ali Musjid; Peiwar Kotal; Charasia; Kabul; Ahmed Khel; Kandahar
- Established: 19 March 1881
- Ribbon: 33mm, dark green with broad crimson edges.
- Related: Kabul to Kandahar Star

The Afghanistan Medal, sanctioned on 19 March 1881, was awarded to members of the British and Indian armies who served in Afghanistan between 1878 and 1880 during the Second Afghan War, the first war being from 1839 to 1842.

The war was caused by British fears of increasing Russian involvement in Afghan affairs. In 1877 the Afghan Amir refused to accept a British Resident and in 1878 agreed a treaty with Russia granting it protective rights in Afghanistan. In response, a British-led force entered the country in November 1878 and advanced on Kabul. After defeats at Ali Musjid and Peiwar Kotal, the Afghans sued for peace and accepted a British Resident in Kabul, the war ending on 26 May 1879. After the Resident was murdered on 3 September 1879, the war recommenced. A British-led force again occupied Kabul, defeating the Afghans en route at Charasia. Sporadic fighting continued and after defeat at Maiwand, a British force was besieged in Kandahar. General Roberts led a column that marched from Kabul to relieve Kandahar, the resulting Afghan defeat leading to the conclusion of the war in September 1880. The soldiers who took part in General Roberts' march were awarded the Kabul to Kandahar Star in addition to the Afghanistan Medal.

Medals awarded to the 66th Foot (Berkshire Regiment) and E Battery of B Brigade, Royal Artillery, rate a high premium as these units sustained the heaviest casualties at the battle of Maiwand in July 1880.

When the first phase of the war ended in May 1879, it was proposed that the India General Service Medal be issued with clasps for Afghanistan, Ali Musjid and Peiwar Kotal. However, when the war recommenced in September 1879, it was decided to award a distinct medal to cover the whole campaign.

== Description ==
The Afghanistan Medal is a circular silver medal, 36 millimetres (1.4 in) in diameter, with the following design:

- The obverse shows a veiled effigy of Queen Victoria, facing left, with "VICTORIA REGINA ET IMPERATRIX" around the edge.
- The reverse shows marching and mounted soldiers with arms with an elephant carrying a cannon. In the upper-left of the medal around the edges is "AFGHANISTAN" and on the bottom in a straight line is "1878-79-80"
- The medal hangs from a plain suspender which is attached to the medal with a double toe claw. The ribbon is 33 millimetres (1.3 in) wide and is dark green with broad crimson edges.
- The recipient's rank, name and unit are engraved on the rim of the medal.
- Plain silver clasps were awarded and are found as follows:
  - "ALI MUSJID" (21 November 1878)
  - "PEIWAR KOTAL" (2 December 1878)
  - "CHARASIA" (6 October 1879)
  - "KABUL" (10–23 December 1879)
  - "AHMED KHEL" (19 April 1880)
  - "KANDAHAR" (1 September 1880)

The maximum number of clasps awarded to any one man was four.

The medal was awarded without a clasp to those who saw service in Afghanistan between 22 November 1878 – 26 May 1879, or 3 September 1879 – 20 September 1880, but did not take part in these major actions.

A bronze version for issue to authorised native Indian followers, including bearers, grooms and grasscutters, was proposed. Although considered and specimens produced, no bronze awards were finally made.

== See also ==
- British campaign medals
- Second Afghan War
- Operational Service Medal for Afghanistan (Post 2001)

== Bibliography ==
- Dorling, Captain H. Taprell. (1956) Ribbons and Medals. A.H.Baldwin & Sons, London, UK.
- Duckers, P. (2000) British Campaign Medals 1815–1914. Shire Publications Limited, Buckinghamshire, UK.
- Joslin, Litherland and Simpkin. (1988) British Battles and Medals. Spink & Son, London, UK.
- Mayo, John Horsley. (1897). Medals and Decorations of the British Army and Navy, Volume II. A. Constable & Co, London, UK.
- Miller, Ian. Deserving of silver, not bronze. Orders & Medals Research Society Journal, volume 63 (3), September 2024.
- Mussel, J (eds). (2015) Medals Yearbook – 2015. Token Publishing Limited, Devon, UK.
- Roberts, Field Marshal Lord. (1897). Forty-one Years in India. Richard Bentley & Son, London, UK.
