= General Burrows =

General Burrows may refer to:

- George Burrows (Indian Army officer) (1827–1917), British Indian Army brigadier general
- Montagu Brocas Burrows (1894–1967), British Army lieutenant general

== See also ==
- William Ward Burrows I (1758–1805), Commandant of the Marine Corps as a lieutenant colonel
- Silas M. Burroughs (politician) (1810–1860), New York State Militia brigadier general
