= Malalai of Maiwand =

Afghan folk hero (1861–1880)

- Born: 1861; Khig, Kandahar, Emirate of Afghanistan
- Died: 27 July 1880 (aged 18–19); Maiwand, Kandahar, Emirate of Afghanistan
- Other names: Malala, Anna, Malalai Anna
- Known for: Battle of Maiwand

Malalai of Maiwand (Pashto: د ميوند ملالۍ [malɑˈləi]), also known as Malala (Pashto: ملاله), or Malalai Anna (Pashto: ملالۍ انا, meaning Malalai the "Grandmother") is a national folk hero of Afghanistan who purportedly rallied Afghan soldiers at the Battle of Maiwand during the Second Anglo-Afghan War. She was alleged to have fought alongside Ayub Khan and bore responsibility for the Afghan victory at the Battle of Maiwand on 27 July 1880. She is also known as 'The Afghan Jeanne d'Arc' or as 'The Afghan Molly Pitcher' to the Western world. There are many schools, hospitals, and other institutions named after her in Afghanistan, and her story is told in Afghan school text books.

== Biography ==
Malalai was born into the Ishaqzai tribe in 1861 in the village of Khig, about 3 mi (4.8 km) southwest of the then village of Maiwand in the southern Kandahar province of Afghanistan.

During the Second Anglo-Afghan War, military forces from British India invaded the Emirate of Afghanistan. By the summer of 1880, the British, along with their Indian army, had launched a major expedition into Kandahar Province. The main garrison of the British was located in Kandahar, which is the closest city to the town of Maiwand. The military of Afghanistan was represented by commander Ayub Khan, son of Afghan Emir Sher Ali Khan. Malalai's father, who was a shepherd, and her fiancé joined with Ayub Khan's army in the large attack on the British-Indian forces in July 1880. Like many Afghan women, Malalai Ishaqzai was there to help tend to the wounded or provide water and spare weapons. According to local sources, this was also supposed to be her wedding day.

When the Afghan army was losing morale, despite their superior numbers, Malalai allegedly took the Afghan flag and shouted:

Young love! If you do not fall in the battle of Maiwand,
By God, someone is saving you as a symbol of shame!

This inspired the Afghan fighters to redouble their efforts. When a lead flag-bearer was killed, Malalai Ishaqzai went forward and held up the flag (some versions say she used her veil as a flag), singing a landai (a short folk-song sung by Afghan women):

With a drop of my sweetheart's blood,
Shed in defense of the Motherland,
Will I put a beauty spot on my forehead,
Such as would put to shame the rose in the garden!

Although Malalai was killed in the battle, "the Afghans followed her lead and attacked the British invaders with renewed vigor." After the battle, Malalai was honored for her efforts and buried in her native village of Khig, where her grave remains today. She was 18 or 19 at the time of her death. She is buried in the village of Karez along with her father and fiancé, locals regard her grave as a shrine.

The Pashtun poet Ajmal Khattak wrote the following lines about Malalai:

My Malalai is living, and they praise others' beauty.
Though they have eyes, they are blind.

== Legacy ==
Malalai became a common female name in Afghanistan. Schools, hospitals, and other institutions are named after her. The Pakistani activist Malala Yousafzai was also named in honor of Malalai.

Malalai made an appearance in an animated opening scene of the 2015 documentary film, He Named Me Malala.

== Reception ==
The authenticity of the story and of Malalai has been questioned by many scholars. Even though she has become well received by the Afghan state and many believe it to be genuine, it seems to be more of a folklore than historical reality. No British historian of that time referred to or mentioned Malalai's name, even the local records are missing. The British author Howard Hensmen, in his book The Afghan War, does mention that one woman was found amongst the dead in Ahmad khel, but the battle of Ahmad khail occurred on 19 April 1880, while the battle of Maiwand was on 27 July 1880.

Afghan historian Muhammad Siddiq Farhand wrote a three volume book "Afghanistan in the past five centuries" a very distinguished piece in Afghan history, he also failed to mention a woman named Malala.

The first time Malalai's name was mentioned was between 1920-1940. Some believe it was Abdul Hai Habibi who coined the story during the period of Pashto Tolana to support the national narrative and Pashtun nationalism.

== See also ==
- Nazo Tokhi, a 17th-century Afghan warrior
- Malala Yousafzai, the youngest and the first Pashtun Nobel Prize laureate, who was named after Malalai of Maiwand
