= Battle of Maiwand =

1880 battle of the Second Anglo-Afghan War

Coordinates: 31°44′00″N 65°08′00″E

- Part of Second Anglo-Afghan War
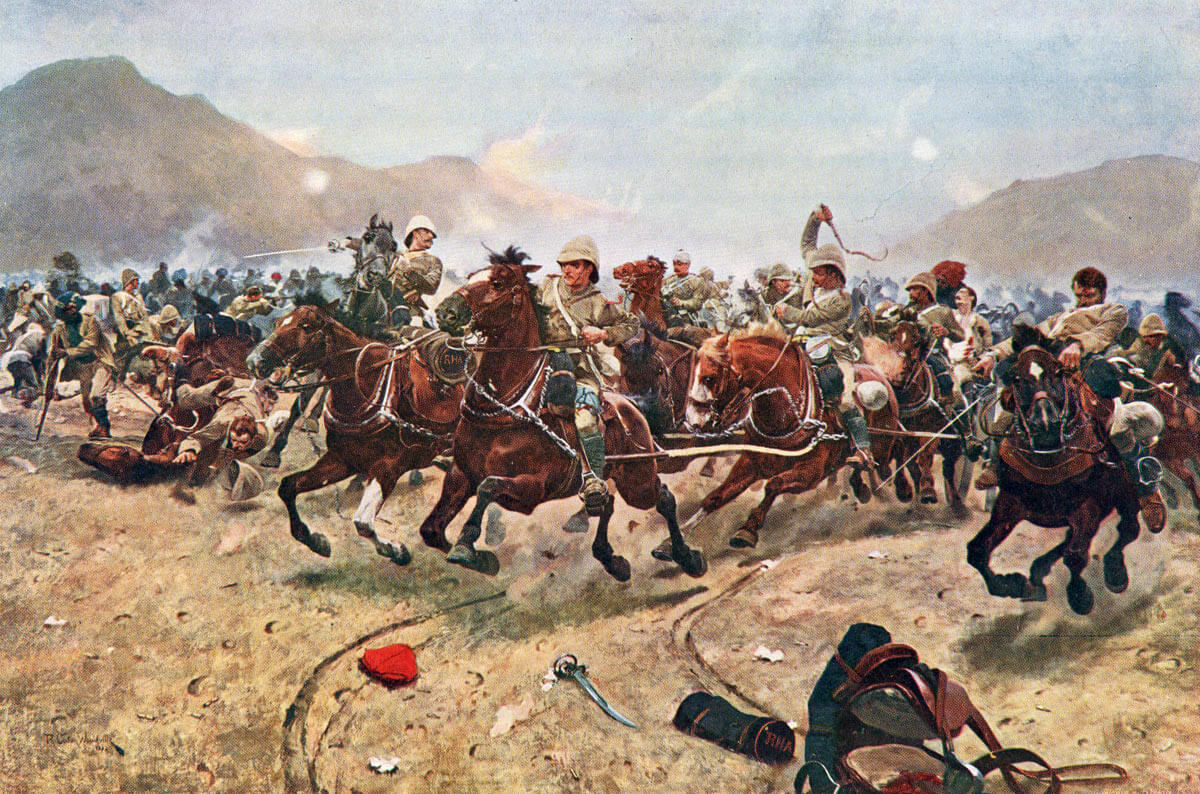
- Maiwand: Saving the Guns; Richard Caton Woodville Jr., 1883
Date	27 July 1880
Location	Near Maiwand, Kandahar Province
Result	Afghan victory

Belligerents
(United Kingdom) British Empire: India	Emirate of Afghanistan

Commanders and leaders
(United Kingdom) George Burrows	(Afghanistan) Ayub Khan

Strength
2,500; 12 cannons	12,000; 36 cannons

Casualties and losses
21 officers killed 948 men and 800 camp followers killed 169 men and 8 officers wounded	2,500–3,000 killed and wounded

The Battle of Maiwand (Note: Pashto: د ميوند جگړه) was fought on 27 July 1880 during the Second Anglo-Afghan War. Fought near the village of Maiwand in Kandahar Province, the battle resulted in an Afghan army of 12,000 composed of 9,000 infantry and 3,000 cavalry under Mohammad Ayub Khan defeating a force of 2,500 British and Indian troops under Brigadier-general George Burrows. The Afghans suffered between 2,500 and 3,000 men killed and wounded while Burrows' force suffered possibly as high as 1,200 killed. Though the battle proved to be a major setback for the British, they would go on to decisively defeat Ayub Khan at the Battle of Kandahar on 1 September.

== Background ==
Before the battle, the campaign had gone well for the British. They had defeated Afghan forces at Ali Masjid, Peiwar kotal, Kabul, and the Battle of Ahmed Khel, and they had occupied numerous cities and towns, including Kandahar, Dakka, and Jalalabad.

Mohammad Ayub Khan, Sher Ali Khan's younger son, who had been holding Herat during the British operations at Kabul and Kandahar, set out towards Kandahar with a small army in June, and a brigade under Brigadier-General Burrows was detached from Kandahar to oppose him. Burrows' brigade, some 2,500 strong with about 500 British troops including a battery of 9-pounder guns (4.1 kg), advanced to Helmand, opposite Gereshk, to oppose Ayub Khan, but was there deserted by the levies of Sher Ali, the British-appointed wali of Kandahar. Burrows's troops engaged and defeated the rebellious levies and captured four smoothbore 6-pounder guns and two smoothbore 12-pounder howitzers (5.4 kg). Burrows then fell back to a position at Kushk-i-Nakhud, halfway to Kandahar where he could intercept Ayub Khan if he headed for either Ghazni or Kandahar. He remained there a week, during which time the captured guns were added to his force with additional gunners drawn from the British infantry.

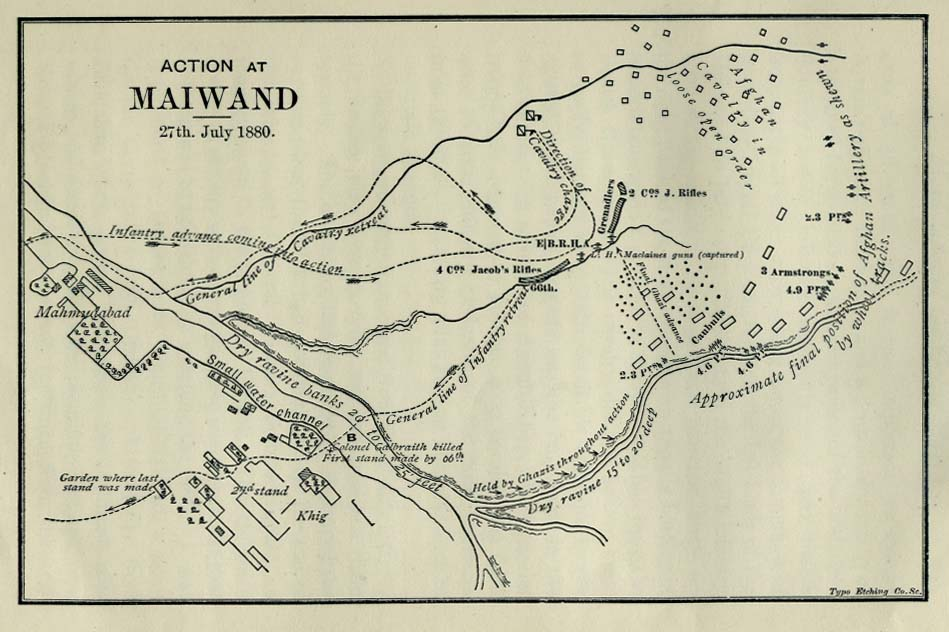
Map of the battlefield

== Battle ==
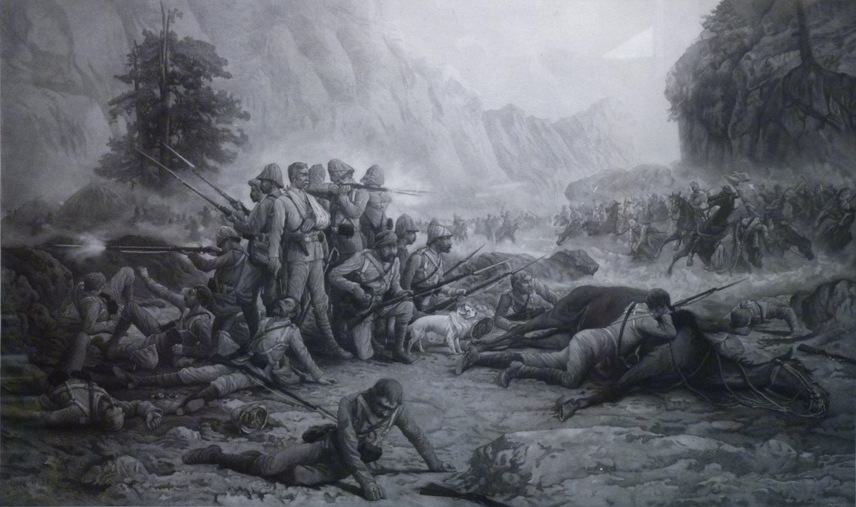
Frank Feller: The Last Eleven at Maiwand

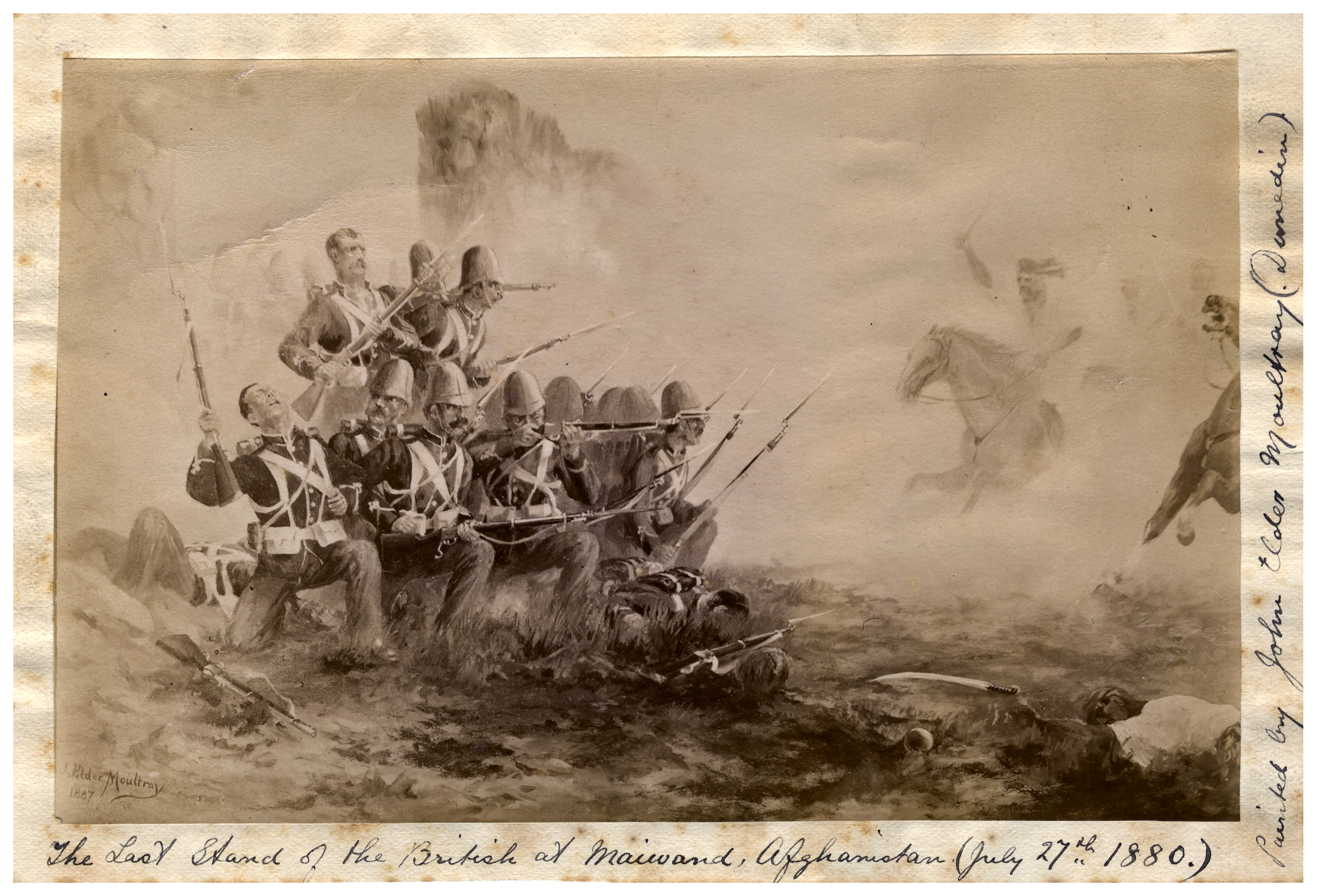
John Moultray: The Last Stand of the British at Maiwand

On the afternoon of 26 July information was received that the Afghan force was making for the Maiwand Pass a few miles away (half-dozen km). Burrows decided to move early the following day to break-up the Afghan advance guard. At about 10 am horsemen were seen and engaged, and the brigade started to deploy for battle. Burrows was not aware that it was Ayub's main force. The Afghans numbered 12,000 including 9,000 infantry and 3,000 cavalry as well as six batteries of artillery, including some very modern Armstrong guns. The Afghan guns gradually came into action and a three-hour artillery duel ensued at an opening range of about 1,700 yards (1,600 m), during which the British captured smoothbore guns on the left, expended their ammunition and withdrew to replenish it. This enabled the Afghans to force the left battalion back. The left flank comprising Indian infantry regiments gave way and rolled in a great wave to the right; the 66th Regiment of Foot, as a result of this pressure was swept away by the pressure of the Ghazi attack.

E Battery of B Brigade Royal Horse Artillery (Captain Slade commanding) and a half-company of Bombay Sappers and Miners under Lieutenant Henn (Royal Engineers) stood fast, covering the retreat of the entire British brigade. E Battery kept firing until the last moment, two sections (four guns) limbering up when the Afghans were 15 yards (14 m) away, but the third section (Lieutenant Maclaine) was overrun. Maclaine was captured and held as a prisoner in Kandahar, where his body was found near Ayub Khan's tent during the British attack on 1 September, apparently murdered to prevent his liberation. Sepoys who were prisoners with Maclaine testified that Ayub Khan had ordered the guards not to kill the prisoners before fleeing around two hours before the arrival of the British at his camp. Unfortunately more than an hour later a guard went against this order and took his life. The British guns captured during the action were also recovered at Kandahar.

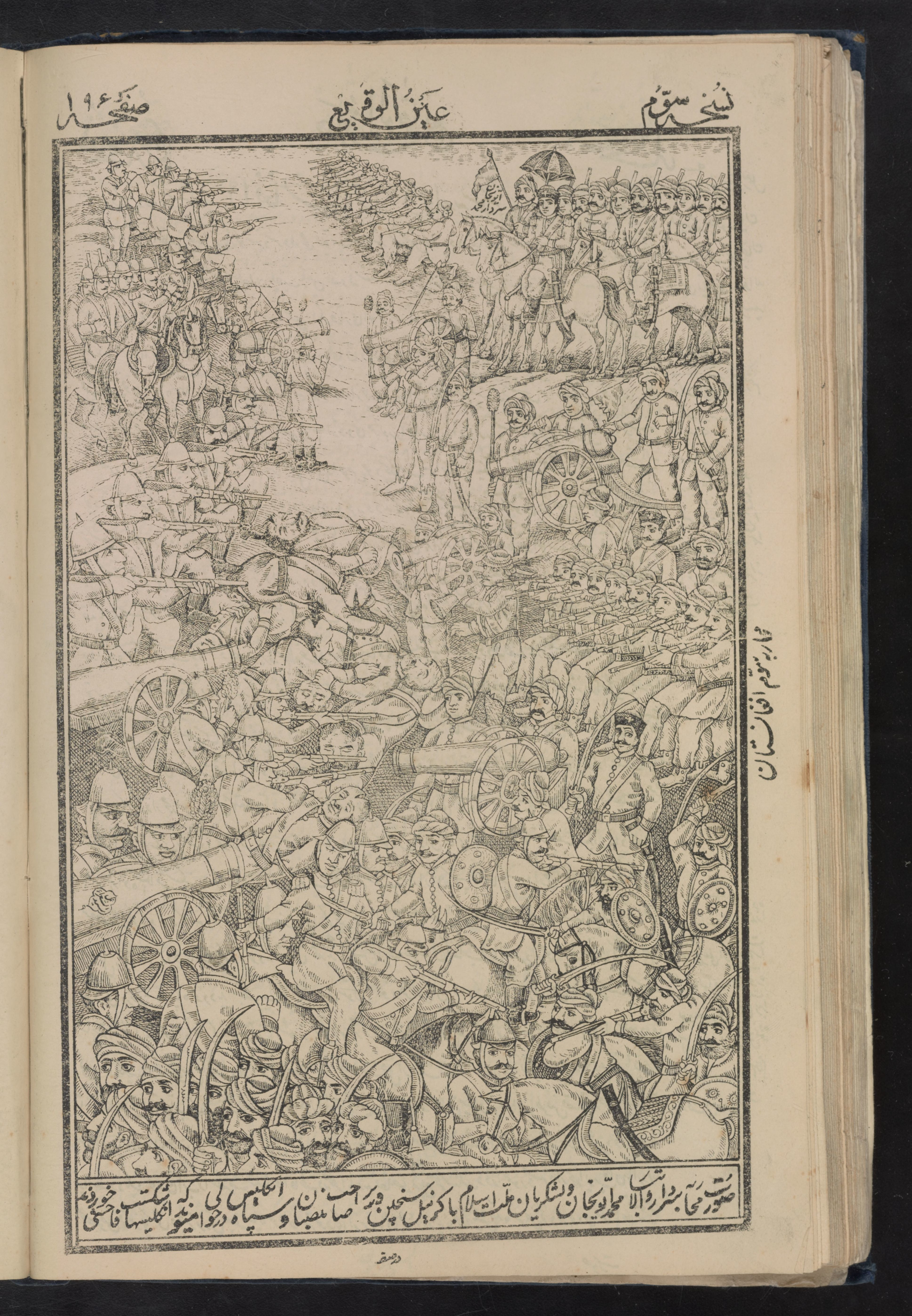
Depiction of the battle in a near-contemporary Persian source, from the Collected Works of Riyazi

E Battery came into action again some 400 yd (370 m) back. The Sappers and Miners retreated as the guns withdrew. Henn and 14 of his men afterwards joined some remnants of the 66th Foot and Bombay Grenadiers in a small enclosure at a garden in a place called Khig where a determined last stand was made. Though the Afghans shot them down one by one, they fired steadily until only eleven of their number (two officers and nine other ranks) were left, and the survivors then charged out into the masses of the enemy and perished. Henn is the only officer who has been positively identified in that band and he led the final charge. No Englishman lived to tell the story of the Last Eleven at Maiwand. It was reported to the British later that year by a former officer of Ayub Khan's army, who said that the Afghans had been truly impressed by the bravery of those men.

== Aftermath ==
Word of the disaster reached Kandahar the following day and a relief force was dispatched. This met the retreating force at Kokeran.

The British were routed but managed a withdrawal due to their own efforts and the apathy of the Afghans. Of the 2,500 British and Indian troops engaged, over 960 were killed and nearly 170 wounded. The Grenadiers lost 64% of their strength and the 66th lost 62%, including twelve officers. Of those present (two companies being detached) the cavalry losses were much smaller. British and Indian regimental casualties were:

- 1st Infantry Brigade (Brigadier-General George Burrows, commanding)
  - 66th (Berkshire) Regiment of Foot: 286 dead, 32 wounded.
  - 1st Bombay Native Infantry (Grenadiers): 366 dead, 61 wounded.
  - 30th Bombay Native Infantry (Jacob’s Rifles): 241 dead, 32 wounded.
  - Bombay Sappers and Miners (No.2 Company): 16 dead, 6 wounded.
- 1st Cavalry Brigade (Brigadier-General Thomas Nuttall, commanding)
  - E Battery / B Brigade, Royal Horse Artillery: 19 dead, 16 wounded.
  - 3rd Bombay Light Cavalry: 27 dead, 18 wounded.
  - 3rd Scinde Horse: 15 dead, 1 wounded.

One estimate of Afghan casualties is 3,000 killed or wounded, reflecting the desperate nature of much of the fighting, although other sources give 1,500 Afghan "regulars" and up to 4,000 Ghazis killed, and 1,500 seriously wounded.

Two Victoria Crosses were awarded for acts of valour performed during the battle and during the retreat to Kandahar. Both medals went to members of E/B Battery, RHA. One was awarded to Sergeant Patrick Mullane, for attempting to save the life of a wounded colleague during the withdrawal of their battery from the field; the other went to Gunner James Collis, who during the retreat to Kandahar drew the attention of enemy fire upon himself instead of upon wounded colleagues.

The battle dampened morale for the British side, but was also partly a disappointment for Ayub Khan, Governor of Herat and commander of the Afghans in this battle, because he had lost so many men to gain a small advantage. Ayub Khan did manage to shut the British up in Kandahar, resulting in General Frederick Roberts's famous 314-mile (505 km) relief march from Kabul to Kandahar in August. The resulting Battle of Kandahar on 1 September was a decisive victory for the British.

The loss of the Queen's Colour and regimental colour of the 66th (Berkshire) Regiment of Foot at the Battle of Maiwand, following so soon upon the loss of the Colours of the 2nd/24th (2nd Warwickshire) Regiment at the Battle of Isandlwana (22 January 1879) during the Anglo-Zulu War, resulted in colours no longer being taken on active service.

== Maiwand in poetry, art, and fiction ==
=== Poetry ===
Rudyard Kipling, who had researched this battle in 1892, included the small yet dramatic poem entitled "That Day" about the action at Maiwand in his Barrack-Room Ballads collection:

"There was thirty dead an' wounded on the ground we wouldn't keep -
No, there wasn't more than twenty when the front began to go;
But, Christ! along the line o' flight they cut us up like sheep,
An' that was all we gained by doing so.

I 'eard the knives be'ind me, but I dursn't face my man,
Nor I don't know where I went to, 'cause I didn't 'alt to see,
Till I 'eard a beggar squealin' out for quarter as 'e ran,
An' I thought I knew the voice an' - it was me!

We was 'idin' under bedsteads more than 'arf a march away;
We was lyin' up like rabbits all about the countryside;
An' the major cursed 'is Maker 'cause 'e lived to see that day'
An' the colonel broke 'is sword acrost, an' cried."

The events of the battle were also commemorated in a poem by the notoriously bad Scottish poet William McGonagall entitled "The Last Berkshire Eleven".

Poems of the victory at Maiwand have passed into Pashtun and Afghan folklore. As Afghan legend would have it, the battle created an unlikely hero in the shape of an Afghan woman called Malalai, who on seeing the Afghan forces falter, used her veil as a standard and encouraged the men by shouting out:

"Young love if you do not fall in the battle of Maiwind;
By God someone is saving you as a token of shame;"

She also spoke the following landay (Pashto Poetry):

With a drop of my sweetheart's blood,
Shed in defense of the Motherland,
Will I put a beauty spot on my forehead,
Such as would put to shame the rose in the garden.

=== Art ===
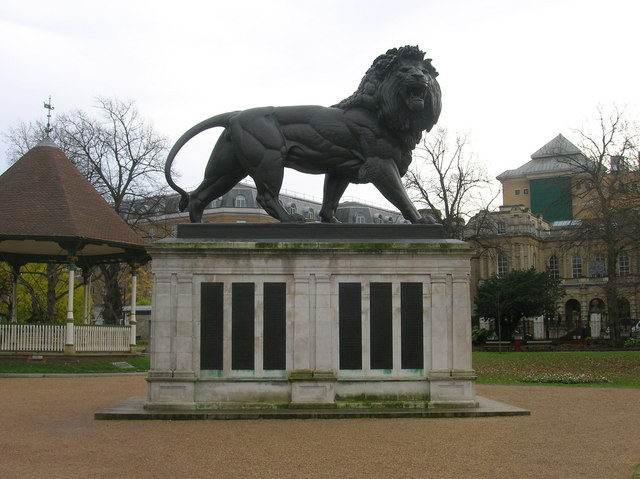
The Maiwand Lion in Forbury Gardens, Reading, the unofficial symbol of the town

The battle was the subject of several paintings and was covered extensively in the illustrated press. Frank Feller, a Swiss artist domiciled in England painted The Last Eleven at Maiwand in 1882 depicting a small group of men from the 66th Regiment making a last stand. The events surrounding E/B Battery Royal Horse Artillery were portrayed by Godfrey Douglas Giles, Richard Caton Woodville and Stanley Wood.

A cast iron statue of a lion (the Maiwand Lion) was built by George Blackall Simonds in Reading and unveiled in 1886 to commemorate those who died in battle. A monument was built in the 1950s on the Maiwand Square in Kabul in commemoration of the battle by an Afghan architect Is-matulla Saraj.

A memorial was erected in central London to a remarkable canine survivor of the engagement: Bobbie, the Berkshires' regimental mascot. Bobbie was wounded during the fighting, but was spotted the following day by survivors, making his way back to the fort.

=== Fiction ===
The fictional Doctor Watson, companion of Sherlock Holmes, was wounded in the Battle of Maiwand (as described in the opening chapter of A Study in Scarlet). He may have been based upon the 66th regiment's Medical Officer, Surgeon Major Alexander Francis Preston. The battle has also been documented in Sir Arthur Conan Doyle's short story The Summer.

The Battle of Maiwand is also mentioned in Jeffery Deaver's short story The Westphalian Ring. The main character, Peter Goodcastle, had served in the Royal Horse Artillery there and had turned to burglary to avenge the shoddy treatment he had suffered on his return to Britain. In the short story, he was arrested by none other than Dr. Watson, but later managed to escape suspicion by outsmarting Sherlock Holmes, so the two men may have already met earlier.

== See also ==
- Battles of the Second Anglo-Afghan War
- The Great Game – 19th-century Anglo-Russian confrontation
