= Musa Khan =

Musa Khan may refer to:

- Mohammad Musa Khan (Afghanistan) (1868–1951), Emir of Afghanistan
- Muhammad Musa (general) (1908–1991), commander in chief of Pakistan's army
- Musa Khan Ahmadzai (born 1956), governor of Ghazni Province, Afghanistan
- Musa Khan of Bengal, ruler of Bengal from 1599 to 1611
- Muhammad Musa (born 2000), Pakistani cricketer, also known as Musa Khan

== See also ==
- Moosa Khan, a 2001 Pakistani film
- Musakhan, a Palestinian chicken dish
