= Maiwand =

Village in Kandahar Province, Afghanistan

- Location in Afghanistan
- Coordinates: 31°44′22″N 65°08′24″E
- Country: Afghanistan
- Province: Kandahar Province
- District: Maywand District
- Time zone: UTC+4:30

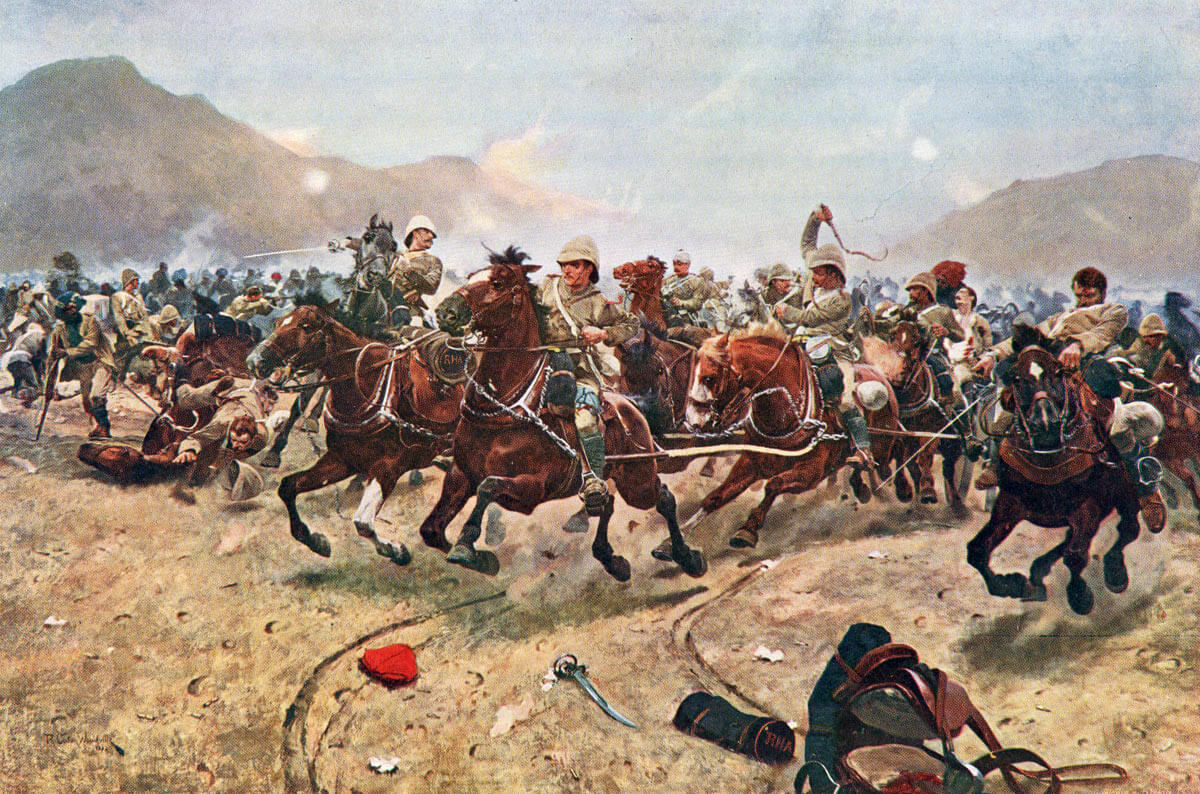
Royal Horse Artillery fleeing from Afghan attack at the Battle of Maiwand, painting by Richard Caton Woodville Jr. (1883)

Maiwand (Pashto: میوند) is a village in Afghanistan within the Maywand District of Kandahar Province. It is located 50 miles northwest of Kandahar, on the main Kandahar–Lashkargah road.

The area is irrigated by the Helmand and Arghandab Valley Authority.

Maiwand is the birthplace of the 13th-century Sufi saint Lal Shahbaz Qalandar.

The village is notable for the Battle of Maiwand, which took place on July 27, 1880, during the Second Anglo-Afghan War. Ayub Khan together with Malalai Anaa defeated a British brigade under General Burrows. The British commemorated the battle with a gigantic Maiwand Lion memorial sculpture at Forbury Gardens in Reading, Berkshire in England.
