= 66th (Berkshire) Regiment of Foot =

- Active: 10 December 1756–1 July 1881
- Country: Kingdom of Great Britain (1756–1800); United Kingdom (1801–1881)
- Branch: British Army
- Type: Line infantry
- Size: One battalion (two battalions 1803–1816)
- Garrison/HQ: Brock Barracks, Reading
- Colours: Facings – Green
- Engagements: Napoleonic Wars; Anglo-Nepalese War; Second Anglo-Afghan War

The 66th (Berkshire) Regiment of Foot was an infantry regiment of the British Army, raised in 1756. Under the Childers Reforms it amalgamated with the 49th (Princess Charlotte of Wales's) (Hertfordshire) Regiment of Foot to form the Princess Charlotte of Wales's (Berkshire Regiment) in 1881.

== History ==
=== Formation ===
The formation of the regiment was prompted by the expansion of the army as a result of the commencement of the Seven Years' War. On 25 August 1756 it was ordered that a number of existing regiments should raise a second battalion; among those chosen was the 19th Regiment of Foot. The 2nd Battalion of the 19th Regiment of Foot was formed on 10 December 1756 and renumbered as the 66th Regiment of Foot on 21 April 1758. The regiment was posted to Jamaica in 1764 and then returned home in 1773. The regiment was given a county designation as the 66th (Berkshire) Regiment of Foot in 1782. In April 1785 the regiment embarked for the West Indies and was garrisoned at Saint Vincent before leaving for Gibraltar in January 1793.

=== Napoleonic Wars ===
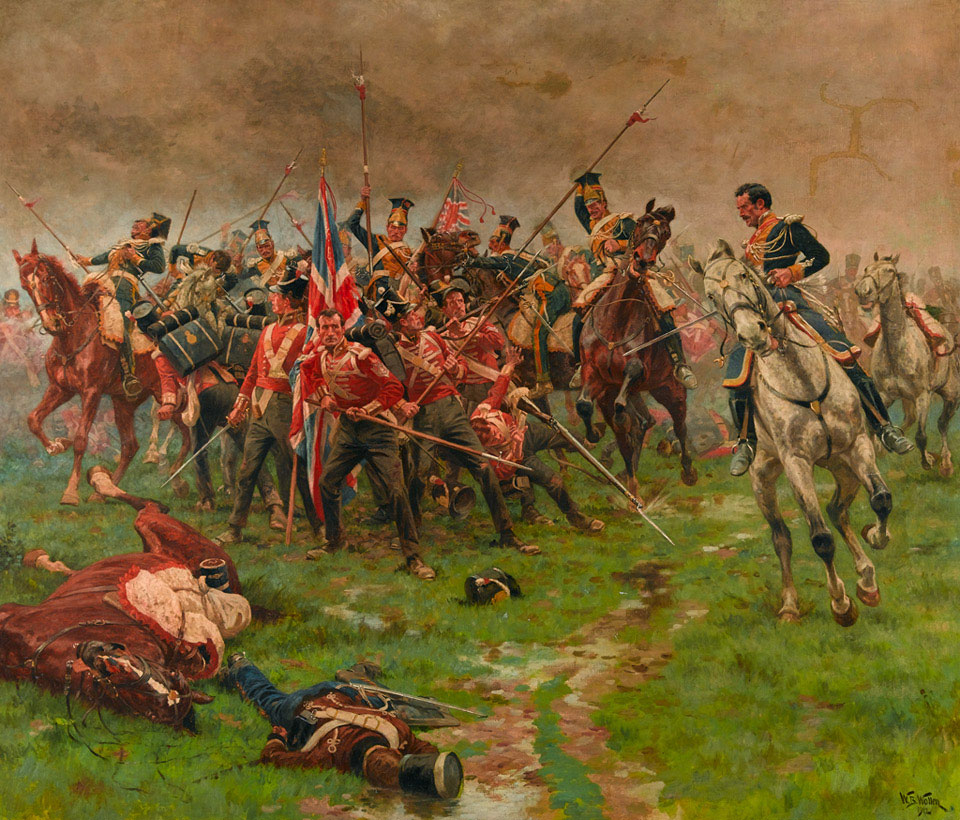
The Battle of Albuera in May 1811, where the 2nd battalion of the 66th Regiment suffered heavy losses: 16 of its officers and 310 of its men killed, wounded or missing

In early 1796 the regiment returned to the West Indies to take part in a British invasion of Saint-Domingue, where most of the troops caught fever. The regiment returned to Jamaica in September 1798 and moved to Nova Scotia in early 1799 and on to Newfoundland in May 1800 before returning home in October 1802.

A second battalion was raised in July 1803. The 1st battalion embarked for Trincomalee in Ceylon in March 1804 aboard the East Indiaman Brunswick. The battalion moved on to India in April 1814. From India it was deployed to Nepal in late 1815 for service in the Anglo-Nepalese War.

Meanwhile, the 2nd battalion embarked for Portugal in April 1809 for service in the Peninsular War. It saw action at the Second Battle of Porto in May 1809, the Battle of Talavera in July 1809 and the Battle of Bussaco in September 1810 before falling back to the Lines of Torres Vedras. It also took part in the First Siege of Badajoz in January 1811 and the Battle of Albuera in May 1811. At Albuera the battalion suffered heavy losses: 16 of its officers and 310 of its men killed, wounded or missing. It went on to fight at the Battle of Arroyo dos Molinos in October 1811 and the Battle of Vitoria in June 1813. It then pursued the French Army into France and fought at the Battle of the Pyrenees in July 1813, the Battle of Nivelle in November 1813 and the Battle of Nive in December 1813 as well as the Battle of Orthez in February 1814 and the Battle of Toulouse in April 1814. In July 1817 the battalion arrived in Saint Helena with orders to guard Napoleon who was in exile: the two battalions amalgamated again later that year.

=== The Victorian era ===
The regiment left Saint Helena in May 1821 following Napoleon's death. It was deployed to Canada in August 1827 before returning home in October 1840. It was sent to Gibraltar in July 1845 before returning to the West Indies in 1848. It returned to Canada in 1851 and returned home in 1854. In March 1857 it was sent to India to help suppress the Indian Rebellion. It returned to England in March 1865 but went back to India in February 1870.

=== Second Anglo-Afghan War ===
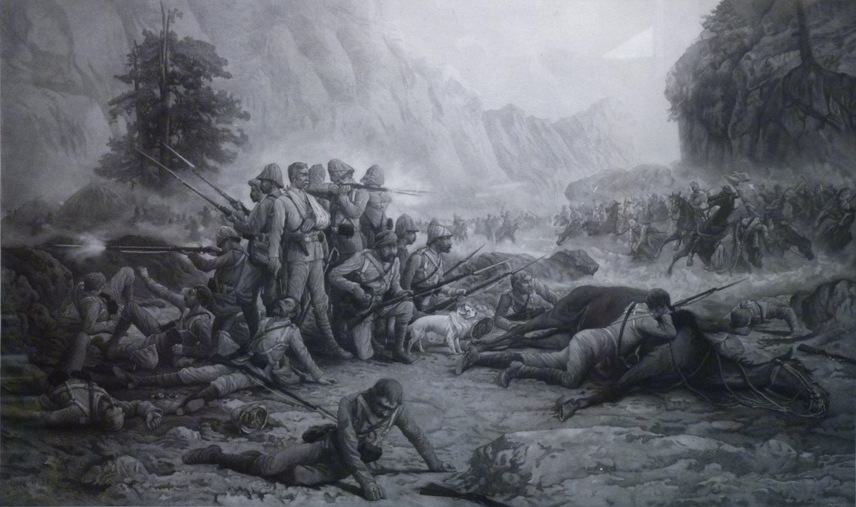
The Last Eleven at Maiwand by Frank Feller

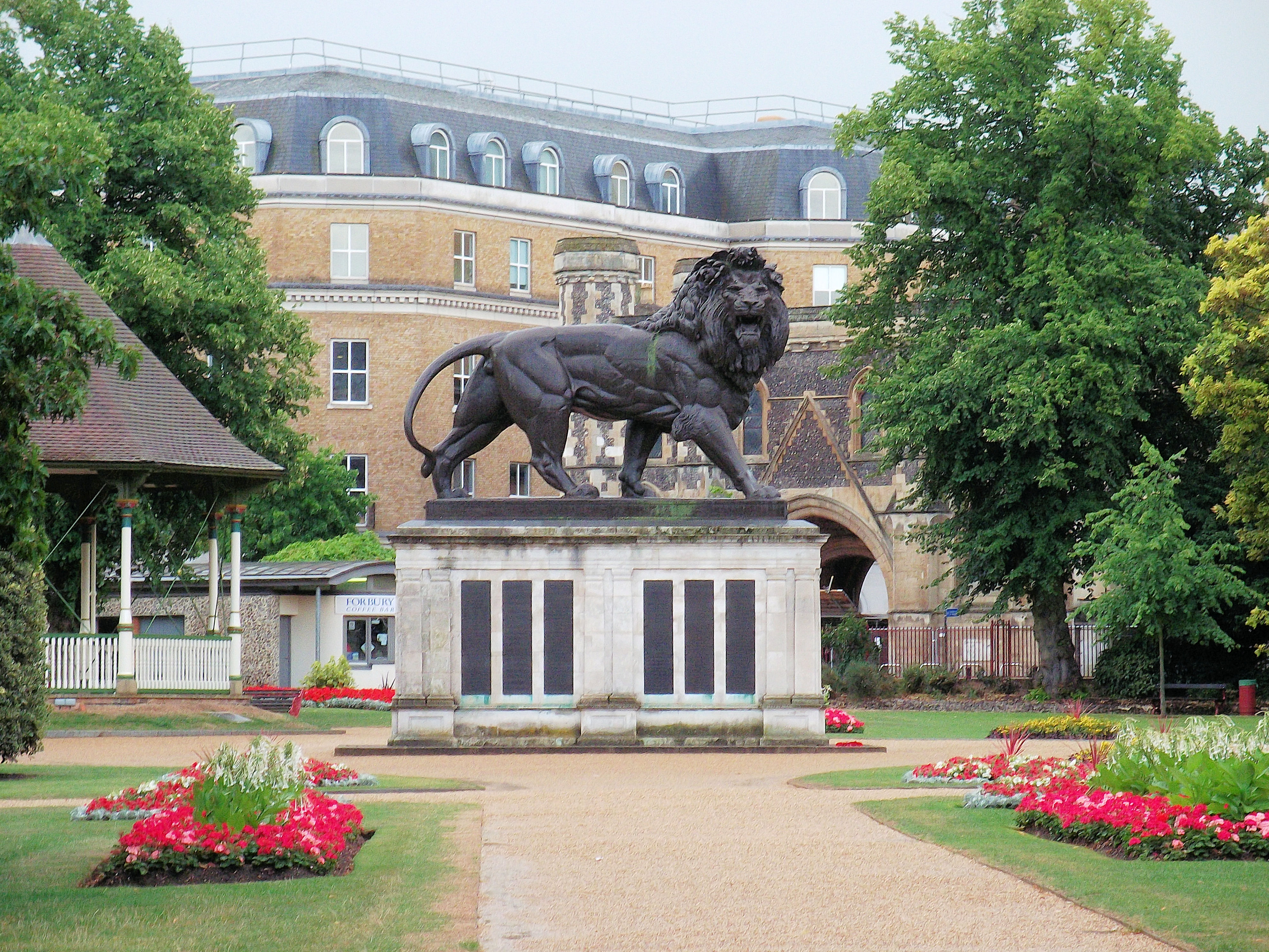
The Maiwand Lion, Forbury Gardens, Reading

The regiment was deployed to Afghanistan in early 1880 and took part in the Battle of Maiwand in July 1880 where the British forces were routed and most of the regiment was caught up in the rout. Some 140 of them made a stand at the Mundabad Ravine, which ran along the south side of the battlefield, but were forced back with heavy losses. Eventually 56 survivors made it to the shelter of a walled garden and made a further stand. Eventually the 56 were whittled down to only 11 men—two officers and nine other ranks. An Afghan artillery officer described their end:

"These men charged from the shelter of a garden and died with their faces to the enemy, fighting to the death. So fierce was their charge, and so brave their actions, no Afghan dared to approach to cut them down. So, standing in the open, back to back, firing steadily, every shot counting, surrounded by thousands, these British soldiers died. It was not until the last man was shot down that the Afghans dared to advance on them. The behaviour of those last eleven was the wonder of all who saw it".

Officers who died in the action included: Lieutenant-Colonel James Galbraith, Captain Ernest Stephen Garratt, Captain William Hamilton M'Math, Captain Francis James Cullen, Captain Walter Roberts, Lieutenant Maurice Edward Rayner, Lieutenant Richard Trevor Chute, Second Lieutenant Arthur Honywood, Second Lieutenant Walter Rice Olivey and Second Lieutenant Harry James Outram Barr. This battle was the last time a British regiment lost its colours in battle.

A subscription led to two memorials in Reading: a window in St Mary's Church, and a large memorial sculpture, the Maiwand Lion, erected in 1886 in Forbury Gardens. The regiment also saw action at the Battle of Kandahar in September 1880.

=== Amalgamation ===
As part of the Cardwell Reforms of the 1870s, where single-battalion regiments were linked together to share a single depot and recruiting district in the United Kingdom, the 66th was linked with the 49th (Princess Charlotte of Wales's) (Hertfordshire) Regiment of Foot, and assigned to district no. 41 at Brock Barracks in Reading. On 1 July 1881 the Childers Reforms came into effect and the regiment amalgamated with the 49th (Princess Charlotte of Wales's) (Hertfordshire) Regiment of Foot to form the Princess Charlotte of Wales's (Royal Berkshire Regiment).

== Legacy ==
William McGonagall wrote of the Battle of Maiwand in his poem The Last Berkshire Eleven: The Heroes of Maiwand, which includes mention of Bobbie, the regimental pet dog, who survived the battle:

And they broke from the enclosure, and followed by the little dog,
And with excitement it was barking savagely, and leaping like a frog;
And from the field the last eleven refused to retire,
And with fixed bayonets they charged on the enemy in that sea of fire.

Dr. John H. Watson, fictional narrator of Sir Arthur Conan Doyle's Sherlock Holmes stories, was wounded while attached to the regiment at the 1880 Battle of Maiwand. He was on attachment from his own regiment, the 5th (Northumberland Fusiliers) Regiment of Foot.

== Battle honours ==
Battle honours won by the regiment were:

- Peninsular War: Douro, Talavera, Albuhera, Vittoria, Pyrenees, Nivelle, Nive, Orthes, Peninsula,
- Second Anglo-Afghan War: Kandahar 1880, Afghanistan 1879–80

== Colonels of the Regiment ==
Colonels of the Regiment were:

=== 66th Regiment of Foot ===
- 1758–1758: Lt-Gen. Edward Sandford
- 1758–1763: Maj-Gen. John La Fausille
- 1763–1776: Gen. Lord Adam Gordon
- 1776–1794: Lt-Gen. Joseph Gabbett

=== 66th (Berkshire) Regiment of Foot - (1782) ===
- 1794–1808: Gen. John Thomas de Burgh, 13th Earl of Clanricarde
- 1808–1829: Gen. Oliver Nicolls
- 1829–1835: Gen. Sir William Anson, 1st Baronet, KCB
- 1835–1859: Gen. Richard Blunt
- 1859–1870: Gen. Edward Wells Bell
- 1870–1881: Gen. Thomas Henry Johnston

== Sources ==
- Barczewski, Stephanie (2016). Heroic Failure and the British. Yale University Press. ISBN 978-0300180060.
- Doyle, Arthur Conan (1887). A Study in Scarlet. London: Ward, Lock & Co.
- Groves, John Percy (1887). The 66th Berkshire Regiment. A Brief Account of its Services at Home and Abroad, From 1758–1881. Reading: Joseph J Beecroft.
- Swinson, Arthur (1972). A Register of the Regiments and Corps of the British Army. London: The Archive Press. ISBN 0-85591-000-3.
