= John Moultray =

New Zealand artist (1865–1922)

- Born: 6 August 1865; Edinburgh, Scotland
- Died: 4 May 1922 (aged 56); Herbert, New Zealand
- Known for: History painting

John Moultray (6 August 1865 – 4 May 1922) was a New Zealand artist, active in the late 19th/early 20th century and best known for his history paintings. Originally from Edinburgh, Moultray migrated to New Zealand with his parents in 1883 and settled in Dunedin. In the years that followed, he executed several works, with many depicting aspects of the New Zealand Wars. He was also a war correspondent, reporting on the activities on the first contingent of New Zealand troops sent to South Africa in 1899 during the Second Boer War. Poor health affected his later years and he died at Herbert in 1922, aged 56.

== Early life ==
John Elder Moultray was born in Edinburgh, Scotland, on 6 August 1865, the second son of James Douglas Moultray, a landscape painter who had initially trained under Walter Ferguson and later worked with Horatio McCulloch. Tutored initially in art by his father, Moultray subsequently studied at the Edinburgh School of Art. In 1883, the Moultray family emigrated to New Zealand and settled in Dunedin. Seeking to connect with the local art community, Moultray and his father joined the Otago Art Society (OSA), and the latter was appointed to its committee. However, they later came into conflict with the other members over a design competition and resigned from the OSA.

== Professional career ==
Moultray sought a career as history painter, writing in 1898, he claimed that his "life's work should be the transference to canvas of the leading events of the colony, as I had discovered upon my arrival in New Zealand that it was a well-nigh neglected field among artists". Among his efforts were depictions of Maori sighting Captain James Cook's ship as it came into view off the New Zealand coast and of the 1886 eruption of Mount Tarawera, the latter a commission from Alfred Henry Burton, a prominent resident of Dunedin. Of particular interest to Moultray was the depiction of scenes from the New Zealand Wars, known to the Europeans as the 'Maori Wars'. He came to be considered one of the leading exponents in New Zealand in the subject. Among his works are Episode of the Maori Wars, A Trooper of the Wanganui Cavalry Attacked by a Hau-Hau, and The Battle of Te Ngutuo-te-Manu, Sept. 7, 1868. He made some effort towards accuracy, often making field trips to visit the sites of the events he was portraying and interviewing participants. Art historian Marilyn Park notes that some of the interviewees, usually British soldiers and Colonial militia, may have distorted the telling the events. However, his work was typical of Victorian attitudes towards indigenous peoples; they commonly showed the British participants favourably through the use of heroic postures, as well as light, bold colours while the Māori figures lack noticeable characterisation and often placed in darkened areas of the image.

After ceasing his membership of the OSA, Moultray exhibited at Auckland Society of Arts, the New Zealand Academy of Fine Arts, and in Melbourne. However, following the death of his father in 1911, he rejoined the OSA, exhibiting with it until 1916.

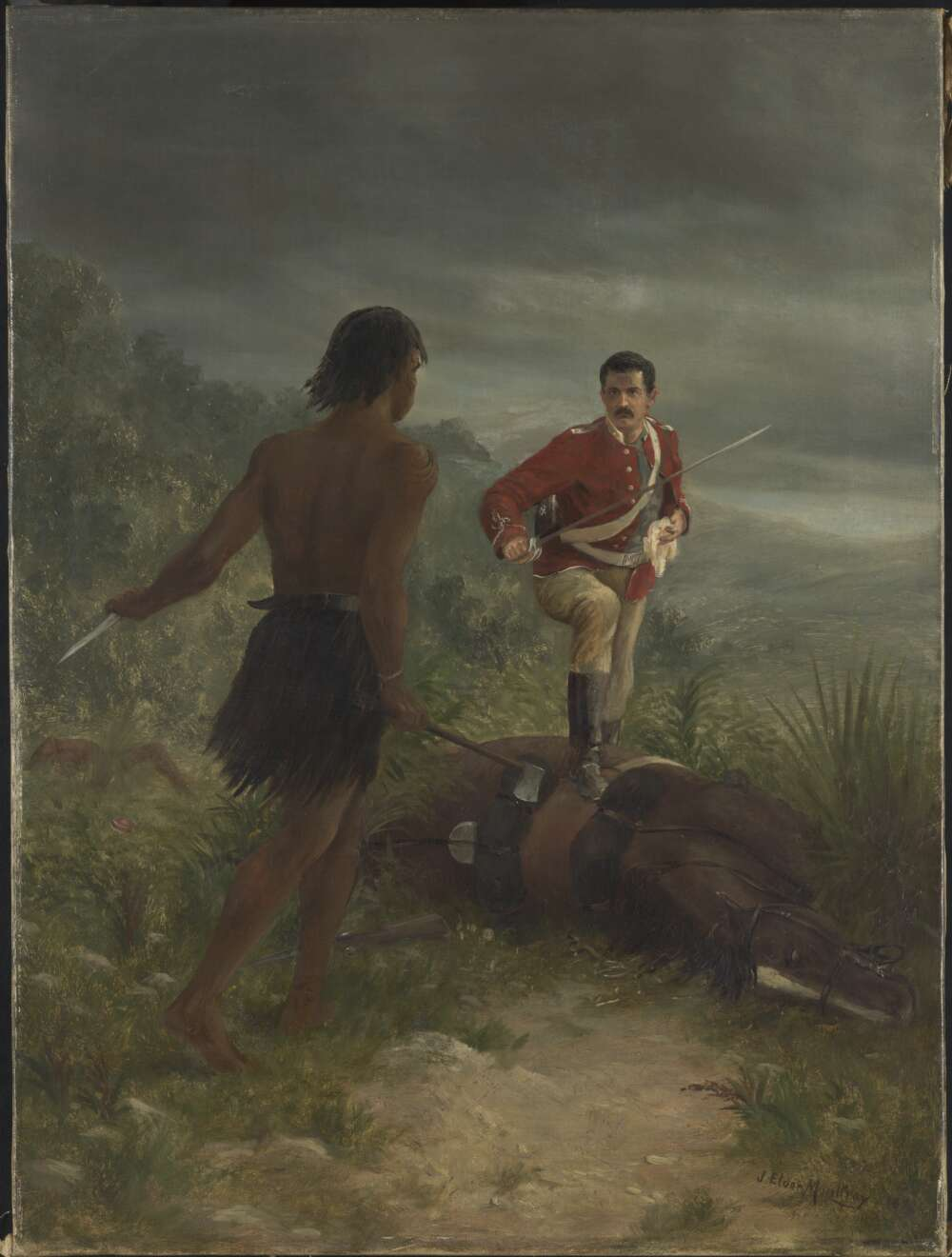
Moultray's A Trooper of the Wanganui Cavalry Attacked by a Hau-Hau, an oil on canvas executed in 1892 and in the collection of the National Library of Australia

On the outbreak of the Second Boer War, Moultray secured an appointment as a war correspondent for the Otago Daily Times and other regional newspapers and in late 1899, accompanied the First Contingent sent to South Africa. As well as writing of the exploits of the New Zealand troopers serving in Lieutenant-General John French's cavalry division, he made sketches which were published in the Otago Witness. He was repatriated to New Zealand in March 1900, on account of illness.

After his return to New Zeaand, Moultray worked out of an art studio on Frederick Street in Dunedin teaching art. He also resumed painting. In addition to his history work, he executed landscapes and works with Māori themes. In 1904 the Otago Daily Times and Witness published its Christmas Annual with numerous reproductions of his illustrations of events and notable individuals of Māori culture and mythology. Moultray would make other works with similar themes.

== Later life ==
Affected by poor health in his later years, Moultray gave up his Frederick Street studio and retired to Herbert, nearby to Dunedin. His health was such that he was unable to accept an offer to become headmaster at the Dunedin Art School. He died on 4 May 1922 at his home. He was survived by his wife and had no children.

Much of his artwork is privately owned but the Hocken Library has 24 of his paintings in its collection. Others are held by the Grey Moyle Trust with some on loan to the Auckland Museum although in storage. Another is held by the National Library of Australia. In modern times, his work is seen as archaic and old-fashioned but according to Park, Moultray's contributions to New Zealand art have been somewhat overlooked.
