= Mohammad Ayub Khan (Afghanistan) =

Victor of Maiwand

Mohammad Ayub Khan محمد ايوب خان
- Ghazi; Commander of the Faithful (Note: Arabic: أمير المؤمنين, romanized: ʾAmīr al-Muʾminīn [ʔa.miːr‿ul.muʔ.mi.niːn]); National Hero of Afghanistan; Victor of Maiwand; Afghan Prince Charlie
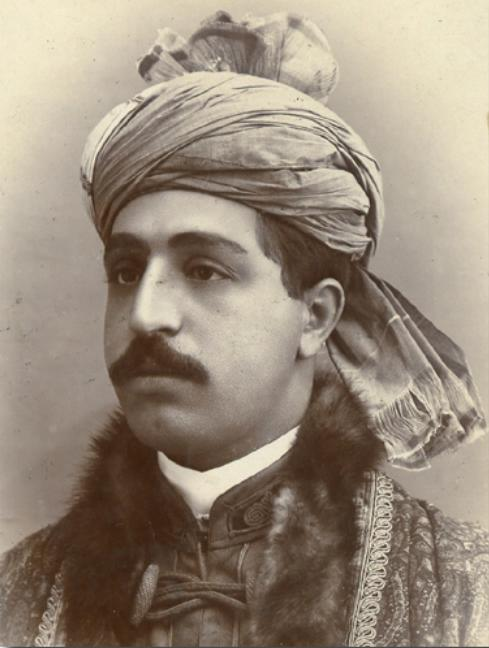
- Formal portrait, c. 1887

Emir of Herat
- Reign: March 1880 – 2 October 1881
- Predecessor: Office established (Mohammad Musa Khan as Emir of Afghanistan)
- Successor: Office abolished (Abdur Rahman Khan as Emir of Afghanistan)

Emir of Kandahar
- Reign: 20 July 1881 – 22 September 1881
- Predecessor: Office established (Abdur Rahman Khan as Emir of Afghanistan)
- Successor: Office abolished (Abdur Rahman Khan as Emir of Afghanistan)
- Born: 1857; Kabul, Emirate of Afghanistan
- Died: 7 April 1914 (aged 56–57); Lahore, Punjab, British India
- Burial: 1914; Peshawar, British India
- Spouse: 11 wives: Kishwar Begum Bobo Gul Begum A Hazara consort A daughter of Mohammad Sami Khan A Herati consort A daughter of Nur ud-Din Khan A daughter of Abdul Salam Khan A Persian consort A second Hazara consort A Kandahari consort A second Persian consort
- Issue: 15 sons and 10 daughters: Mohammad Abdul Qadir Khan Effendi Sultan Ahmad Khan Mohammad Akram Khan Abdul Aziz Khan Abdul Samad Khan Mohammad Sarwar Khan Sher Ahmad Khan Nur Ahmad Khan Mohammad Azam Khan Abdul Ahad Khan Mohammad Umar Khan Abdul Rashid Khan Mohammad Azim Khan Mohammad Rauf Khan Mohammad Asad Khan Saadat Begum Aalia Khanum Hamdam Khanum Halima Khanum Zeb un-Nisa Begum Sultanat Begum Amina Begum Humaira Khanum Maryam Begum Zahra Begum
Names
- Mohammad Ayub Khan
- Dynasty: Barakzai
- Father: Sher Ali Khan
- Mother: Qamar Jan, a daughter of Sa'adat Khan Mohmand
- Military career
- Conflicts: Second Anglo-Afghan War; Battle of Maiwand; Action at Grishk; Battle of Kandahar

Ghazi Mohammad Ayub Khan Barakzai, (Note: Pashto: محمد ايوب خان بارکزی, romanized: Muhammad Ayyub Xān Bārakzai [mu.wa.mad̪ ʔa.jub xɑn bɑ.ɾak.zaɪ, mu.ham.mad̪ ʔaj.jub xɑn bɑ.ɾak.zaɪ]; Persian: محمد ایوب خان بارکزی, romanized: Mohammad Ayyūb Khān Bārakzay [mʊ.wäm.mád̪ ʔäj.júːb xɑːn, mo̞.ɦäm.mád̪ ʔäj.júːb xɑːn]) (1857 – 7 April 1914) nicknamed the Victor of Maiwand, and as the Afghan Prince Charlie was, for a while, the governor of Herat Province in the Emirate of Afghanistan. He was briefly the Emir of Afghanistan, from 12 October 1879 to 31 May 1880. He also led the Afghan troops during the Second Anglo-Afghan War and defeated the British Indian Army at the Battle of Maiwand. Following his defeat at the Battle of Kandahar, Ayub Khan was deposed and exiled to British India. However, Ayub Khan fled to Persia (now Iran). After negotiations in 1888 with Sir Mortimer Durand, the United Kingdom's ambassador at Tehran, Ayub Khan became a pensioner of the British Raj and traveled to British India in 1888, where he lived in Lahore, Punjab, until his death in 1914. He was buried in Peshawar and had eleven wives, fifteen sons, and ten daughters. Two of his grandsons, Sardar Hissam Mahmud el-Effendi and Sardar Muhammad Ismail Khan, served as brigadiers in the Pakistan Army.

In Afghanistan, he is remembered as the "National Hero of Afghanistan."

== Early life ==
Khan was born into a Pashtun family. His father was Sher Ali Khan and his mother was Qamar Jan, the daughter of an influential Mohmand chief of Lalpura, Saadat Khan. His full-brother was Mohammad Yaqub Khan.

== Second Anglo-Afghan war ==
During the second Anglo-Afghan war, Afghans under the command of Ayub Khan clashed with Anglo-Indian troops at Maiwand on 27 July 1880 and emerged victorious. The Afghan victory at Maiwand was strategically significant for Afghanistan as it saved the country from getting dismembered by Britain, and saved Kandahar from a permanent British occupation. The defeat at Maiwand also compelled the British to withdraw from Kandahar. After the battle, the Afghans buried the dead Anglo-Indian soldiers and erected a monument in their honor and memory.

Ayub Khan later went on to besiege the better equipped British forces at Kandahar but did not succeed. On 1 September 1880, he was defeated and routed by forces led by General Frederick Roberts at the Battle of Kandahar, which saw the end of the Second Anglo-Afghan War.

== After second Anglo-Afghan war ==
According to Forbes, Ayub Khan did not quietly accept the arrangement that placed Kandahar under Amir Abdur Rahman Khan's control. Despite significant challenges, including a shortage of funds and rebellious troops, Ayub Khan set out for Kandahar in July 1881. Mohammad Hassan Khan, appointed by Amir Abdur Rahman Khan as Kandahar's governor following the withdrawal of British forces after the second Anglo-Afghan war, advanced from Kandahar to confront him. A battle ensued at Maiwand, coinciding with the anniversary of Brigadier-General Burrows' defeat on the same location. Ayub Khan emerged victorious, seized the capital, and briefly ruled the province for the first time. However, Amir Abdur Rahman Khan, bolstered by British financial and military support, swiftly advanced from Kabul, confronted Ayub Khan outside Kandahar, and delivered a decisive defeat.

He escaped to Persia (now Iran). After negotiations in 1888 with Sir Mortimer Durand, the ambassador at Tehran, Ayub Khan became a pensioner of the British Raj. A political officer, William Evans-Gordon, took charge of him on his arrival in India and escorted him with his entourage from Karachi to Rawalpindi. He lived in India until his death in 1914.

== Death ==
He died in Lahore in 1914 and is buried in Peshawar near the shrine of Sheikh Habib at Durrani graveyard in Peshawar, Pakistan.

=== Legacy ===
In Afghanistan, he is remembered as the "National Hero of Afghanistan." He had eleven wives, fifteen sons, and ten daughters. Several of his descendants have served in various capacities in Pakistan. Two of his grandsons, Sardar Hissam Mahmud el-Effendi and Sardar Muhammad Ismail Khan, served with the rank of Brigadier in the Pakistan Army.

==== Sardar Mohammad Afzal Khan ====
Sardar Mohammad Afzal Khan was born in Lahore, on 19 October 1911, as a grandson of Ayub Khan. He was the eldest son of Sardar Mohammad Akram Khan. In 1941, he obtained an emergency commission and was posted to 1/2 Punjabi's. In July 1942, he fought in the First Battle of El Alamein and was awarded the Military Cross, as he "…led his company through heavy artillery and machine gun fire, with the enemy tanks in the vicinity, to secure an important ridge to the west of Point-63." After his retirement, he became the Director of Administration for CENTO, in Ankara, and then emigrated to England. He married Zara, the daughter of Sardar Abdul Rahman Khan, and had three sons and a daughter, Haroon, Mahguli, Ayub and Akram,

==== Sardar Hissam Mahmud el-Effendi ====
Sardar Hissam Mahmud el-Effendi was a grandson of Ayub Khan. He was the son of Sardar Muhammad Abdul Qadir Khan el-Effendi (born in Iraq, 1888 and died in 1976), the first son of Ayub Khan. He completed his education at Rashtriya Indian Military College in Dehra Dun, British India and was commissioned as second lieutenant on 15 July 1939 in the British Indian Army. He fought in World War II and was initially posted in North Africa. El-Effendi was captured when his 11th Prince Albert Victor's Own Cavalry (PAVO) was overrun by German Afrika Korps, but managed to escape and rejoin his regiment. Later, he fought in the Burma Campaign. Following the independence of Pakistan, Hissam Mahmud el-Effendi opted to join Pakistan and served as a Brigadier in Pakistan Army. He died in 1985. After retiring from the military, he became a polo player and organised Pakistani polo for over twenty years, with leading teams invited to play from abroad. He died in August 1983 in Lahore, and had two sons. One of his sons, Sardar Azmarai Javaid Hissam el-Effendi, was a professional polo player. He also coached the Pakistani polo team from 2003 to 2007 and was awarded Tamgha-e-Imtiaz in 1996 by the government of Pakistan.

==== Majda & Hamida Sarwar ====
Majda and Hamida Sarwar were born in Allahabad as the granddaughters of Ayub Khan, through his son, Sarwar Khan. They both lived on a pension. The elder sister received an army pension of her husband's whereas the younger sister, Hamida lived off an allowance of Rs. 800 after her father and mother died (in 1983 and 1987, respectively). Their father was a political pensioner and was given money from the Government of India.

== Notes ==
Regnal titles
Preceded by Yaqub Khan	Barakzai dynasty Emir of Afghanistan; 12 October 1879 – 31 May 1880	Succeeded by Abdur Rahman Khan
