= George Burrows (Indian Army officer) =

British Indian Army general

- Born: 1827
- Died: 1917 (aged 89–90)
- Military career
- Allegiance: United Kingdom
- Branch: British Indian Army
- Rank: Brigadier General
- Conflicts: Second Anglo-Afghan War

Brigadier General George Reynolds Scott Burrows (1827–1917) was the commander of the British and Indian forces in the disastrous Battle of Maiwand during the Second Anglo-Afghan War. Although his tactics received criticism, he was exonerated and later promoted.
