= Military career of Hubert Gough (1914–1915) =

British Army officer

Sir Hubert de la Poer Gough
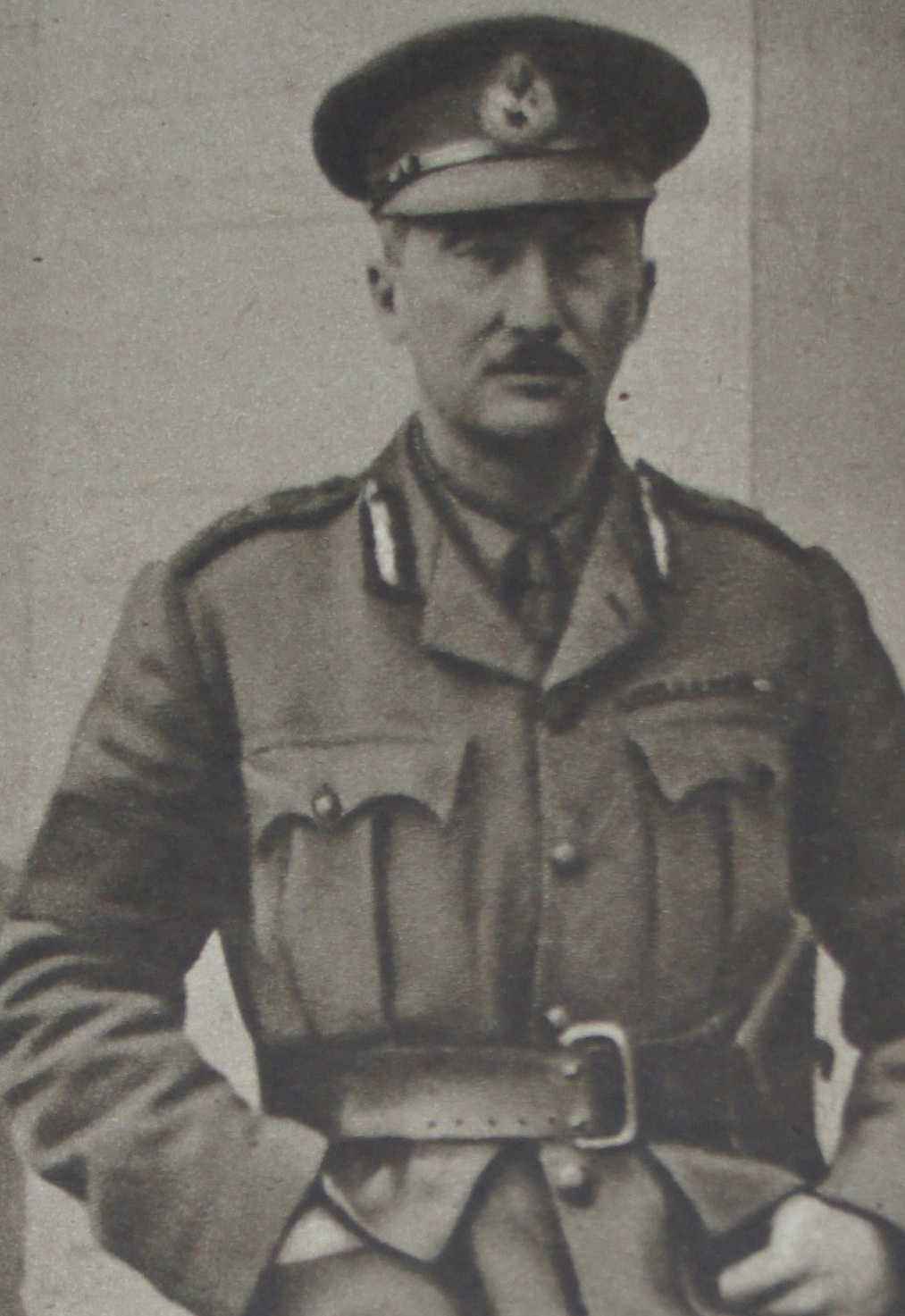
- Hubert Gough in 1917
- Born: 12 August 1870; London, England
- Died: 18 March 1963 (aged 92); London, England
- Burial place: Camberley, Surrey, England
- Relatives: Sir Charles Gough (father); Sir Hugh Gough (uncle); Sir John Gough (brother)
- Military career
- Allegiance: United Kingdom
- Branch: British Army
- Service years: 1888–1922
- Rank: General
- Commands: Fifth Army; I Corps; 7th Division; 3rd Cavalry Brigade; 16th (Queen's) Lancers
- Conflicts: Tirah Campaign; Second Boer War; Siege of Ladysmith; Relief of Ladysmith; First World War; Battle of Loos; Battle of the Somme; Third Battle of Ypres; Operation Michael
- Awards: Knight Grand Cross of the Order of the Bath; Knight Grand Cross of the Order of St Michael and St George; Knight Commander of the Royal Victorian Order

General Sir Hubert de la Poer Gough GCB, GCMG, KCVO (/ɡɒf/ GOF; 12 August 1870 – 18 March 1963) was a senior officer in the British Army in the First World War. A controversial figure, he was a favourite of Field Marshal Sir Douglas Haig (Commander-in-Chief of the British Expeditionary Force (BEF) on the Western Front 1916-18), and the youngest of his Army commanders.

Gough experienced a meteoric rise during the first two years of the First World War. He commanded his 3rd Cavalry Brigade in August 1914 at the Battle of Mons and the Battle of Le Cateau. After operating in a somewhat semi-detached fashion from his division commander Edmund Allenby, his force was built up into an independent unit, initially called "Gough's Command" and soon reconstituted as the new 2nd Cavalry Division. His division fought dismounted at the First Battle of Ypres. Gough then commanded the 7th Infantry Division at the Battle of Aubers Ridge in spring 1915. He commanded I Corps at the Battle of Loos in the autumn of 1915, and was one of the senior officers who criticised Sir John French to King George V, contributing to the former's enforced resignation as Commander-in-Chief of the BEF.

== Early war ==
=== Cavalry brigade: Mons to the Marne ===
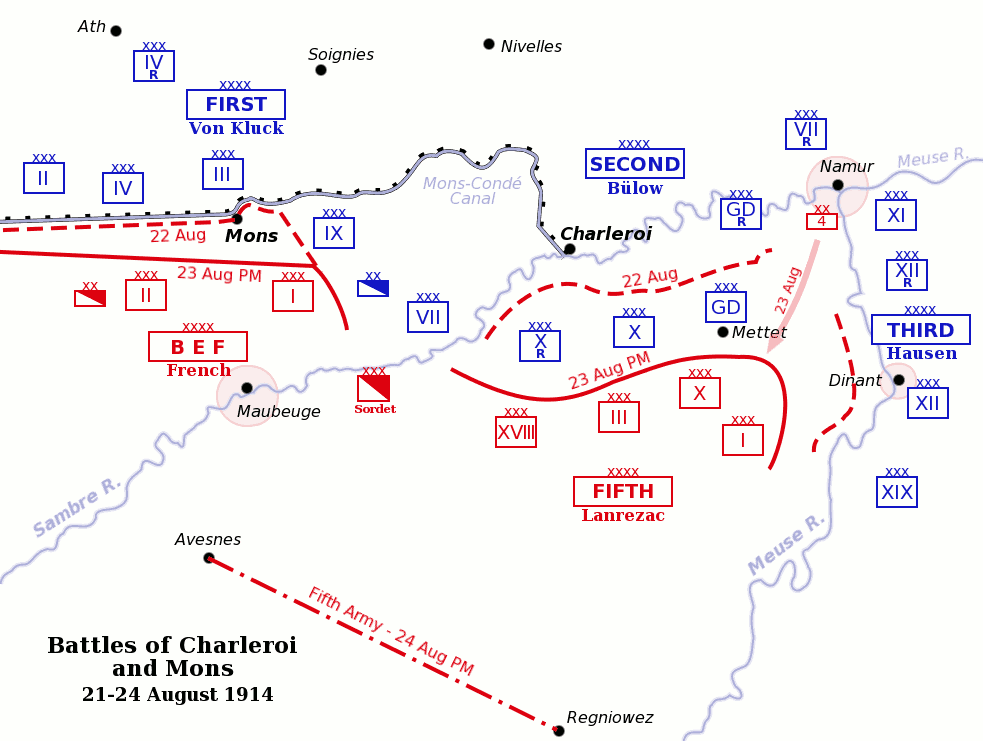
Disposition of Allied and German forces at Mons and Charleroi, 22–23 August

At the outbreak of war in August 1914, Gough took the 3rd Cavalry Brigade to France, under the command of Allenby (GOC Cavalry Division). They embarked between 14 and 16 August, and shipped directly from Ireland to Le Havre, before travelling by train to Maubeuge. Active operations began on 21 August, and the brigade saw action on 22 August, on which day an artillery battery under Gough's command was the first British battery in France to open fire on the Germans. During the Battle of Mons (23 August) Gough's brigade, along with three of the other British cavalry brigades, was on the left flank (the 5th was on the right, maintaining contact with Lanrezac's Fifth Army).

During the following days Gough detached himself from Allenby's command and linked up with Haig's I Corps on the BEF's right. Gough's version of events was that he had become dissatisfied with Allenby on 24 August after his retreat exposed Fergusson’s 5th Infantry Division to German attack on its left flank, requiring 2nd Cavalry Brigade to mount a charge and Gough's 3rd Brigade, which was to have been the rearguard, to fight dismounted. After the Germans fell back, Gough was able to resume the planned retreat, only to find that Allenby had sent the division transport, containing food, ammunition and maps, far into the rear. Gough later claimed (in The Fifth Army) that Allenby had been "mesmerised" by the enemy during an engagement at Solesmes on 25 August. Gough may also have been panicking, telling another officer that the British were "surrounded" and that the Germans were already in Amiens – southwest of the BEF's present position. Allenby publicly laughed this episode off as "only Gough's little way" but was privately furious both at Gough's behaviour and at the way it was tolerated by Haig and Sir John French (Commander-in-Chief of the BEF). Relations between Allenby and Gough were strained thereafter.

During the Battle of Le Cateau (26 August) part of Gough's brigade again assisted 5th Infantry Division. After the battle, lacking orders or information, he managed to make contact with Wilson (sub chief of staff, BEF) on the civilian telephone system, who told him – by Gough's account – "As you are on the spot, do as you like, old boy." On 27 August, near St Quentin, Gough managed to obtain some maps from an Army Service Corps officer who happened to be driving past, and managed – again using the civilian telephone system – to make contact with the corps commanders Haig and Horace Smith-Dorrien. On 28 August he sent a message to GHQ stating that he had lost contact with Division HQ (ie. Allenby) and had received no orders for 4 days, but although he asked for orders from GHQ he received none. On 29 August the brigade heard the artillery of the Battle of Guise in the far distance. By 1 September they were at Villers-Cotterêts, south of the Aisne, after a retreat of 180 miles (100 miles as the crow flies), and at last linked up with Haig's I Corps, assisting a rearguard of Irish Guards in the last major action of the retreat. The retreat ended south of the Marne on 5 September and Gough for the first time linked up with British transport and supplies.

By the time of the Battle of the Marne 3rd and 5th Cavalry Brigades had been formed into "Gough's Command", an ad hoc cavalry force separate from Allenby's Cavalry Division. One man wrote: "It was all push, push, push with Goughie. But he was pushing the enemy as much as he was pushing us." Gough advanced to the Aisne on 12 September, although owing to Sir John French's having failed to organise ad hoc advance guards there was neither artillery to harass the Germans nor engineers to repair the bridges, which had been blown only an hour previously.

=== Cavalry division ===
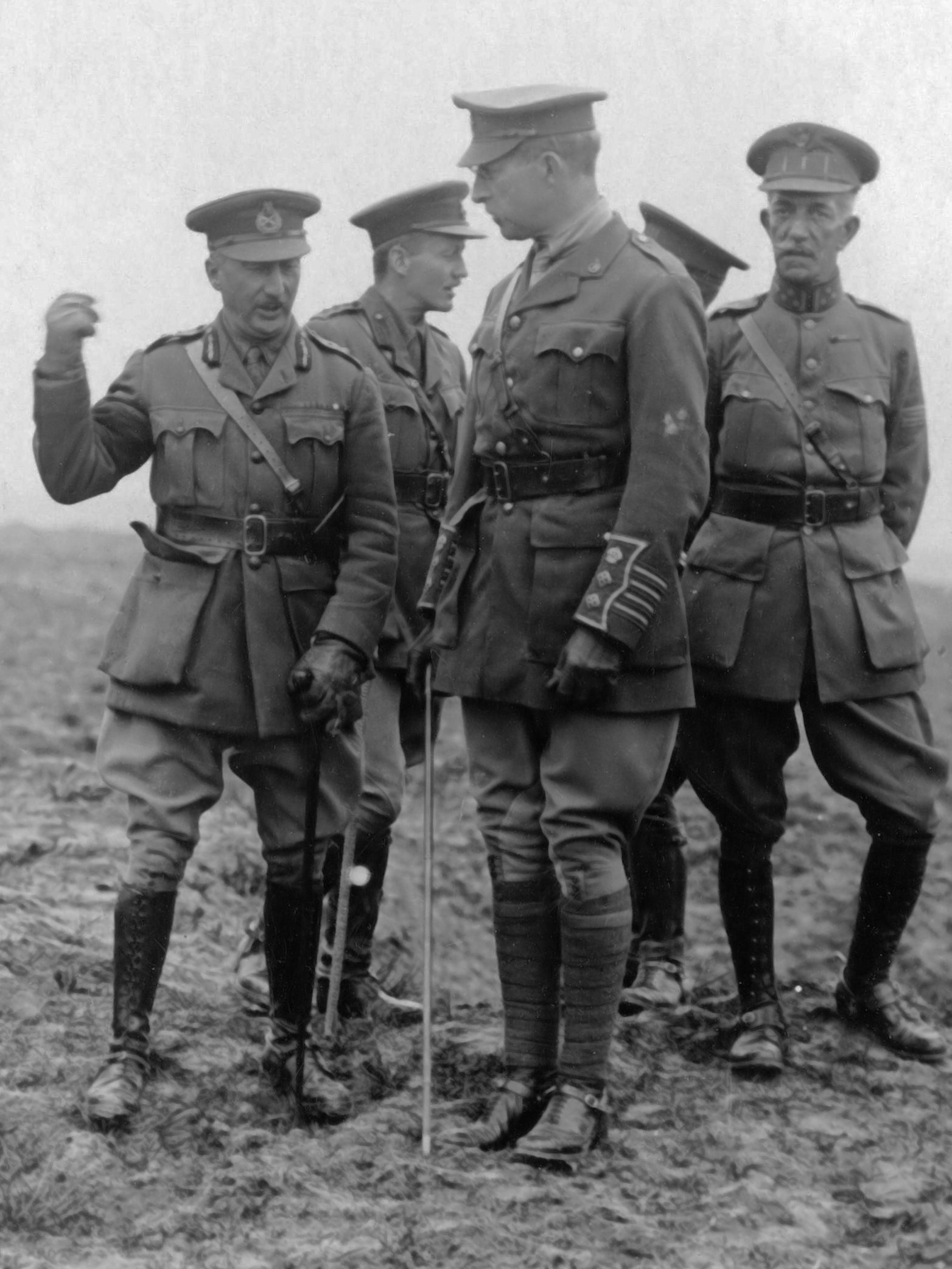
Hubert Gough (left) and King Albert I of the Belgians

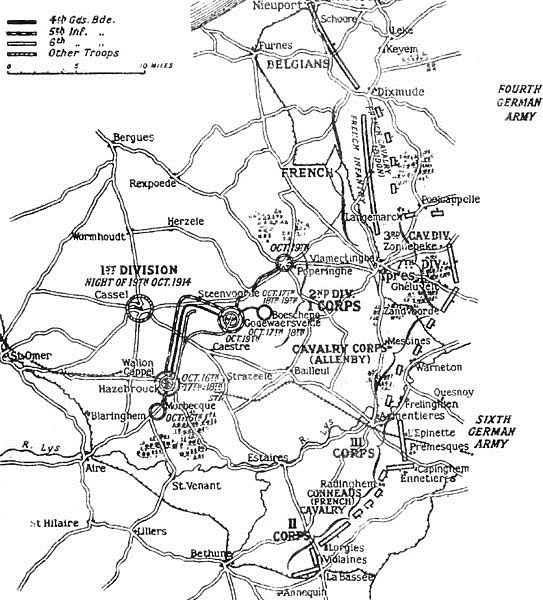
First Battle of Ypres

On 15 September Gough's Command, with the addition of supporting troops, was formed into 2nd Cavalry Division and he was appointed GOC on 16 September. The two cavalry divisions, now being redeployed by train to Belgium, were formed into a Cavalry Corps under Allenby (9 September), and reached the Belgian border on 11 September.

2nd Cavalry Division was the western flank of the BEF, and after capturing Mont des Cats (12 October) and after interviews with prisoners, Gough believed that he had a chance to turn the German west flank. He gave verbal orders (13 October) to capture Mount Kemmel (also southwest of Ypres) and to cross the Lys southeast of Ypres, but was forbidden to advance further by Allenby. The staff officer Philip Howell wrote to his wife at this time that Gough was "like a cat on hot bricks" (14 October 1914). On 14 October Gough linked up with Rawlinson's IV Corps (Byng's 3rd Cavalry Division and Thompson Capper's 7th Infantry Division) which were moving down from the coast – as there was no longer any danger of being cut off Gough ordered his division to advance, while Allenby (15 October) at last persuaded Sir John French to try to take Lille and turn the German west flank – instead they clashed with new forces being brought up by Erich von Falkenhayn (the new German Chief of Staff).

On 16 and 17 October Gough's attempts to cross the Lys were beaten back by German forces Entrenchment began on 20 October – local workers had to be rounded up, as British cavalry were not equipped with entrenching tools. Gough's division, sometimes with as few as 2,000 officers and men in the front line, was defending an area around Messines and Wytschaete. At one point he had to gallop to the front lines to order certain regiments to hold their positions – this had been caused by confused staff work, in which Gough's orders to draw up "contingency plans" for retreat had been misunderstood.

Gough was promoted major-general on 26 October 1914. The promotion was backdated to 15 September, the date on which his division had been formed. During this period Gough formed the practice of rotating units through the front lines as quickly as possible, to avoid any single unit being damaged beyond the point of effectiveness, and of holding the front lines thinly to maintain the largest possible reserve. On 27 October Gough offered some of his reserves to Haig's I Corps (he made the offer privately to his brother Johnnie, Haig's chief of staff at the time), but this was countermanded by Allenby.

At 11.30am on 29 October Gough was able to send 5 squadrons out of his reserve to assist Byng's cavalry division. On 30 October, 31 October and the following night Gough's division (3,250 officers and men, assisted by two companies of Baluchis, Wilde's Rifles (an Indian battalion) and the London Scottish territorial battalion) was strongly attacked from the south-east by German forces under von Fabeck, who were trying to capture Messines-Wytschaete Ridge. He held off the assault, assisted by a cavalry charge by Chetwode's 5th Cavalry Brigade to his north and a counterattack by two battalions of Allenby's corps reserve to his south-west. He later reflected that he served his "apprenticeship in India and during the Boer War" but that at First Ypres "the Germans gave me my trade test."

Gough's Division returned to the front line at Hooge, near Ypres, on 12 February. On 13 February he was offered a command in the expedition intended for Salonika (in the event these troops were sent to Gallipoli) but declined after consulting his brother and BEF Chief of Staff "Wully" Robertson. Johnnie Gough was wounded and died later in February. Haig, a shy man, liked Gough for his wit and open personality, and to some extent he replaced his dead brother as Haig's confidant. Haig specifically asked (10 March 1915) for Gough to be attached to his forces in case he succeeded in "breaking the enemy line" at Neuve Chapelle (10–13 March). In the event, Gough's division was in GHQ Reserve (ie. reporting to Haig's Army HQ rather than to c corps commander) for the battle. Philip Howell wrote to his wife that Gough liked "to fight with everyone above him as well as with the Boches" (19 March 1915).

=== Infantry division ===
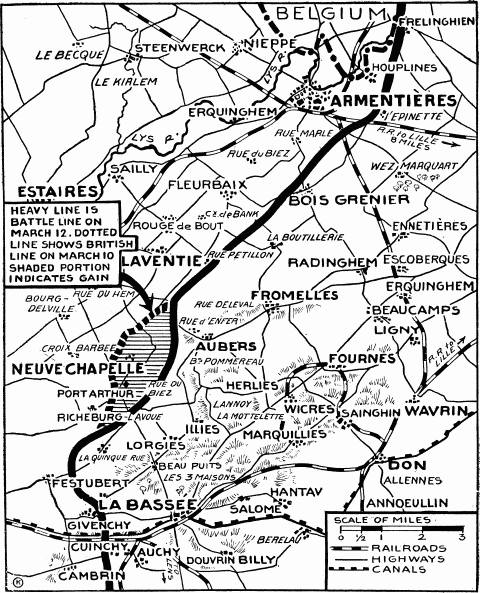
Neuve Chapelle/Aubers Ridge sector, March–April 1915

Gough was appointed GOC of the 7th Division on 18 April 1915, after its previous commander, Thompson Capper, had been wounded. The division was part of Rawlinson's IV Corps, itself part of Haig's First Army; on giving him his new appointment, Haig informed him (Haig diary 18 April 1915) about how Rawlinson had attempted to have Joey Davies sacked from command of 8th Division after Neuve Chapelle and how Davies and his staff did not trust Rawlinson. Gough may have been appointed as a counterbalance to Rawlinson, with whom Haig had a wary relationship. Gough and his division were in reserve at Second Ypres (22 April).

Gough commanded 7th Division at the Battle of Aubers Ridge in May. 7th Division was in corps reserve on 9 May, and that night was ordered to relieve 8th Division in the line, ready to renew the attack the next day. After protests from the brigadiers that this was impractical (the support trenches were full of men – some alive, some wounded and some dead – while front line units were still reorganising and recovering their wounded) Gough cancelled the relief on his own authority as "the man on the spot". He expected to be disciplined by Rawlinson, but instead his division was redeployed to the sector of Monro's I Corps, where diversionary attacks were to be mounted to assist the French.

Monro gave Gough great leeway to plan his own attack after consulting with officers who had been involved in the attack on that sector on 9 May. Gough and his artillery officer "Curly" Birch devised a plan for a few minutes’ bombardment, leaving a gap to tempt the Germans out of their shelters (as a double bluff the bombardment was to be repeated several times in preceding days), while bringing some guns forward on muffled wheels to take the Germans by surprise. The assault began at 3:15 am on 16 May. The right of Gough's 7th Division (1st Royal Welch Fusiliers and 2nd Queens) was the only part of I Corps attack to succeed. The attack was renewed the next day after assistance from almost every First Army gun in range, but was unable to make much further progress. On 19 May 7th Division was withdrawn from the line, handing over its sector to the Canadian Division.

After Aubers Ridge a captain described Gough as "a little man, very smart and keen looking. He spent about 15 minutes with my company and spoke very easily to the soldiers ... he made us all laugh at the end and feel very cheery."

At the end of June Gough returned home and was awarded the CB for his services in August and September 1914.

== Corps commander: Loos ==
=== Planning ===
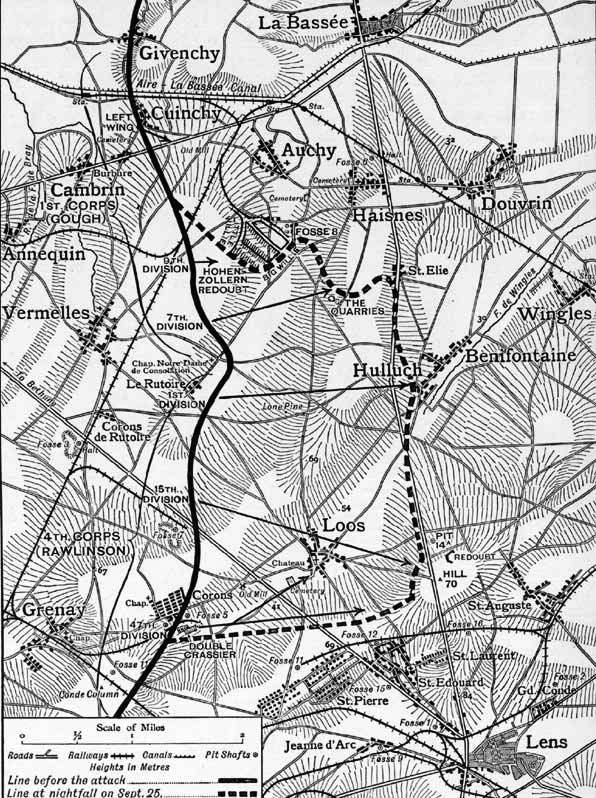
Battle of Loos, September 1915

With Capper now recovered and keen to resume command of 7th Division, and Monro being promoted to command the new Third Army, Gough was promoted to Monro's previous job as GOC I Corps (2nd, 7th and later also 9th Division), still part of Haig's First Army, and promoted temporary lieutenant-general on 13 July 1915. Gough's practice of visiting front-line units irritated Horne of 2nd Division and Capper, who felt that this was a threat to his own renewed authority over 7th Division.

Gough, along with the other corps commanders of First Army, was present at a meeting with Kitchener (Secretary of State for War) on 19 August. After Kitchener had argued that there would be enough "exceptions" to make conscription administratively difficult, Gough, by his own account, "flared up" and declared that it was needed, while Haig urged Kitchener to put his weight behind its introduction (Haig omitted the latter points from his own diary account of the meeting).

At a meeting with his corps commanders (13 August) Haig asked Gough to draw up plans to take the Hohenzollern Redoubt, while Rawlinson was to take Loos and possibly Hill 70. Gough (22 August) proposed that 9th Scottish Division should "rush" the German positions on his left (Hohenzollern Redoubt, Fosse 8) just before dawn (4 am) after a barrage and gas attack, while the following night 7th Division would push through the Quarries to Citie St Elie. Haig recorded (1 September 1915) how "active and energetic" Gough and the artillery officer Noel Birch were, and insisted that Rawlinson (who proposed a limited stage-by-stage operation) also use gas for his initial attack. Gough would later (The Fifth Army p. 101) call gas "a boomerang ally" Gough later wrote that he had been dismayed at the lack of guns and ammunition. Neither Gough nor Rawlinson's corps had any divisions in reserve – in Gough's case only one brigade from each of his three divisions.

Haig met Rawlinson and Gough again (16 September) and ordered them to draw up plans to attack if necessary without the use of gas. Gough proposed (17 September 1915) that the attack of 2nd Division be abandoned but wrote that "a moderately good chance of success if there is an element of surprise ... this attack, by its suddenness and the size of the force employed, is aimed at capturing the enemy's second line, viz. Hulluch-Staelie-Haisnes, in practically one rush." He also offered a more cautious Plan B, for an attack over the course of two to seven days, with diversionary artillery attacks followed by sequential attacks by 9th and 7th divisions. Haig used these, and Rawlinson's similar proposals, to lobby GHQ for the attack he wanted.

=== Initial attacks ===
On 25 September the order came down to release the gas, despite the wind being unfavourable (i.e. likely to blow it back over British troops). Although Edmonds and B. H. Liddell Hart blamed Captain Ernest Gold (meteorological officer) and Maj-Gen Horne (GOC 2nd Division), Foulkes (the gas officer) later hinted that "still higher authority" may have been responsible, and a gas officer Lt Sewill recorded being told that the order came from Corps – i.e. Gough. At 5:20 am Gough had advised Haig that it was too late to cancel the gas release. However, Nick Lloyd blames Haig for drawing up such an inflexible plan, dependent on gas, in the first place. Gough had already angered officers of 9th Division by micro-managing brigade orders.

On Gough's left Horne's 2nd Division met with heavy losses, the CO of 1st Middlesex recording that the attacking waves "were all shot down within ten minutes". On Gough's right 7th Division captured the enemy first line, albeit with heavy loss.

In Gough's centre 26th Brigade, part of 9th Division, captured Hohenzollern Redoubt, but 28 Brigade were repulsed on the left. Gough was away from his headquarters for two hours that morning as he tried to discover why 28 Brigade were not making progress. Shortly after 9:10 am, just after 28 Brigade reports had reached division HQ, orders came from Corps to renew the assault at midday. The GOC, Major-General G. H. Thesiger, made clear that the orders came from Gough and "dissociated" himself from them. The bombardment was from 11:30 am to 12 noon as planned, but orders only reached the two forward battalions just before noon, forcing the men to attack at 12:15 pm after very little preparation, suffering predictable loss from a prepared enemy. Gough made little mention of this episode in his memoirs, while the divisional history (1921) was scathing about "forlorn hope", "an offence against a well-understood military principle", "futile", "an almost unbelievable optimism" and commented that "the persistence in a frontal attack showed a serious lack of flexibility in the Higher Command in making use of the division". Nick Lloyd argues that Gough was far too influenced by the initial favourable reports, and that his behaviour displayed the aggression and impatience for which he was later to become notorious. Thesiger was relatively new to his post, unlike Horne (2nd Division) who was an experienced commander on ground where little progress had been expected anyway.

Gough had at first ordered his divisions to commit their reserve brigades, but later in the day, when it became clear that the attack had been less successful than hoped, withdrew all three reserve brigades to form a corps reserve. On 26 September Gough was ordered to renew his attack towards Citie St Elie, but during the night a German counterattack had retaken the Quarries off tired British troops, and instead they had to stabilise their position along the former German front line (Gough later recorded "fresh anxieties").

On 26 September Gough sacked Brigadier-General W. A. Oswald, GOC of 73 Brigade, part of 24th Division, as it was moving up to the front. There is little evidence to support a later claim that Oswald had "broken down mentally"; rather, Gough was concerned that the brigade might not hold its position around Fosse 8 against German counterattacks. Although Gough later acquired a reputation as a ruthless sacker of officers, he seldom did so while they were in action, and his dislike of Indian Army officers and elderly "dugouts" (retired officers recalled to service – Oswald was both) may have played a role. A hasty attack by 64 Brigade (part of 21st Division) at 1:45 pm that day, after an excited message from a junior staff officer, is also witness to the fear of sacking under which brigadiers worked.

I Corps refusal to feed through reserve units on 26 September caused these attacks to die out.

=== Subsequent attacks ===
Haig, just informed of Thesiger's death, visited Gough at 2:15 pm on 27 September. Gough recorded that Haig was "visibly worried", "sharp" and "cross", and Gough later admitted that he may have passed some of this behaviour down to his subordinates.

Although Fosse 8 had been lost to a German counterattack on 27 September, 73 Brigade had been able to establish a position on the east face of Hohenzollern Redoubt. Another week of fighting ensued as First Army fed in reinforcements to stop further German progress and retake ground. Maj-Gen Edward Bulfin (GOC 28th Division, initially held in Army Reserve at the start of the battle) was deployed here between 27 September and 5 October, and attempted to retake Fosse 8. Bulfin told the Official Historian (in 1927) "I have a very confused memory of Loos – a sort of horrid nightmare. I was under Hugh (sic) Gough – and I never want to serve under him again. I remember he ordered me to attack a Fosse – and of course the whole thing was hopeless." His subordinate Brig-Gen Pereira (85 Brigade), who met him in England later in October recalled that Gough thought Bulfin slow and constantly ordered attacks without proper artillery support. In his memoirs The Fifth Army Gough recorded that Bulfin was more concerned with lecturing him about how to command a corps (e.g. that "infantry were not cavalry") than with "deal(ing) with the serious problem before his division". As 85 Brigade moved up to the front on 27 September Pereira had been sent frequent messages from division to attack Fosse 8, and one direct from corps (ie. from Gough), ordering "an immediate counterattack across the open". After Pereira had been wounded, Lt-Col Roberts, who had taken command, eventually attacked on the morning of 28 September after repeated orders from corps and division, overruling his protests. One battalion, the 2/Buffs, did not even reach their start position until 10 am, long after the preliminary bombardment had ceased. On 29 September 84 Brigade entered the line and conducted a series of small-scale attacks, often by just two or three companies. It was the same story when 83 Brigade took their place on 3 October.

On 6 October I Corps issued a stinging rebuke to 28th Division. The twelve points included "misleading and inaccurate reports" "want of discipline and soldierly bearing" in one battalion, and the "disgraceful" retreat of another, "great slackness" "too much laisser (sic) faire" although the report also complained that it was not the business of Corps to command the division. In fact 28th Division, who were much criticised by Haig and Gough, had fought hard in wet weather, against strong German resistance, winning two VCs in the process.

=== Ousting of Sir John French ===
Gough began a corps-level inquiry into the lessons of the battle (10 October), which after a discussion with Haig was followed by an Army-level inquiry (20 October). Gough's inquiries after the battle ascertained that British attacks had been stymied by lack of grenades, but had come close to achieving a breakthrough in areas where the wind had carried British chlorine gas over the German lines.

Gough was one of several senior officers invited to correspond with the King to keep him informed of military developments. After the Battle of Loos, with intrigues afoot to remove French from command of the BEF, Gough was one of the senior officers who spoke to Lord Haldane (9 October 1915) and George V (24 October 1915) against French. He told the King "I would not pretend that Sir John was fitted for the responsibilities he had, and the king was surprised by the examples I gave him of the C-in-C's failings" Haig agreed with Gough (14 November) that on his visit to London he should tell Lord Milner about the "faulty working of the military machine in France". French was shortly forced to "resign" as Commander-in-Chief.

=== Military ideas ===
Gough later commented on the draft of the Official History (1926) that a limited attack at Loos would have been more sensible, as it could always have been reinforced if Joffre's offensive succeeded, and was critical of Haig for – as so often – attempting to achieve decisive victory with insufficient means.

Notes from a conference held by Gough on 20 December 1915 indicate that at the time he still thought in terms of the principles of warfare as taught at Staff College: he still expected an "advance guard" to move forward until, after two or three days, a plan had been decided on for deploying the bulk of British forces, whereas in reality, by 1917, the opening day would often prove the most effective of any offensive. Like many British generals of the time, he still blamed the failures of that year on human error in applying the principles of warfare, rather than on the need to concentrate artillery, learn new tactics, and allow senior officers to gain experience.

== Works ==
- Gough, Hubert, The Fifth Army, London: Hodder, 1931
- Gough, Hubert, Soldiering On: Being the memoirs of Sir Hubert Gough, New York: Speller, 1957

Military offices
Preceded by Sir Thompson Capper	GOC 7th Division; April–July 1915	Succeeded by Sir Thompson Capper
Preceded by Charles Monro	GOC I Corps; 1915–1916	Succeeded by Arthur Holland
Preceded by None	GOC-in-C Fifth Army; 1916–1918	Succeeded by William Peyton
Honorary titles
Preceded by Edmund Allenby, 1st Viscount Allenby	Colonel of the 16th/5th Lancers; 1936–1943	Succeeded by Henry Cecil Lloyd Howard
