= Early life and career of Hubert Gough (1870–1914) =

Sir Hubert de la Poer Gough
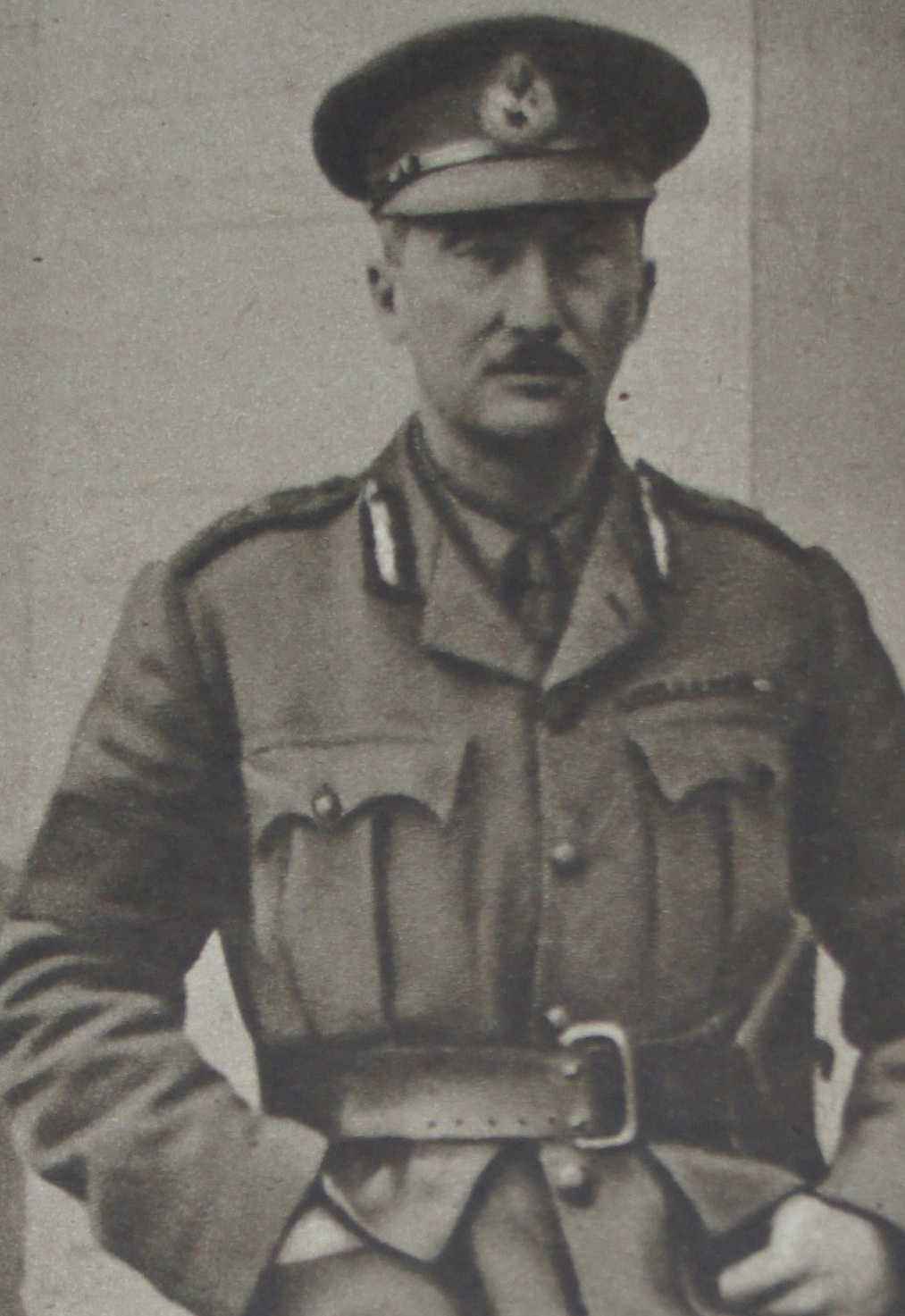
- Hubert Gough in 1917
- Born: 12 August 1870; London, England
- Died: 18 March 1963 (aged 92); London, England
- Burial place: Camberley, Surrey, England
- Relatives: Sir Charles Gough (father); Sir Hugh Gough (uncle); Sir John Gough (brother)
- Military career
- Allegiance: United Kingdom
- Branch: British Army
- Service years: 1888–1922
- Rank: General
- Commands: Fifth Army; I Corps; 7th Division; 3rd Cavalry Brigade; 16th (Queen's) Lancers
- Conflicts: Tirah Campaign; Second Boer War: Siege of Ladysmith; Relief of Ladysmith; First World War: Battle of Loos; Battle of the Somme; Third Battle of Ypres; Operation Michael
- Awards: Knight Grand Cross of the Order of the Bath; Knight Grand Cross of the Order of St Michael and St George; Knight Commander of the Royal Victorian Order

General Sir Hubert de la Poer Gough GCB, GCMG, KCVO (/ɡɒf/ GOF; 12 August 1870 – 18 March 1963) was a senior officer in the British Army in World War I. A controversial figure, he was a favourite of the Commander-in-Chief of the British Expeditionary Force (BEF) on the Western Front, Field Marshal Sir Douglas Haig, and the youngest of his Army commanders.

Gough was educated at Eton and the Royal Military College, Sandhurst, before commissioning into the 16th Lancers in 1889. He served on the North-West Frontier of British India, before attending Staff College at Camberley. Before completing the course he was sent to serve in the Second Boer War, where he commanded a small Composite Regiment consisting of various units of Light Horse and Mounted Infantry, fighting with Redvers Buller's forces in Natal. During the later guerrilla war phase of the war he was briefly taken prisoner by the Boers in November 1901, but escaped.

After being invalided back to Britain with a wounded hand Gough reverted briefly to his substantive rank of captain and missed out of a staff posting as he had hoped in vain for a return to the war, then in its final months. However he soon resumed steady promotion and became a brigade-major, then an instructor at Staff College, then commanding officer of the 16th Lancers.

By 1914 he was an acting brigadier-general, and General Officer Commanding of the 3rd Cavalry Brigade at the Curragh in Ireland. During the Curragh Incident of March 1914 he was one of the leading officers who threatened to accept dismissal rather than deploy into Protestant Ulster. As one of the ringleaders he was summoned to London to explain himself, and along with his brother Johnny (a brigadier-general at Aldershot) he insisted on an assurance in writing from J.E.B. Seely (Secretary of State for War) and Sir John French (Chief of the Imperial General Staff) that the Army would not be used to coerce Protestant Ulster into a Home Rule Ireland. Seely and French were forced to resign for signing the document without Cabinet authority.

== Family background and early life ==
Gough's ancestors were clerics and clerks in Wiltshire, and the family settled in Ireland in the early 17th century, not as planters but in clerical positions. By the nineteenth century they were an Anglo-Irish family of landed gentry settled at Gurteen, County Waterford, Ireland. Gough described himself as "Irish by blood and upbringing".

Gough was the eldest son of General Sir Charles J. S. Gough, VC, GCB, a nephew of General Sir Hugh H. Gough, VC, and a brother of Brigadier General Sir John Edmund Gough, VC. The Goughs are the only family to have won the Victoria Cross, the highest British award for bravery, three times. Hubert's mother was Harriette Anastasia de la Poer, a daughter of John William Poer, styled 17th Baron de la Poer, of Gurteen, County Waterford, formerly Member of Parliament for the County Waterford constituency. Gough's mother was brought up as a Roman Catholic, although her mother was a Protestant.

Gough was born in London on 12 August 1870. As an infant he went out to India with his family late in 1870, and his brother John was born there in 1871, but in 1877 the boys and their mother were sent back to England, while their father was on active service in the Second Afghan War; a younger brother and sister died of scarlet fever at this time. Gough's mother returned to India when he was ten, leaving the boys at a boarding school, and Gough did not meet his father again until he was sixteen.

Gough was educated at Eton College. According to his autobiography Soldiering On, he was terrible at Latin, but good at sports such as football and rugby.

== Early career ==
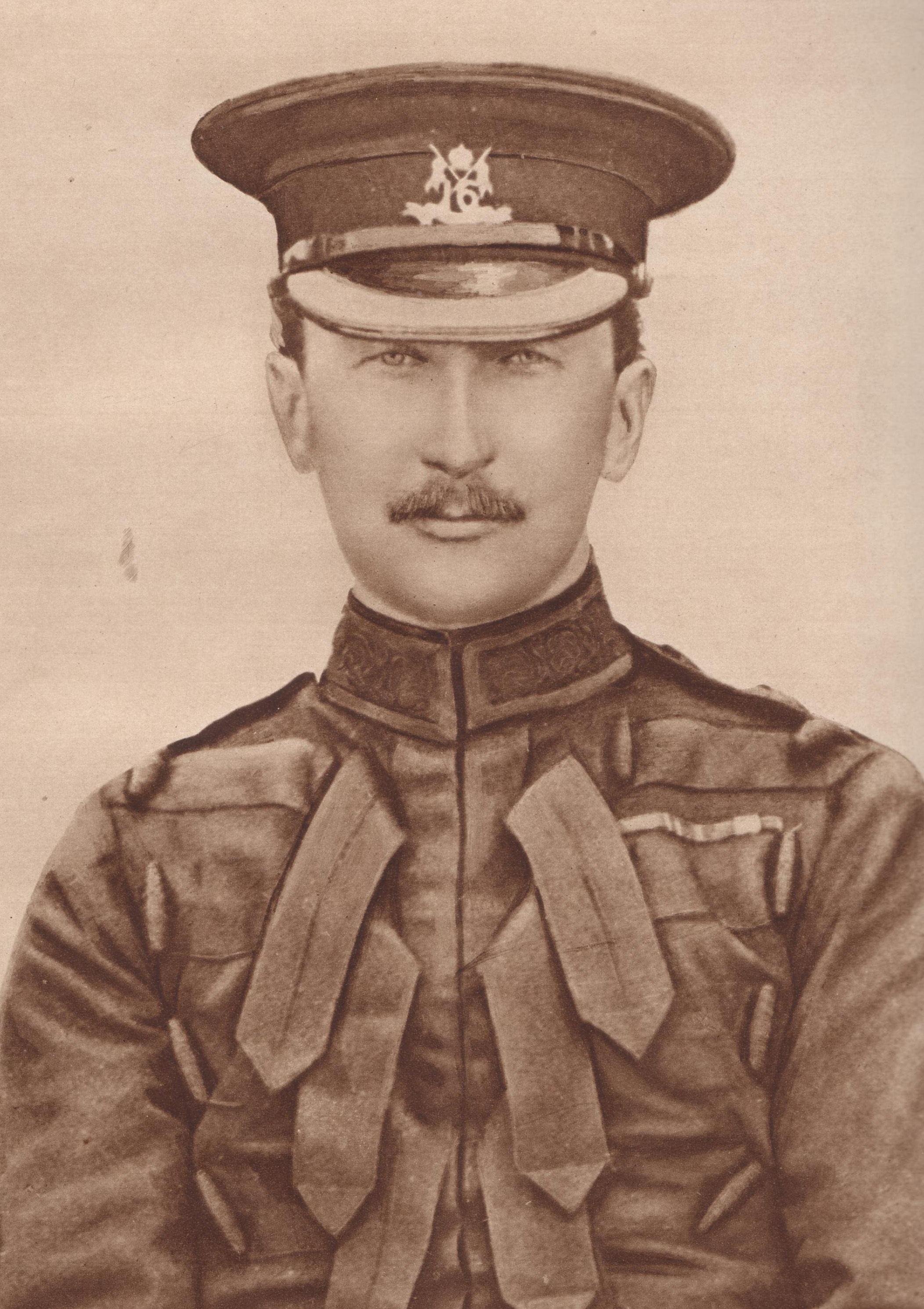
Gough as a junior officer

After leaving Eton, Gough gained entrance to the Royal Military College, Sandhurst in 1888. He was gazetted into the 16th Lancers as a second lieutenant on 5 March 1889. Although not particularly wealthy compared to other cavalry officers – he had a parental allowance of £360 a year on top of his official salary of just over £121 – he distinguished himself as a rider, winning the Regimental Cup, and as a polo player. Many of his horses were provided for him by other officers.

Gough was promoted to lieutenant on 23 July 1890, and his regiment sailed for Bombay in September 1890, travelling by train to Lucknow. During the winter of 1893–94 he briefly acted in command of a squadron while other officers were on leave. He was promoted captain on 22 December 1894 at the relatively early age of 24.

He served with the Tirah Field Force 1897–98. He was posted to the Northwest Frontier, initially to the garrison holding the entrance to the Khyber Pass at Jamrud. His patron Colonel Neville Chamberlain managed to obtain for him a posting as assistant commissariat officer in Major-General Alfred Gaselee's brigade.

Gough returned to England in June 1898, and sat the Staff College exam in August. He was hospitalised with malaria in the autumn, then married Margaret Louisa Nora Lewes (known as "Daisy") on 22 December 1898 (postponed from April). He married at an unusually early age for a serving officer.

== Boer War ==
Gough started at Staff College, Camberley on 9 January 1899 but did not complete the course. Instead he was ordered on special service to South Africa on 25 October 1899, steaming from Southampton on 28 October and reaching Cape Town on 15 November. He was deployed to Natal, and was initially ordered by Colonel Ian Hamilton to act as instructor to one of the Rifle Associations (locally raised units of volunteer mounted infantry or light cavalry).

Gough then served as ADC to Lord Dundonald, who was commanding mounted troops in Natal. In January 1900 he was promoted to brigade intelligence officer, a role which required a great deal of scouting. In mid-January he was sent to reconnoitre Potgieter's Drift, a crossing of the Tugela River, with a view to outflanking the Boer position at Colenso – which Buller had assaulted in December – from the west in an attempt to relieve Ladysmith. However, slow deployment gave away the British intentions and allowed the Boers time to prepare their defence. During the resulting Battle of Spion Kop (23–24 January) Gough met Winston Churchill, a celebrity after his recent escape from Boer captivity and now relaying messages whilst serving as an officer in the South African Light Horse.

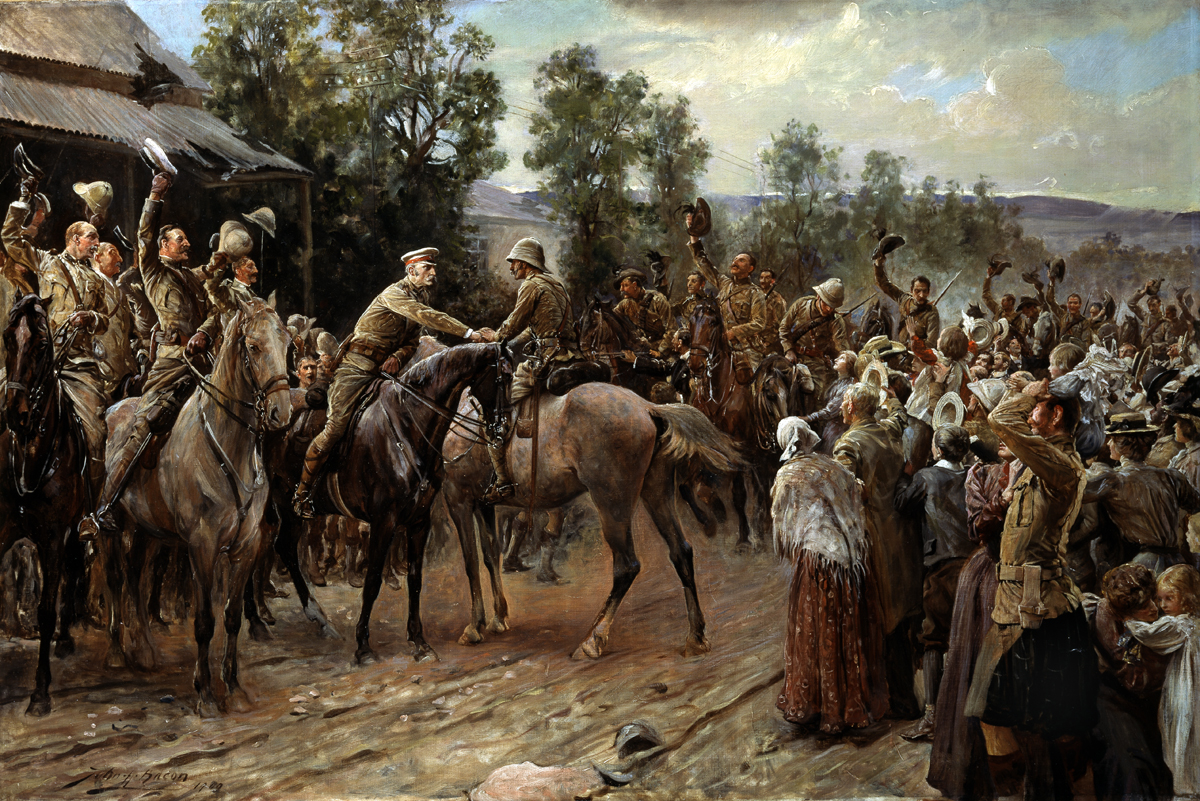
The Relief of Ladysmith. Sir George White greets Lord Douglas Hamilton on 28 February 1900. Painting by John Henry Frederick Bacon.

On 1 February Gough was appointed, as a local unpaid major, CO of a Composite Regiment (a squadron of Imperial Light Horse, a squadron of Natal Carbineers and a company of 60th Rifles Mounted Infantry). He led his regiment to assist Buller's third attempt (5–7 February) to cross the Tugela, and in the fourth attempt (14–27 February). He led the first British troops into Ladysmith (28 February), in defiance of written orders from Dundonald that it was "too dangerous" to proceed, and there met his brother Johnnie who had been besieged inside the town. His meeting with George Stuart White was widely portrayed. In March 1900 the Composite Regiment was reorganised: Gough lost the Natal Carbineers and Imperial Light Horse Squadrons, but received in their place two companies of mounted infantry, one Scots and one Irish. He devoted a great deal of effort to training, both in riding and musketry. From May 1900 Gough's regiment saw active service as Buller pushed into the passes of the Drakenberg Mountains northwest of Ladysmith, eventually linking up with the main British forces under Lord Roberts, who had advanced from the west to capture Bloemfontein, Johannesburg and Pretoria. The conventional phase of the war ended towards the end of 1900.

During the period of guerrilla warfare which followed, Gough's Regiment was gradually reinforced to a strength of 600 men in four companies. Along with Smith-Dorrien and Allenby, he served under the overall command of Lieutenant-General French. Gough was marked for consideration for a brevet lieutenant-colonelcy in late April 1901, although this promotion was not to take effect until he became a substantive major in his own regiment. Major-General Horace Smith-Dorrien wrote to Gough's father praising him and expressing a wish that he could be promoted straightaway. On 17 September 1901 he led the Composite Regiment, after inadequate reconnaissance, to attack what appeared a tempting target of Boers near Blood River Port, only to be taken prisoner with his entire force by larger Boer forces which had been out of sight. After he escaped, Kitchener (the commander-in-chief) expressed his "deepest sympathy", and he may have survived with his reputation largely intact because his overconfidence was in favourable contrast to the timidity which had contributed to other British defeats. To his credit, according to Gary Sheffield, Gough discussed the matter at length in his memoirs Soldiering On. Although preparations were made to restore the Composite Regiment to full strength, Gough was wounded in the right hand and arm in November, losing the tip of one finger. He was invalided home on the steamship Plassy in January 1902, and reverted to his substantive rank of captain. He was mentioned in dispatches four times (including the final despatch by Lord Kitchener dated 23 June 1902).

== Edwardian era ==
After his return from South Africa Gough declined an offer of a place on the General Staff, hoping to return to active service in South Africa. He changed his mind after the Treaty of Vereeniging ended the war (31 May 1902), but there were no longer any vacancies at the War Office.

He returned as a regular captain in the 16th Lancers on 23 August 1902, but was back in a staff position the following month when he was appointed brigade major, 1st Cavalry Brigade at Aldershot on 24 September 1902 with promotion to the substantive rank of major on 22 October 1902. His brevet rank of lieutenant-colonel took effect the following day (23 October 1902). His duties included re-equipping regular units as they returned from South Africa. He enjoyed a poor relationship with his superior, Brigadier-General Scobell, who recorded that he had "a tedious habit of questioning regulations ... He has not learned to control his temper."

Gough was appointed an instructor at Staff College on 1 January 1904 and served until 1906. He served under Henry Rawlinson as commandant, while the other instructors included his future colleagues Richard Haking, John Du Cane, Thompson Capper and Launcelot Kiggell. At Staff College he was the first instructor to win the college point-to-point.

Gough was promoted brevet colonel on 11 June 1906 and substantive lieutenant-colonel on 18 July 1906. He was appointed CO of the 16th (Queen's) Lancers on 15 December 1907. When CO of his regiment Gough, based on his experience in South Africa, favoured cavalrymen using their initiative and riding in small groups, making maximum use of the ground as cover. Gough was still the youngest lieutenant-colonel in the Army. His superior at this point was Julian Byng, who recommended him for command of a brigade.

His period in command of the 16th Lancers now expired, he briefly went on half pay on 19 December 1910, still as a lieutenant-colonel and brevet colonel. On 1 January 1911 was granted the temporary rank of brigadier-general and appointed General Officer Commanding 3rd Cavalry Brigade, which included the 16th Lancers, at the Curragh. He took over from Major General John Lindley.

At the 1913 Manoeuvres Gough moved his force unseen between the outposts of two divisions to attack the enemy centre, causing some of his seniors to think him "a trifle too sharp".

== Curragh incident ==
Gough later wrote "all our relations were anti-Home Rulers." With Irish Home Rule due to become law in 1914, the Cabinet were contemplating some form of military action against the Ulster Volunteers who wanted no part of it. Gough was one of the leading officers who threatened to accept dismissal in the ensuing Curragh Incident.

On the morning of Friday 20 March, Arthur Paget (Commander-in-Chief, Ireland) addressed senior officers at his headquarters in Dublin. By Gough's account (in his memoirs Soldiering On), he said that "active operations were to commence against Ulster," that officers who lived in Ulster would be permitted to "disappear" for the duration, but that other officers who refused to serve against Ulster would be dismissed rather than being permitted to resign, and that Gough – who had a family connection with Ulster but did not live there – could expect no mercy from his "old friend at the War Office" (Sir John French, CIGS). French, Paget and Ewart had in fact (on 19 March) agreed to exclude officers with "direct family connections" to Ulster. In offering his officers an ultimatum, Paget was acting foolishly, as the majority might have obeyed if simply ordered north. Paget ended the meeting by ordering his officers to speak to their subordinates and then report back. Maj-Gen Sir Charles Fergusson, GOC 5th Infantry Division, warned Gough and one of the infantry brigadiers that the Army must hold together at all costs, and that he himself would obey orders. Gough said that he would not, and went off to speak to the officers of the 5th Lancers (one of the regiments under his command) and also sent a telegram to his brother Johnnie, Haig's Chief of Staff at Aldershot. Gough did not attend the second meeting in the afternoon, at which Paget confirmed that the purpose of the move was to overawe Ulster rather than fight.

Richard Holmes argues that Gough should have done what Fergusson did the following morning: assure his officers of his own unionist sympathies but urge them to obey orders. That evening Paget informed the War Office by telegram that 57 officers preferred to accept dismissal (it was actually 61 including Gough). Gough was suspended from duty and he and 2 of his 3 colonels (the attitude of the third was unclear) were summoned to the War Office in London to explain themselves. Chetwode, who was nominated to take Gough's place if necessary, described him as "hot-headed and very Irish".

=== The "Peccant paragraphs" ===
Gough sent a telegram to the elderly Field-Marshal Roberts (who had been lobbying the King and arguing with John French (CIGS) on the telephone), purporting to ask for advice, although possibly designed to goad him into further action. Roberts learned from an interview with J.E.B. Seely (Secretary of State for War) that Paget had exceeded his instructions (in talking of "active operations" against Ulster and in giving officers a chance to discuss hypothetical orders and threaten to resign) and left a note for Hubert Gough to this effect. With this news, Gough, accompanied by his brother (who had opened the note in error), confirmed to Ewart (on the morning of Sunday 22 March) that he would have obeyed a direct order to move against Ulster. French threatened to resign if Gough were not reinstated.

In another meeting at the War Office (23 March), Gough demanded a written guarantee from French and Ewart that the Army would not be used against Ulster (possibly influenced by Major-General Henry Wilson, who had recently suggested similar terms to Seely, and with whom Gough had breakfasted that morning). At another meeting with Seely, who – by Gough's account – attempted unsuccessfully to browbeat Gough by staring at him, Seely accepted French's suggestion that a written document from the Army Council might help to convince Gough's officers. The Cabinet approved a text, stating that the Army Council were satisfied that the incident had been a misunderstanding, and that it was "the duty of all soldiers to obey lawful commands", to which Seely added two paragraphs, stating that the Government had the right to use the "forces of the Crown" in Ireland or elsewhere, but had no intention of using force "to crush opposition to the Home Rule Bill".

At another meeting after 4 pm Gough, on the advice of Henry Wilson (also present), insisted on adding a further paragraph clarifying that the Army would not be used to enforce Home Rule on Ulster, with which French concurred in writing. When H.H. Asquith (Prime Minister) learned of this he demanded that Gough return the document, which he refused to do. Asquith publicly repudiated the "peccant paragraphs" (25 March). French and Seely both had to resign.

== Works ==
- Gough, Hubert, Soldiering On: Being the memoirs of Sir Hubert Gough, New York: Speller, 1957

Military offices
Preceded by Sir Thompson Capper	GOC 7th Division; April–July 1915	Succeeded by Sir Thompson Capper
Preceded by Charles Monro	GOC I Corps; 1915–1916	Succeeded by Arthur Holland
Preceded by None	GOC-in-C Fifth Army; 1916–1918	Succeeded by William Peyton
Honorary titles
Preceded by Edmund Allenby, 1st Viscount Allenby	Colonel of the 16th/5th Lancers; 1936–1943	Succeeded by Henry Cecil Lloyd Howard
