= Henry Wilson (British Army officer, born 1859) =

British army general (1859–1941)

Lieutenant-General Sir Henry Wilson KCB KCMG
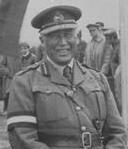
- Wilson in Macedonia, 1916
- Born: 18 February 1859; Suffolk, England
- Died: 16 November 1941 (aged 82)
- Relatives: Field Marshal Lord Wilson
- Military career
- Allegiance: United Kingdom
- Branch: British Army
- Service years: 1878–1921
- Rank: Lieutenant-General
- Unit: Rifle Brigade (The Prince Consort's Own)
- Commands: 12th Infantry Brigade (1912–1914); 4th Division (1914–1915); XII Corps (1915–1919); Allied Forces, Gallipoli and Bosporus (1918–1919); Allied Forces, Turkey in Europe (1919–1920); British Salonika Army (1919–1920); British Army of the Black Sea (1919–1920)
- Conflicts: Second Afghan War; Capture of Ali Masjid; Second Boer War; Battle of Colenso; Battle of Vaal Krantz; World War I; Battle of Le Cateau; First Battle of the Aisne; Battle of Armentieres; First Battle of Messines; First Battle of Ypres; Second Battle of Ypres; First Battle of Doiran; Second Battle of Doiran
- Awards: Knight Commander of the Order of the Bath (1915); Knight Commander of the Order of St Michael and St George (1918); Companion of the Order of the Bath (1910); Mentioned in dispatches (3); Croix de Commandeur, Legion d'Honneur (France) (1917); Grand Commander, Order of the Redeemer, 2nd Class (Greece) (1918); Croce di Guerra (Italy) (1919); Order of the White Eagle (Serbia)
- Other work: Colonel Commandant, 2nd Battalion, Rifle Brigade

Lieutenant-General Sir Henry Fuller Maitland Wilson KCB KCMG (18 February 1859 – 16 November 1941) was a British Army officer who, throughout his long military career which spanned over four decades, served in the Second Anglo-Afghan War, the Second Boer War and the First World War, during which he served with distinction, commanding a brigade and a division on the Western Front and an army corps in the lesser-known Salonikan campaign from 1915 to 1918.

== Family background and early career ==
Wilson was born on 18 February 1859, the second son of Lieutenant Colonel Fuller Maitland Wilson of Stowlangtoft Hall, Suffolk. The Second World War commander Field Marshal 'Jumbo' Wilson was his nephew. Wilson was educated at Eton College and the Royal Military College, Sandhurst, and was commissioned as a second lieutenant into the Rifle Brigade in January 1878.

=== India ===
Joining the 4th Battalion of his regiment at Nowshera in India, Wilson served with it during the Second Anglo-Afghan War 1878–79, including the capture of Ali Masjid and the expedition in the Kunar Valley. In 1881, by now a lieutenant (promoted 1879), he served in an expedition against the Mahsud Waziris. That year he became adjutant of his battalion, and was promoted to captain in December 1884.

On 29 April 1884 Wilson married Charlotte Elise Gough (died 17 August 1942), the daughter of Maj-Gen Sir Hugh Gough, VC, of the Bengal Army. The Great War commanders General Sir Hubert Gough and Brigadier-General Sir John Gough, were her cousins. In October 1887, shortly after he took command of the Lahore Division, Sir Hugh appointed his son-in-law as his aide-de-camp.

=== Home service and South Africa ===
Wilson returned to regimental duty after two years, and in 1892 was appointed adjutant of 5th Bn Rifle Brigade. This was a Militia battalion, previously the Queen's Own Royal Tower Hamlets Light Infantry (2nd Tower Hamlets Militia) based in Bethnal Green in the East End of London. He was promoted to major in September 1895. Wilson transferred to the 1st Battalion, Rifle Brigade in time to serve in the Second Boer War, which began in October 1899.

He was involved in the campaign to relieve Ladysmith, including the battles of Colenso, Vaal Krantz and Pieter's Hill. He was promoted brevet lieutenant colonel and received two mentions in dispatches for his services. Wilson then became second-in-command of 4th Battalion, Rifle Brigade in Dublin, but was back in South Africa with the battalion for the final operations in the Orange Free State in early 1902, for which he received a further mention in despatches. After peace was declared in May 1902, he left South Africa on board the SS Bavarian and arrived in the United Kingdom the following month.

Wilson received the substantive rank of lieutenant colonel on 7 November 1902 and took command of the 2nd Battalion, Rifle Brigade, in which his nephew, Henry Maitland Wilson, was then serving as a junior officer. Between 1902 and 1907 the battalion was stationed in Egypt, Aden, and India. Wilson was promoted brevet colonel in November 1904 and went on half-pay in November 1906 after completing his period of command. He was promoted to colonel in February 1907. After completing his five-year period of command, he was appointed assistant adjutant general of the South Army in India, in the grade of GSO1.

He was awarded the companionship of the Order of the Bath (CB) in June 1910. Wilson then went on half-pay in October 1911 but the following year came back onto full pay as a temporary brigadier general with the appointment as general officer commanding of the 12th Infantry Brigade, based at Dover, Kent, taking over from Major General Francis Inglefield.

== First World War ==
=== France and Flanders ===
Wilson's 12th Brigade formed part of the 4th Division of the British Expeditionary Force (BEF), ready to go overseas in the event of hostilities.

When the European War broke out in August 1914, the 4th Division proceeded to France as soon as its coastal defence duties could be handed over. The division arrived at the front on 26 August, hungry, wet and weary after a night march, and was rushed into action at the Battle of Le Cateau. Wilson's 12th Brigade was taken by surprise and suffered heavy casualties, but rallied and held the extreme left of the British line until the BEF was able to retreat. On 9 September the 4th Division's GOC, Major General Thomas Snow, was disabled by an accident and Wilson took over as acting GOC, leading it at the crossing of the Aisne on 13–14 September.

The BEF next moved to the Ypres sector, the 4th Division detraining at St Omer and taking part in the Battle of Armentieres. Influenced by his sluggish corps commander, Lieutenant General Pulteney, GOC III Corps, Wilson did not push on, and even withdrew a battalion that was making good progress, but he did eventually secure the crossings of the River Lys and the town of Armentieres. Wilson's promotion to major general, awarded for “distinguished conduct in the Field”, was notified on 26 October, and he was confirmed in command of the 4th Division, dating back to 20 October, the same date as his promotion. During the 1st Battle of Messines on 1 November, 4th Division's rifle fire held off an attack by the German Guard Cavalry Division ordered personally by the Kaiser, and did not need to retire to positions that had been prepared in the rear. The division continued to hold its line in front of Ploegsteert ('Plug Street') Wood for the duration of the 1st Battle of Ypres.

When the German gas attack initiated the 2nd Battle of Ypres on 22 April 1915, 4th Division was in GHQ (General Headquarters) Reserve, and over the following days parts of it were sent up piecemeal to reinforce the 1st Canadian Division, plug gaps in the line, and take part in the counter-attacks around Kitchener's Wood. It was not until 4 May that Wilson was able to reassemble his division to relieve the Canadians – parts of it had been assigned to six different divisions. Wilson was made a Knight Commander of the Order of the Bath (KCB) in June that year, and in September was promoted to temporary lieutenant-general as GOC of the newly organised XII Corps.

=== Salonika ===
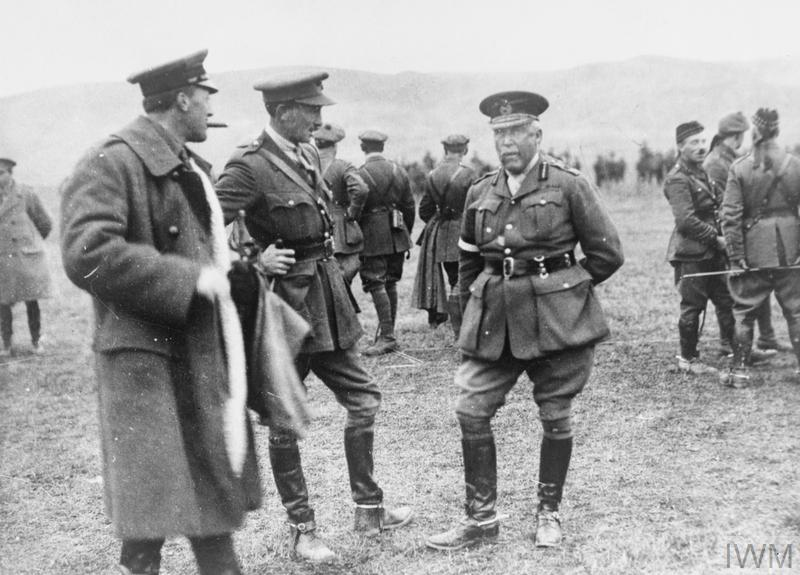
Lieutenant General Sir Henry Fuller Maitland Wilson (right), GOC XII Corps, attending a Gymkhana arranged by two Scottish battalions, Salonika, 12 February 1916.

In November, XII Corps was sent from France with the 22nd, 26th and 28th divisions under command to reinforce Allied forces on the Macedonian front. Wilson and his corps headquarters (HQ) arrived at the port of Salonika on 12 November, but the commander of the British Salonika Force (BSF), Lieutenant General Sir Bryan Mahon, took Wilson's staff to establish his own HQ, and Wilson was left unemployed for a month. On 14 December the War Office sanctioned the establishment of two corps within the BSF and Wilson reformed XII Corps.

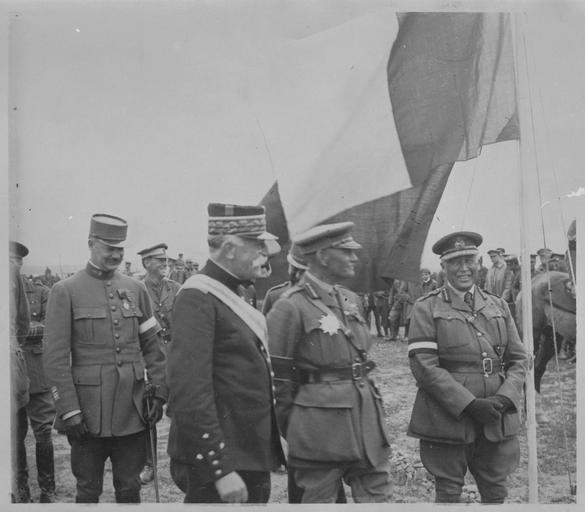
Lieutenant General Sir Bryan Mahon (centre, flanked by Maurice Sarrail on his right and Wilson on his left) at an awards ceremony at Camp de Lembet (modern day Efkarpia, Greece), April 1916.

After a period holding the defensive position known as 'the Birdcage' around Salonika, XII Corps moved up-country in July 1916, taking over former French positions, but only part of Wilson's command was involved in the fighting during the summer and autumn. Wilson was ordered to prepare an attack on the Bulgarian positions west of Doiran Lake in April 1917. The area to be attacked was 'a defender's dream, being a tangled mass of hills cut by numerous ravines'. Wilson planned a three-stage operation to capture the three lines of defences, preceded by a short intense bombardment. The BSF's commander, Lieutenant General Sir George Milne, who had replaced Mahon in May 1916, decided that his manpower was too limited, and reduced Wilson's plan to a smaller assault on the first defence line only, preceded by a three-day bombardment to neutralise enemy batteries and destroy trenches and barbed wire. This of course lost the element of surprise in Wilson's plan, but the Bulgarians were well aware of what was coming. Only three brigades were engaged, but the casualties were high and little ground was gained. Despite Wilson's misgivings, Milne ordered a second attack two weeks later. The assault troops managed to cross no man's land, but it was difficult to get information back to HQs, and some companies simply disappeared.

This First Battle of Doiran (second battle by Bulgarian reckoning) had been a failure, and with many troops being withdrawn to other theatres, Wilson and XII Corps did not get another opportunity to launch a major attack until 18 September 1918. On that day, with two brigades of the 22nd Division and the Greek Seres Division, XII Corps failed to take 'Pip Ridge' and the 'Grande Couronne'. Again Wilson advised Milne against an immediate resumption of the attack. The following day he attacked with a brigade from the 27th Division supported by the remnants of the 22nd Division, the Seres Division, and the French 2nd Regiment of Zouaves. Once more the attack failed with heavy casualties, and at 11.00 Wilson informed Milne that nothing would be gained by continuing the fight. However, the Second Battle of Doiran had served its purpose by drawing Bulgarian attention away from General Franchet d’Esperey's main Franco-Serbian thrust, which broke through the Bulgarian lines further west. On 21 September the downcast men of the BSF were stunned to be ordered to pursue the retreating Bulgarians, with XII Corps in the lead. Bulgaria signed an armistice with the Allies on 29 September, but the BSF continued to advance across Bulgaria towards the Turkish frontier, until the Ottoman Turks also signed the armistice of Mudros on 31 October.

== Postwar ==
Wilson was appointed GOC Allied Forces Gallipoli and Bosporus, and his men occupied those two straits while the Allied fleet steamed through on 12 November 1918. Wilson landed from the fleet the following day and was greeted by a guard of honour of 300 released British prisoners of war (POWs), clothed in rough civilian dress provided by the neutral Dutch ambassador in place of their prisoners' rags. Wilson spent the next two years dealing with the complexities of the occupation, arranging the handover of Turkish munitions and defences, and the repatriation not only of released Allied POWs but of some 10,000 German troops left behind in Turkey.

Wilson was promoted to substantive lieutenant general on 1 January 1919, as a reward for "distinguished service in connection with Military Operations in Salonika", and on 11 February he ceased to command XII Corps, becoming instead Commander, Allied Forces Turkey in Europe, British Salonika Army, and British Army of the Black Sea, which combined posts he held until 18 November 1920. He retired on 13 July the following year. In retirement he was appointed colonel commandant of the 2nd Battalion, Rifle Brigade 1921–29.

He died at the age of 82 on 16 November 1941.

== Family ==
Sir Henry and Lady Wilson had three children:

- Arthur Henry Maitland Wilson, b 22 January 1885, accidentally killed 29 January 1918.
- Hugh Maitland Wilson, 6 April 1886.
- Muriel Maitland Wilson, died unmarried 25 June 1950.

== Notes ==
Military offices
Preceded by Henry Rawlinson	GOC 4th Division; 1914–1915	Succeeded by William Lambton
Preceded by New post	GOC XII Corps; 1915–1919	Succeeded by Post disbanded
