= Battle of Kam Dakka =

1879 battle of the Second Anglo-Afghan War

- Part of Second Anglo-Afghan War
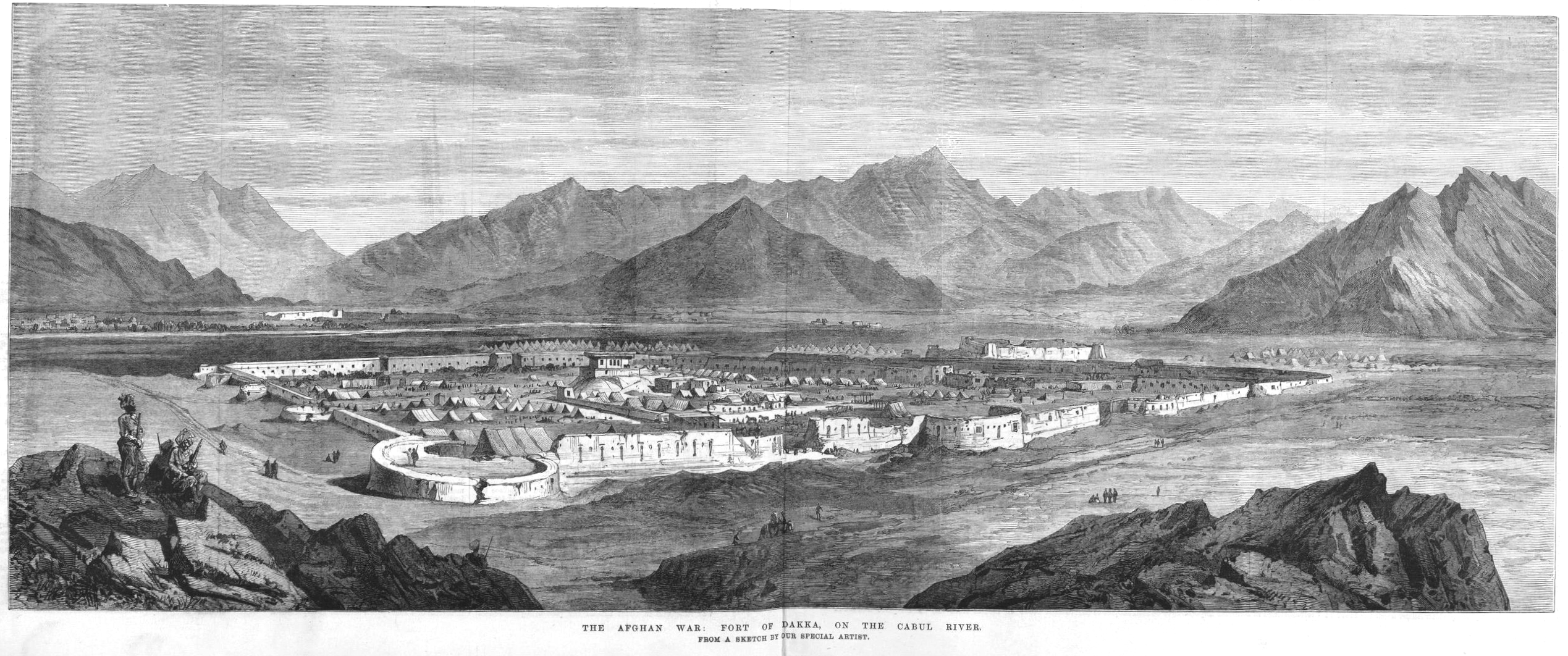
- Fort of Dakka, on the Cabul River, Illustrated London News, January 1879
Date	22 April 1879
Location	Kam Dakka, Nangrahar province, Afghanistan
Result	British Victory

Belligerents
(British Raj) British India	Mohmand Pashtuns

Commanders and leaders
(British Raj) O'Moore Creagh	Unknown

Strength
174 (initially)	1,500

Casualties and losses
6 killed, 18 wounded	200 killed (Estimate)

The Battle of Kam Dakka was fought on 22 April 1879 between British forces under Captain O'Moore Creagh and Afghan forces, mainly Mohmand tribesmen, during the Second Anglo-Afghan War.

== Prelude ==
During the first phase of the Second Anglo-Afghan War, a British force under Sir Sam Browne had advanced through the Khyber Pass as far as Gandamak. The task of guarding the long and exposed supply lines against attacks from local tribesmen fell to the Second Division under Sir Francis Maude. The fort at Dakka, on the Afghan side of the border, was defended by 800 men and six guns, under Lieutenant-Colonel Barnes.

As Browne's force was occupying Gandamak, rumours began to circulate of large numbers of Mohmand tribesmen preparing to attack the British lines of communication. The Khan of Kam Dakka, a village situated some seven miles from Dakka on the banks of the Kabul River, came to Barnes seeking protection from the Mohmand. Accordingly, on 21 April, the Lieutenant-colonel led a force of two guns, a squadron of the 10th Bengal Lancers, and three companies of infantry from the Mhairwarra battalion to secure the village. No Mohmands were sighted, but the villagers insisted large numbers of them were preparing to attack on the opposite bank of the river. Advised by the political officer at Maude's headquarters, Barnes agreed to send a small force to Kam Dakka, while withdrawing his main force to Dakka.

Two companies of the Mhairwarra battalion, under Captain O'Moore Creagh were dispatched from the fort on the same day, arriving at Kam Dakka shortly before midnight. To their surprise, they found that the villagers refused to let them enter, and they were forced to camp outside the village.

== Battle ==
Early next morning, Creagh was once again denied entry, and very soon large numbers of Mohmands were observed crossing the river, whereas the villagers were becoming increasingly hostile. At 8:00 pm, Creagh's force was joined by an additional 37 men, who informed him that the route to Dakka was cut, and that no reinforcements should be expected for the rest of the day. A messenger was sent back to Dakka, warning of the imminent danger.

Coming under increasing pressure, Creagh withdrew his force to a nearby cemetery, located between the Dakka road and the river, where his men constructed a breastwork of stones. As soon as they had finished, the Afghans launched their attack. Surrounding the small force, they used crops and other cover to advance, and engaged them in hand-to-hand combat using knives and swords, while the Mhairwarras defended themselves with their rifles and bayonets. While they were able to hold their position, Creagh's force were in danger of annihilation, and gradually ran short of ammunition.

Meanwhile, General Maude, suspicious of his political officer's views, had dispatched various forces to support Creagh. It was however from Dakka, where the messenger had arrived safely, that help arrived. Two companies of infantry, also from the Mhairwarra battalion, and a squadron of cavalry from the 10th Bengal Lancers, under Captain D.M. Strong, arrived on the scene at 3:00 pm. Leaving one company to guard the pass through which he had passed, Strong led the other in a charge that managed to break through to Creagh's force. When the Bengal lancers joined the battle, Strong led them in an attack, supported by Creagh's men, that dispersed the Afghan force.

As the British forces began to withdraw, the Mohmands regrouped and once again moved to attack. They were thwarted by the arrival of Major Dyce, with a company of the 12th Foot and two guns, whose fire forced them to disperse again. The British were then able to leave the scene, slowed down by their wounded and harassed by the tribesmen.

== Aftermath ==
The next day, a strong British force of cavalry, infantry and artillery returned to Kam Dakka. Some tribesmen were shelled from a distance, but no resistance was encountered.

Captain O'Moore Creagh was awarded the Victoria Cross for his role in the battle.
