= Peshawar Valley Field Force =

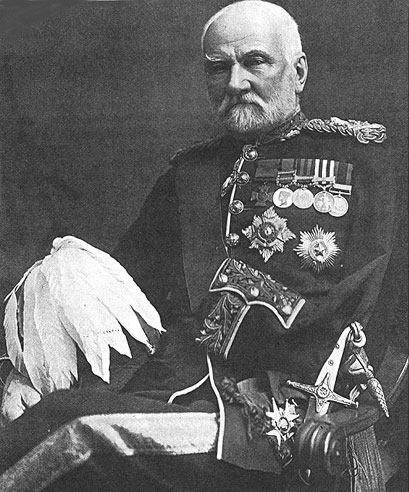
- General Sir Sam Browne (1824-1901)
- Active: 1878-1879
- Disbanded: 1879
- Country: United Kingdom; British Raj
- Allegiance: British Empire
- Size: Field force
- Engagements: Second Anglo-Afghan War: Battle of Ali Masjid; Battle of Kam Dakka

Commanders
- Notable commanders: Lieutenant General Sir Sam Browne

The Peshawar Valley Field Force was a British field force. It was the largest of three military columns created in November 1878 at the start of the Second Anglo-Afghan War (1878–1880), each of which invaded Afghanistan by a different route. The Peshawar force initially consisted of around 16,000 men, a mix of both British and Indian Army regiments, under the command of Lieutenant General Sir Samuel J. Browne.

Browne's force crossed into Afghanistan from India in November 1878 and advanced up the Khyber Pass in the direction of Ali Masjid. Here, on 21 November 1878, the force gained victory at the Battle of Ali Masjid, the first battle of the war. The Field Force then progressed further into Afghanistan towards Kabul, occupying Jalalabad on 20 December 1878. After camping here over the winter, they advanced to Gandamak, 50 miles east of Kabul, in April 1879. The advance was however slow, given the difficulty in keeping communications open and the hostile attitude of the Afghan people. The Treaty of Gandamak in May 1879 marked the end of the first phase of the Afghan War and led to the withdrawal of the Peshawar Valley Field Force to India, where it was disbanded in mid–1879.

== Composition ==
At the start of the Second Anglo-Afghan War the Force was made up of the following:

Sir Samuel J. Browne (Overall Command of the Peshawar Valley Field Force)

- Cavalry Brigade
- Commander: Brigadier-General Sir Charles J. S. Gough
  - 10th Royal Hussars (2 squadrons)
  - 11th Prince of Wales's Own Lancers
  - Guides Cavalry
- Royal Artillery
- Commander: Colonel W. J. Williams
  - One Horse Battery
  - One Field Battery
  - Three Heavy Batteries
  - Three Mountain Batteries:
    - 21st (Kohat) Mountain Battery (Frontier Force)
    - 22nd (Derajat) Mountain Battery (Frontier Force)
    - 24th (Hazara) Mountain Battery (Frontier Force)
- First Infantry Brigade
- Commander: Brigadier-General Herbert T. Macpherson
  - 4th Battalion Rifle Brigade
  - 20th (Punjab) Regiment, Bengal Native Infantry
  - 4th Gurkha Rifles
- Second Infantry Brigade
- Commander: Brigadier-General John A. Tytler
  - 1st Battalion Leicestershire Regiment
  - Guides Infantry
  - 1st Sikhs
- Third Infantry Brigade
- Commander: Brigadier-General Frederick E. Appleyard
  - 81st Loyal Lincolnshire Volunteers
  - 14th Sikhs
  - 27th Punjabis
- Fourth Infantry Brigade
- Commander: Brigadier-General W. Browne
  - 51st King's Own Yorkshire Light Infantry
  - 6th Bengal Native (Light) Infantry
  - 45th Sikhs
- Bengal Sappers and Miners
