= Frederick Ernest Appleyard =

British Army general (1829–1911)

Major-General Frederick Ernest Appleyard CB
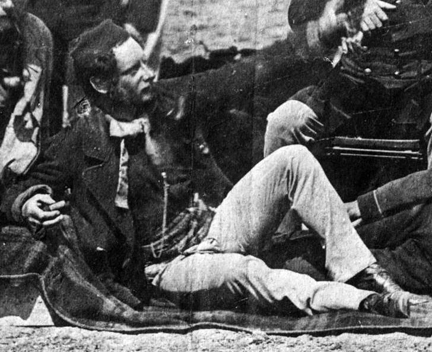
- Born: 6 June 1829; Surrey, England
- Died: 4 April 1911 (aged 81); Unknown
- Burial place: Kensal Green Cemetery
- Relatives: Frederick Newman Appleyard (father)
- Military career
- Allegiance: United Kingdom
- Branch: British Army
- Service years: 1850–1884
- Rank: Major-General
- Conflicts: Second Anglo-Burmese War; Crimean War; Battle of Alma; Battle of Inkerman; Siege of Sevastopol; Battle of the Great Redan; Second Anglo-Afghan War; Battle of Ali Masjid
- Awards: Companion of the Bath; Crimea Medal and three clasps Chevalier of the Legion of Honour; Fifth class of the Order of the Medjidie; Turkish Crimea Medal; Afghanistan Medal and clasp

Frederick Ernest Appleyard CB (6 June 1829 – 4 April 1911) was a British Army commander who served in numerous Victorian Era military campaigns including the Crimean War and the Second Anglo-Afghan War. He rose to the rank of major-general during his career.

== Background ==
Appleyard was born on 6 June 1829 in Surrey, England to Frederick Newman Appleyard (formerly Cursitor of the High Court of the Chancery). He attended Elizabeth College, Guernsey.

Appleyard's first wife, whom he married at Trinity Church, Hyde Park on 8 December 1855, was Louisa "Louise" Andrew (c.1834 – 27 September 1881), daughter of Alexander Andrew of Porchester Terrace, Bayswater. (Note: Marriages Dec 1855 Appleyard Frederick Ernest and Andrew Louisa Kensington 1a 221. Deaths Sep 1881 Appleyard Louise 47 Lincoln 7a 319) On 22 April 1885 at St Mary The Boltons, he married Gertrude Tuppen (22 April 1865 – 9 June 1917) daughter of Harry Tuppen of South Kensington. Gertrude Appleyard later competed in the archery event at the 1908 London Olympic Games.

== Career ==
Appleyard first enlisted as an Ensign in the 80th Regiment of Foot on 14 June 1850 at the age of twenty. He served in the Second Anglo-Burmese War in 1852, and was present at the capture of Martaban, operations before Rangoon on 12, 13 and 14 April, the capture of the Great Dragon Pagoda with the storming party, and capture of Prome ( Medal with clasp for Pegu).

During the Black Sea Campaign of the Crimean War in 1854-55 he served with the Royal Fusiliers, was present at the Battle of Alma, where he was wounded, and the Battle of Inkerman; the Siege of Sevastopol, including the sorties on 5 April and 9 May, the defence of the Quarries on 7 June, and the assault on the Redan on 18 June, where he was again wounded. Appleyard was mentioned in dispatches, receiving the Crimea Medal with three clasps.

Appleyard was promoted to Brevet-Major after the war, was appointed a Knight of the Legion of Honour by France, and to the fifth class of the Order of the Medjidie, and the Turkish Crimea Medal from the Ottoman Empire. During the Second Anglo-Afghan War, 1878–79, he was in command of the 3rd Brigade of the 1st Division of the Peshawar Valley Field Force. He was present at the attack and capture of Ali Musjid, where he was mentioned in dispatches, and in the Bazaar Valley, where he was again mentioned in dispatches. He received the Afghanistan Medal with clasp. He was Gazetted a Companion of the Bath on 29 May 1875.

=== Retirement ===
Appleyard retired from the military in 1884 at the rank of Major General.

== Death ==
Appleyard died on 4 April 1911, aged 81. He is buried in Kensal Green cemetery.
