= Sam Browne =

British Indian Army soldier (1824-1901)

Sir Samuel Browne
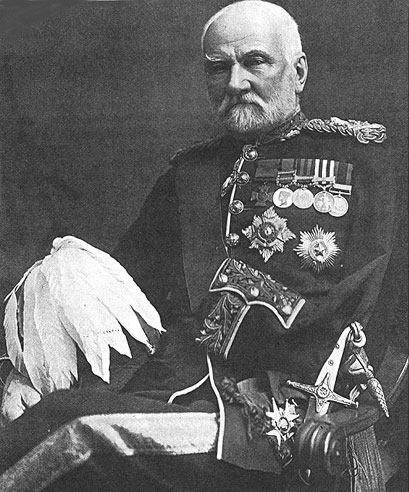
- General Browne in 1897
- Born: 3 October 1824; Barrackpore, British India
- Died: 14 March 1901 (aged 76); Ryde, Isle of Wight
- Burial place: Town Cemetery, Ryde
- Military career
- Allegiance: United Kingdom
- Branch: Bengal Army; British Indian Army
- Service years: 1840–1884
- Rank: General
- Conflicts: Second Anglo-Sikh War; Indian Mutiny; Second Anglo-Afghan War
- Awards: Victoria Cross; Order of the Bath; Order of the Star of India
- Other work: Inventor of the Sam Browne belt

General Sir Samuel James Browne, VC, GCB, KCSI (3 October 1824 – 14 March 1901) was a British Indian Army cavalry officer, known best as the creator of the Sam Browne belt. He was a recipient of the Victoria Cross, the most prestigious award for gallantry in combat that can be awarded to British and Commonwealth forces.

== Early life ==
He was born in Barrackpore, India, the son of Dr. John Browne, a surgeon of the Bengal Medical Service and his wife Charlotte (née Swinton). Educated in England, Browne returned to India in 1840 and joined the 46th Bengal Native Infantry as an ensign. During the Second Anglo-Sikh War, he participated in actions at Ramnuggar, Sadulpur, Chillianwalla and Gujrat. In 1849 he was made a lieutenant and tasked with raising a cavalry force, to be designated the 2nd Punjab Irregular Cavalry and later incorporated into the regular force. From 1851 to 1863 he was adjutant and then commanding officer of this unit. Later (1904) the unit would be re-designated as the 22nd Sam Browne's Cavalry (Frontier Force) in his honour.

== Indian Mutiny ==
Browne commanded the 2nd Punjab in several engagements, and was decorated for action during the Bozdar Expedition of 1857, being promoted to captain.

Browne was awarded the Victoria Cross for actions on 31 August 1858 at Seerporah, Rohilkhand, Uttar Pradesh, India. His citation reads:

For having at Seerporah, in an engagement with the Rebel Forces under Khan Allie Khan, on 31 August 1858, whilst advancing upon the Enemy's position, at day break, pushed on with one orderly Sowar upon a nine-pounder gun that was commanding one of the approaches to the enemy's position, and attacked the gunners, thereby preventing them from re-loading, and firing upon the Infantry, who were advancing to the attack. In doing this, a personal conflict ensued, in which Captain, now Lieutenant -Colonel, Samuel James Browne, Commandant of the 2nd Punjab Cavalry, received a severe sword-cut wound on the left knee, and shortly afterwards another sword-cut wound, which severed the left arm at the shoulder, not, however, before Lieutenant-Colonel Browne had succeeded in cutting down one of his assailants. The gun was prevented from being re-loaded, and was eventually captured by the Infantry, and the gunner slain.

— London Gazette

His Victoria Cross is displayed at the National Army Museum.

== Sam Browne belt ==
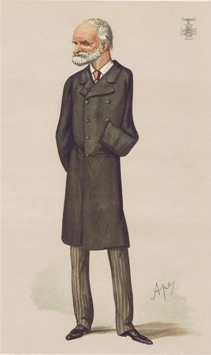
"Sir Sam"; caricature by "Ape", published in Vanity Fair, 5 February 1887

Sometime after this incident he began to wear the accoutrement which now bears his name, as compensation for the difficulty his disability caused with wearing his officer's sword. A Sam Browne belt is a wide belt, usually leather, supported by a narrower strap passing diagonally over the right shoulder; the diagonal strap stabilizes the scabbard of a sword if worn. Later such a belt would be adopted by other officers who knew Browne in India, but it was not to become used commonly by the British Army until after his retirement. Browne's original "Sam Browne" belt is possessed presently by the National Army Museum in Chelsea.

== Later career and retirement ==
After the Indian Mutiny, Browne remained in the Indian Army and was promoted major-general in February 1870. In 1876 he was made a Knight Commander of the Order of the Star of India (KCSI), and became a lieutenant-general on 1 October 1877.

During the Second Anglo-Afghan War in 1878–9, Browne commanded the Peshawar Valley Field Force. After entering Afghanistan via the Khyber Pass, and defeating the Afghan army at the battle of Ali Masjid on 21 November 1878, he occupied Jalalabad on 20 December. However, further advance towards Kabul in the new year was slowed by transport difficulties. After the end of the first phase of the war in May 1879, Browne's force returned to India. Although criticised by the viceroy Lord Lytton for the slow pace of his advance, Browne was made a Knight Commander of the Order of the Bath (KCB) and received the thanks of both Parliament and the government of India for his Afghan service. He retired from active service in 1884, was promoted general on 1 December 1888 and made a Knight Grand Cross of the Order of the Bath (GCB) in 1891.

In retirement Browne lived in Ryde on the Isle of Wight, England, and died there in 1901 at the age of 76. His remains were cremated but there is a memorial marker dedicated to Browne in the Ryde New Cemetery, as well as plaques at St Paul's Cathedral in London and Lahore Cathedral in Pakistan. His grave was restored in 2010.

== Family ==
Browne married Lucy Sherwood, daughter of Richard Crosier Sherwood. She survived her husband, and died on 27 July 1911. There were several children, including:

- Brigadier-General Sherwood Dighton Browne, CB, CBE (25 May 1862 – 3 September 1947), an officer in the Royal Artillery; who married at St. Peter's church, Cranley gardens, London, on 4 April 1900 Louisa Wilson, daughter of H. C. Wilson, of Prestwich.
- Lieutenant-Colonel Alfred Percy Browne, DSO (15 January 1868 – 16 October 1930), an officer in the Central India Horse; who married Winifred Marie (3 February 1899 – 5 august 1970)
- Violet Adriana Browne (d. London 17 March 1946)
