= Battle of Ali Masjid =

1878 battle of the Second Anglo-Afghan War

Coordinates: 34.1102°N 71.1144°E

- Part of the Second Anglo-Afghan War
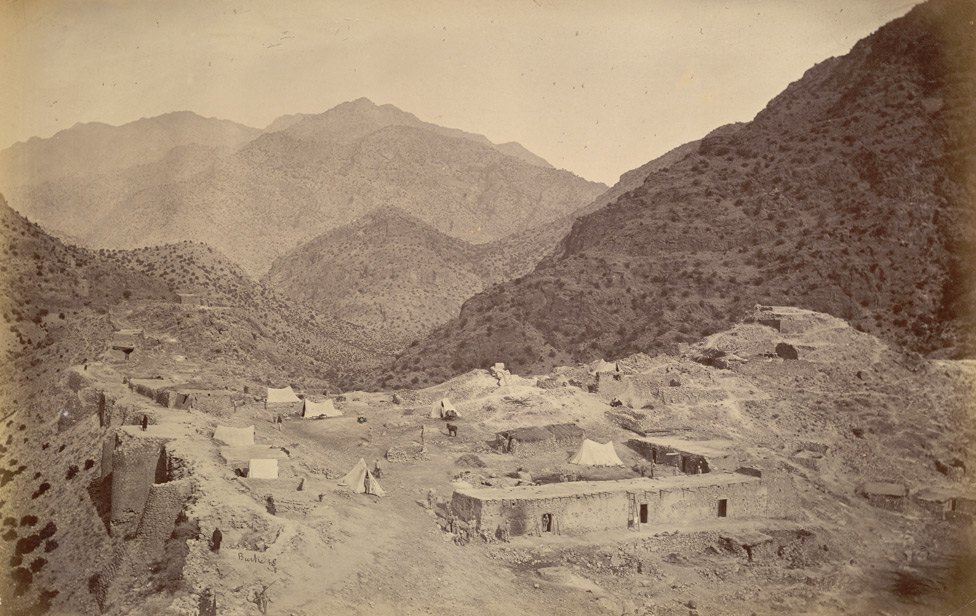
- The interior of Ali Masjid following the battle.
Date	21 November 1878
Location	Western end of the Khyber Pass, Afghanistan
Result	British victory

Belligerents
(United Kingdom of Great Britain and Ireland) British Empire: (British Raj) British India	Afghanistan

Commanders and leaders
Samuel Browne	Ghulam Haider Khan; Mir Akhor

Strength
3,000 infantry 600 militia 200 cavalry	3,000 Infantry; 600 Khasadurs; 320 Gunners; 200 Cavalry

Casualties and losses
16 killed 34 wounded	300 captured

The Battle of Ali Masjid, which took place on 21 November 1878, was the opening battle in the Second Anglo-Afghan War between the British forces, under Lieutenant-General Sir Samuel James Browne, and the Afghan forces, under Ghulam Haider Khan. The perceived offence of an Afghan general's refusal to allow a British envoy entrance to the country was used as an excuse to attack the fortress of Ali Masjid, as the opening battle in the war. Despite numerous setbacks, including half the troops getting lost or delayed and missing the battle entirely, the British were lucky that the Afghans abandoned their position overnight.

== Context ==
Imagine Helvellyn and Skiddaw, carded into the utmost possible ruggedness and steepness, planted facing each other, with just a quarter of a mile between, and drop into the interval a hill like the great pyramid, but steeper and twice as high, with the battlements of a fort on its flattened top; that is the first view of Ali Masjid.

— Spenser Wilkinson

Following the 1837 Battle of Jamrud, Dost Muhammad Khan had built the fortress of Ali Masjid to assert his sovereignty over the Khyber region. However, the fortress was captured only two years later by 11,000 troops commanded by Lt. Col. Claude Martin Wade on 26 July 1839.

On 21 September 1878, two months before the battle, British envoy General Neville Chamberlain had tried to enter Kabul, but had been ordered to withdraw by Faiz Muhammad, the commander of Ali Masjid. Britain issued an ultimatum demanding that Sher Ali apologise for the incident.

On 23 October, a group of scouts was sent to reconnoitre the fortress, and assess Afghan defences in preparation for an invasion.

== Battle ==
=== Preparation ===
The First Brigade had started training for the attack during the summer while they were stationed in the Miree Hills.

At sunset on 20 November 1878 an estimated 1,700 men of the Second Brigade of the Peshawar Valley Field Force began their flank march to assist Browne in his attack on the Ali Masjid fort which guarded the Khyber pass. The darkness created confusion and led to men and animals wandering off, it was 10 pm before the troops all reached Lahore settlement, which was only 5.5 km away from Ali Masjid.

No one was to be allowed to enter any of the villages; and any marauding or maltreating of the villagers was to be most strictly prohibited and most severely punished, for it was expected that the Afridis in the pass would be either friendly or neutral, and it was therefore necessary that nothing should be done to irritate them against the troops; whilst it was to be impressed on the men...the force was not acting against the people of the pass but against the troops of the Amir only.

The First Brigade brought an approximated 1,900 men, most of whom were hampered by the puttees they wore in place of gaiters, which tightened around their legs due to the climate and caused leg cramps. This battalion did not reach the Lahore settlement until 6 am on 21 November, just as the first battalion was preparing to leave, nevertheless they did their best to keep up. Colonel Jenkins led the scouts in this brigade.

Due to the heat, insufficient water supplies, and lack of shaded areas, Brigadier-General J. A. Tytler had to call for a halt at Pani Pal. While the men rested Tytler decided to check whether their left flank and rear were in danger. As Jenkins led a party out to scout the hills, a reverberation filled the air which Jenkins claimed was the firing of heavy guns. Tytler decided the best course of action would be if he stayed behind in Pani Pal with some men and Jenkins led the rest onward; that way Tytler was able to defend rear flank of Jenkins' troops should the need arise.

=== Afghan defence ===
The Afghans had 24 cannon. When Browne's troops were first spotted on the Shagai ridge there were already 8 cannon mounted to defend that, the southern face, of the fort; upon the arrival of troops on the Shagai ridge two more cannon were brought out to defend this side. A single gun was placed to protect the fort against an attack from the direction of the Khyber River. Facing the Rotas Heights, five guns were set up by the men of Ali Masjid.

=== Shooting begins ===
Afghan horsemen held the top of the Shagai ridge, so Browne ordered opening skirmish fire at 10 am, which led to a brief return of gunfire from the Afghans before they rode off the ridge, leading the 81st Foot, 14th Sikhs and a battery of mountain artillery to advance to within sight of Ali Masjid. Major. H. B. Pearson led signallers to hold the Sarkai ridge and set up heliographs to communicate with the troops left in Jamrud.

Artillery opened fire at noon, with sources disagreeing which side began the formal hostilities. As the British rushed to bring their own heavy guns up to the ridge, Brigadier-General MacPherson's First Brigade opened fire from the right flank of the fortress. Within an hour, the British had both 40 lb and 9 lb cannon replacing their horse artillery, while the Afghans were underequipped with only round shot ammunition, rather than proper shells. Around 2 pm, two British 40 lb shot hit and collapsed the central bastion of the fortress, silencing a "stubborn" Afghan 7 lb gun.

This minor coup led the infantry to begin advancing on the fort. The Third Brigade approached from the right, while the Fourth Brigade approached from the slopes of the left. However, while the Third Brigade had come within "storming distance" of the fortress, operations were ordered suspended at nightfall to wait until the following morning's light. This had a devastating effect on the Third Brigade, who tried to withdraw, but a number of troops did not receive the order and kept advancing without their comrades.

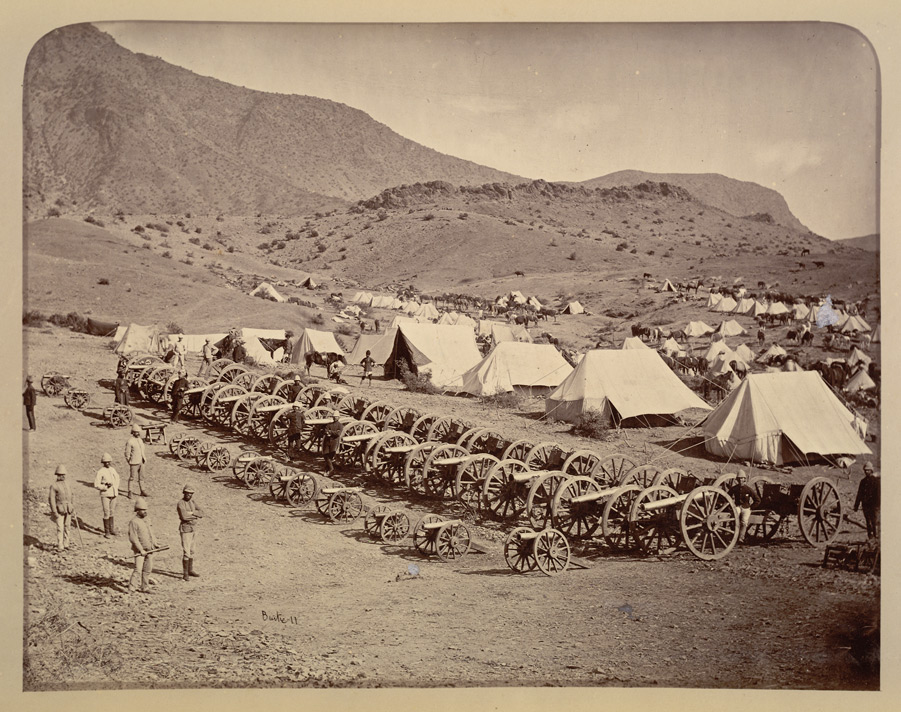
The Afghan guns, abandoned during retreat.

Whilst examining the bullet wound of [Birch], which was in the region of the heart, it was found that a locket containing a picture of his wife had been carried into the wound by the bullet.

— Evatt's Recollections

Captain J. G. Maclean took the right of the ridge, and Major Henry Holwell Birch the left with his band of Sikhs from the 27th Bengal Native Infantry which he commanded. They soon found themselves under heavy fire from the Afghans and Maclean fell injured with a shot through his shoulder. Birch and a few men went to carry him to safety but they all were shot and killed. Lt. Thomas Otho Fitzgerald took 15 men from the 27th Punjab and ran forward to help Birch, but was "twice wounded in the rush, was struck for the third time and killed outright", while four of his men were killed and six wounded. In addition to Birch and Fitzgerald, Captain Maclean was wounded, as were four gunners and 20 sepoys.

Finally, as the British were retreating for the night, Jenkins brought his scouts up to the top of the Turhai ridge.

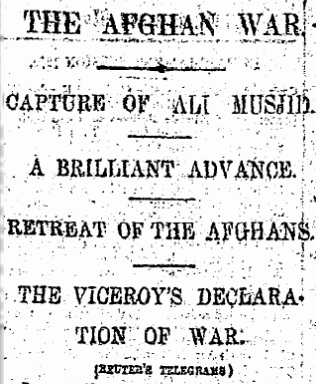
The Reuters story that ran in the Irish Times.

When the British arose in the morning to continue the battle, Lt. J. J. S. Chisholme from the 9th Lancers reported that the Afghans had deserted the fortress during the night. The retreating Afghans left behind approximately 40 wounded men, 21 cannon and food seized upon the British. Unbeknownst to Browne, 300 of the fleeing Afghans had accidentally stumbled upon the First Brigade, who were just arriving in position overnight, and were taken prisoner. Browne had orders not to operate in the country to the south of the Khyber so he was not able to follow the retreating Afghans as they made their way through the Bazar Valley.

Throughout the battle, the British fired 639 artillery rounds, and 11,250 rounds of small arms ammunition. The bodies of the dead British troops were buried in a small cemetery which remains today as a reminder of the battle, while the officers were carried back to Peshawar for burial.

== Aftermath ==
The British victory meant that the northern approach to Kabul was left virtually undefended by Afghan troops. Browne was able to reach Dakkah with relative ease, and spent the winter camped safely in Jalalabad.

At least 24 cannon of various sizes were captured by British forces from the defeated Afghans. These were neatly arranged after the battle and photographed by John Burke, who accompanied the British forces.

Eight of the native troops fighting with the British were awarded the Indian Order of Merit.

After the battle, Sher Ali still refused to ask the Russians for military assistance due to their insistence that he should seek terms of surrender from the British.

== British Forces Order of Battle ==
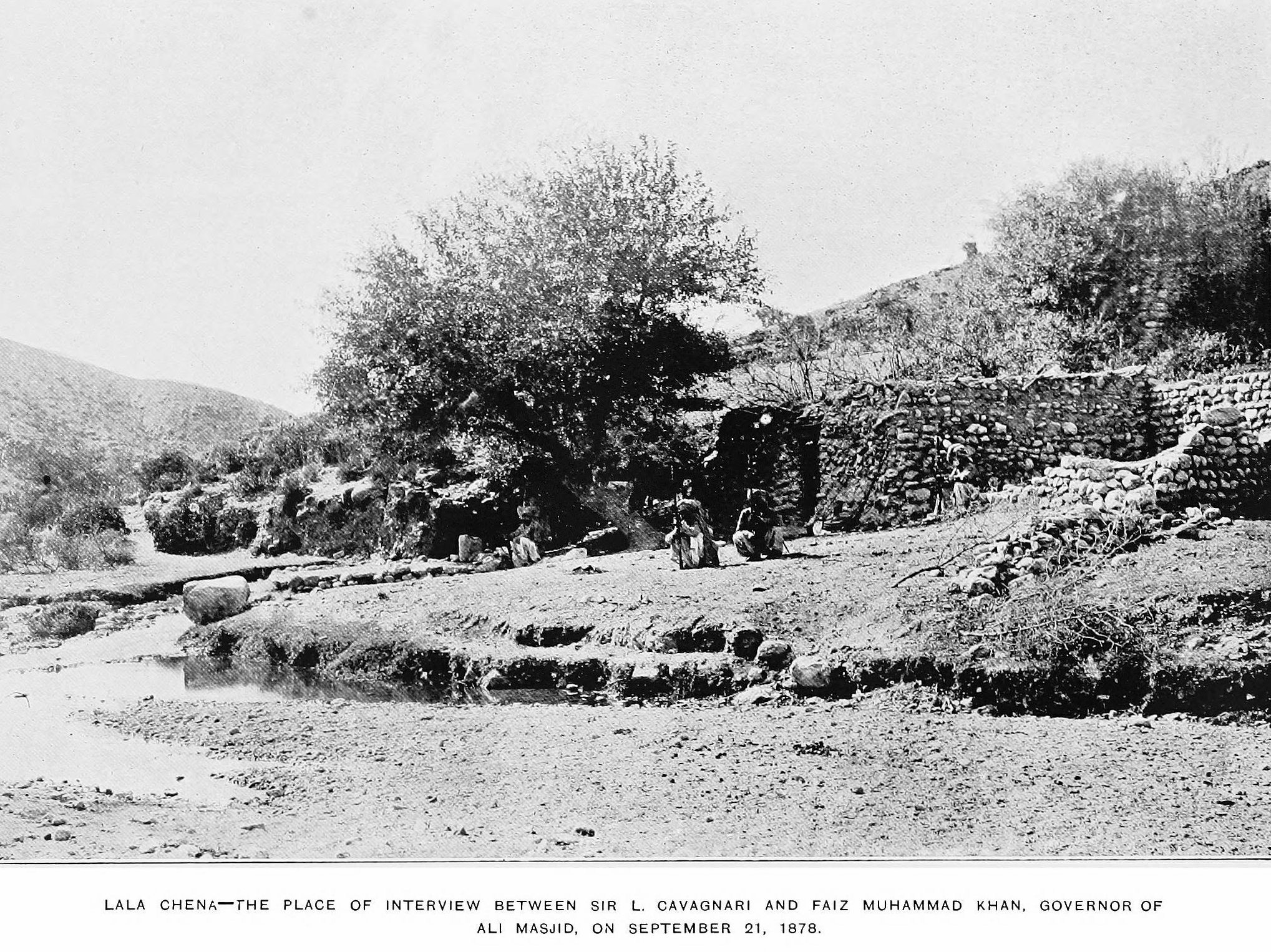
Afghan troops at the location where Cavagnari was turned away.

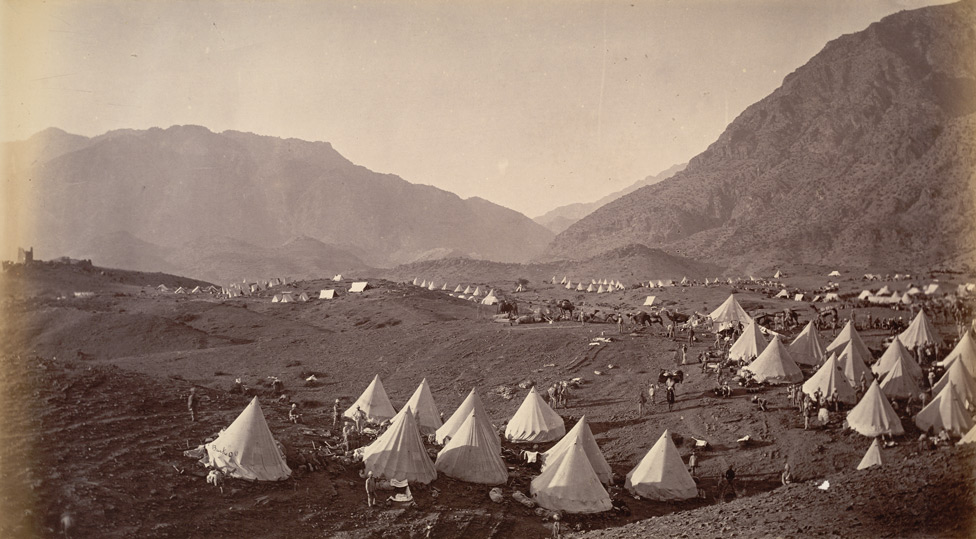
British troops camped on the Shagai ridge

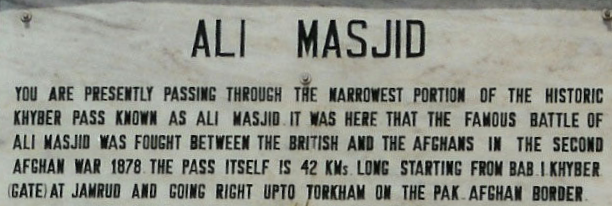
The sign at the location today, commemorating the battle.

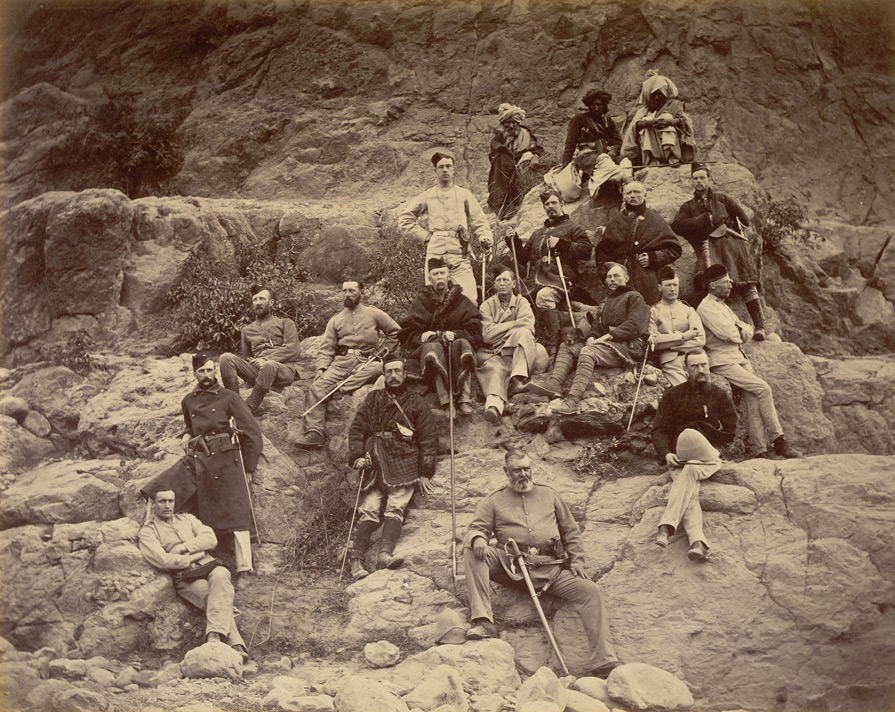
Men of the Yorkshire Infantry, in the Fourth Brigade

Lieutenant-General Sir Samuel J. Browne (Overall Command of the Peshawar Valley Field Force)

- Cavalry Brigade
- Commander: Brigadier-General Sir Charles J. S. Gough
  - 10th Royal Hussars (2 squadrons)
  - 12th Prince of Wales's Own Lancers
  - Guide's Cavalry
- Royal Artillery
- Commander: Colonel W. J. Williams
  - One Horse Battery
  - One Field Battery
  - Three Heavy Batteries
  - 21st (Kohat) Mountain Battery (Frontier Force)
  - 22nd (Derajat) Mountain Battery (Frontier Force)
  - 24th (Hazara) Mountain Battery (Frontier Force)
- First Infantry Brigade
- Commander: Brigadier-General H. T. Macpherson
  - 4th Battalion Rifle Brigade
  - 20th Brownlow's Punjabis
  - 4th Gurkha Rifles
- Second Infantry Brigade
- Commander: Brigadier-General J. A. Tytler
  - 1st Battalion 17th Regiment
  - Guides Infantry
  - 51st Sikhs
- Third Infantry Brigade
- Commander: Brigadier-General Frederick E. Appleyard
  - 81st Loyal Lincolnshire Volunteers
  - 14th Sikhs
  - 27th Bengal Native Infantry
- Fourth Infantry Brigade
- Commander: Brigadier-General W. Browne
  - 51st King's Own Yorkshire Light Infantry
  - 6th Jat Light Infantry
  - 45th Sikhs
