= Charles John Stanley Gough =

British general and Victoria Cross recipient

Sir Charles John Stanley Gough
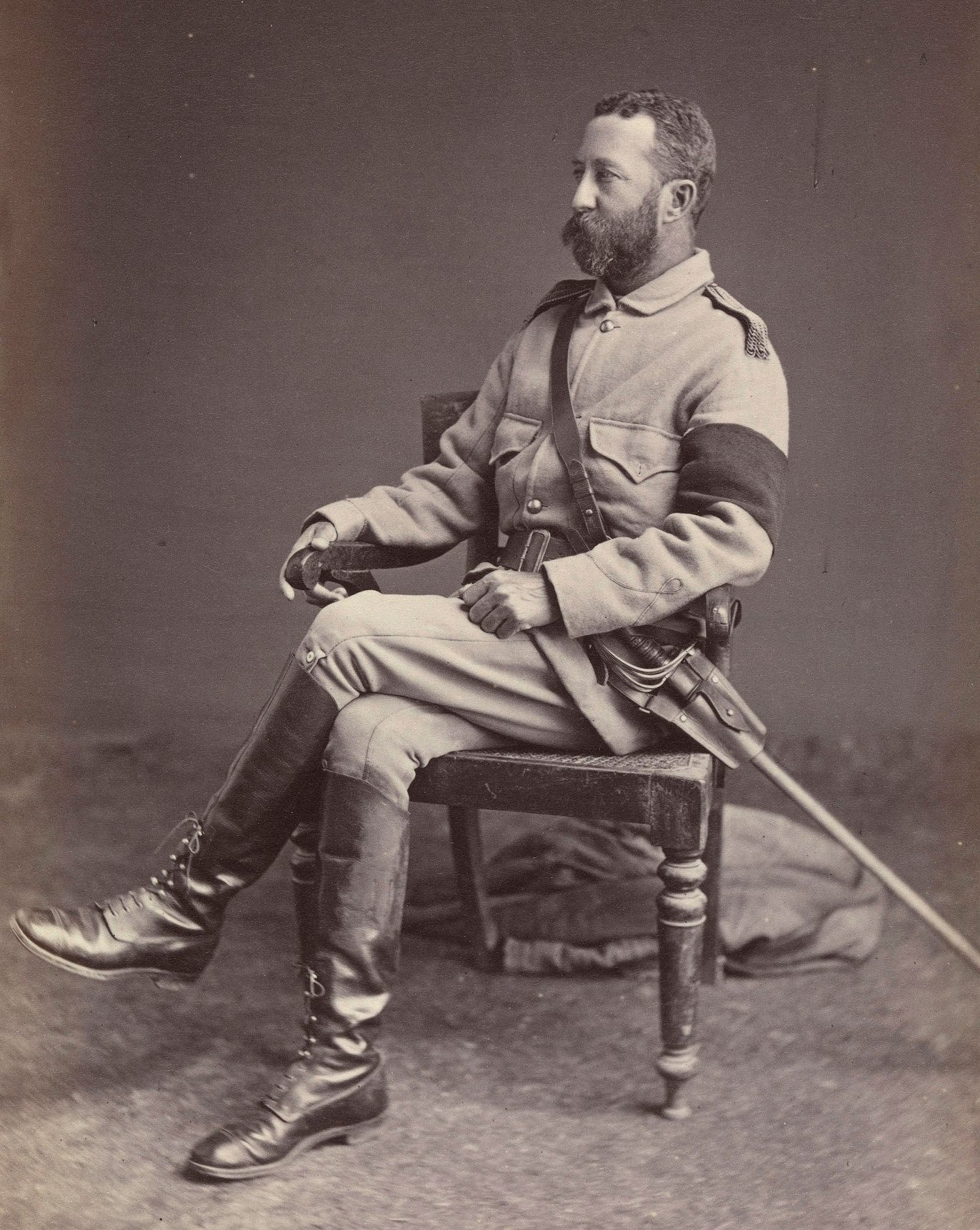
- Charles Gough, circa 1879
- Born: 28 January 1832; Chittagong, India
- Died: 6 September 1912 (aged 80); Clonmel, County Tipperary, Ireland
- Burial place: St Patrick's Cemetery, Clonmel
- Relatives: Sir Hugh Gough (brother); Sir Hubert Gough (son); Sir John Gough (son)
- Military career
- Allegiance: United Kingdom
- Branch: Bengal Army; British Indian Army
- Service years: 1848–1895
- Rank: General
- Conflicts: Second Anglo-Sikh War; Indian Mutiny; Bhutan War; Second Anglo-Afghan War; Battle of Ali Masjid
- Awards: Victoria Cross; Knight Grand Cross of the Order of the Bath

General Sir Charles John Stanley Gough, VC, GCB (/ɡɒf/ GOF; 28 January 1832 – 6 September 1912) was a senior British Indian Army officer and a recipient of the Victoria Cross, the highest award for gallantry in the face of the enemy that can be awarded to British and Commonwealth forces.

== Early life ==
Gough was born into a family of Anglo-Irish gentry in Chittagong, Bengal, British India on 28 January 1832.

== Career ==
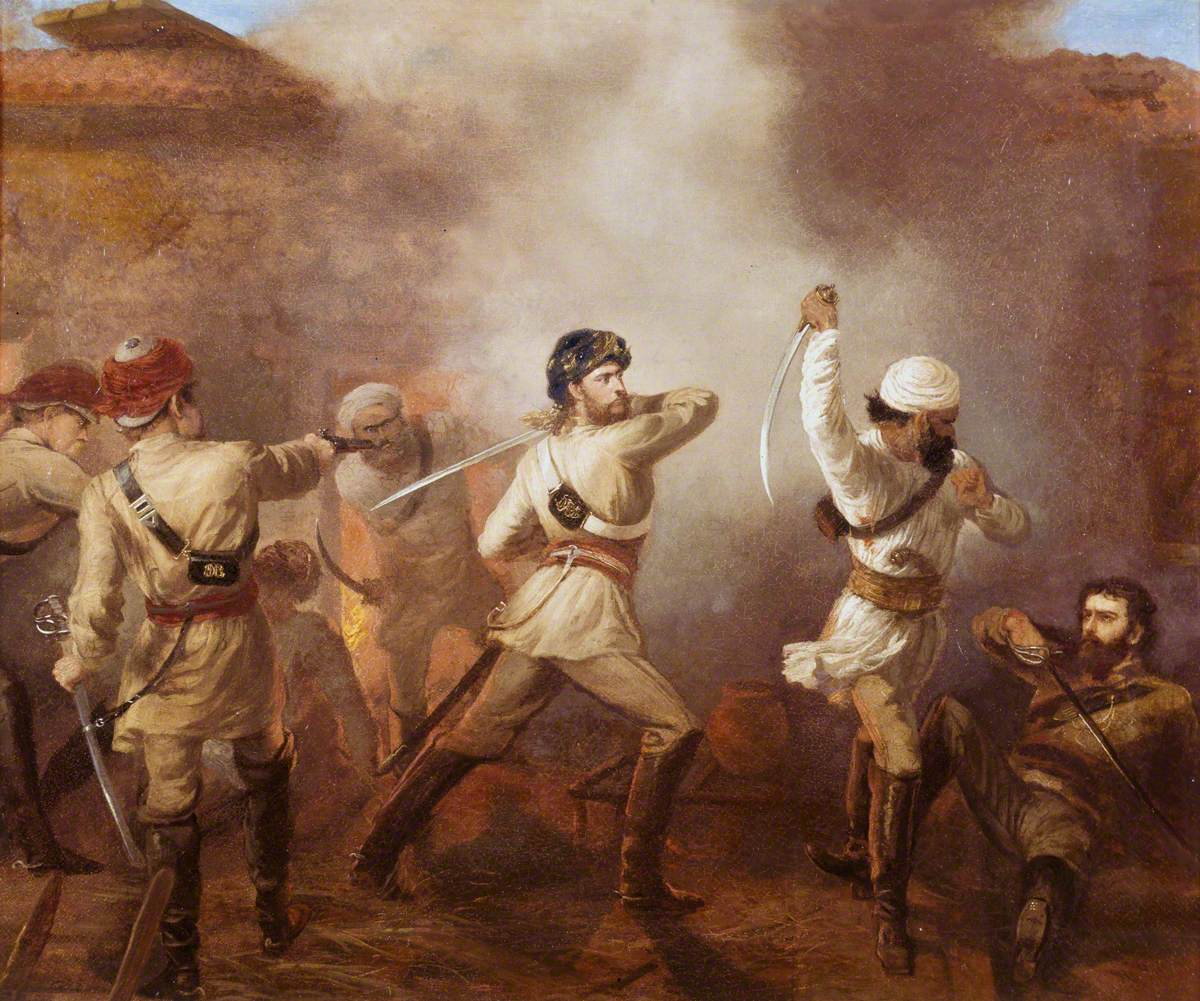
Gough saves his brother on 15 August 1857 in his first Victoria Cross action

At age 16, Gough moved back to India, joined the 8th Bengal Cavalry, and served through the Second Anglo-Sikh War. By the age of 25, he was a major in the 5th Bengal European Cavalry.

During the Indian Mutiny, Gough and his brother Hugh were members of the Guides Corps, where they took part in the Siege of Lucknow and Gough was awarded the Victoria Cross (VC) for deeds which included saving his brother. The award was announced on 21 October 1859, and the citation read:

5th Bengal European Cavalry, Major Charles John Stanley Gough

Date of Acts of Bravery, 15th and 18th August, 1857, and 27th January, and 23rd February, 1858

First, for gallantry in an affair at Khurkowdah, near Rhotuck, on the 15 August 1857, while serving with Hodson's Horse, in which he saved his brother, who was wounded, and killed two of the Enemy.

Secondly, for gallantry on 18 August, when he led a Troop of the Guide Cavalry in a charge, and cut down two of the Enemy's Sowars, with one of whom he had a desperate hand to hand combat.

Thirdly, for gallantly on 27 January 1858, at Shumshabad, where, in a charge, he attacked one of the Enemy's leaders and pierced him with his sword, which was carried out of his hand in the melee. He defended himself with his revolver, and shot two of the Enemy.

Fourthly, for gallantry on 23 February, at Meangunge, where he came to the assistance of Brevet-Major O. H. St. George Anson, and killed his opponent, immediately afterwards cutting down another of the Enemy in the same gallant manner.

After the Mutiny, Gough continued to serve as a cavalry officer with the Indian Army, and took part in the Bhutan War of 1864–5.

On the outbreak of the Second Anglo-Afghan War in November 1878, Gough was appointed a brigade commander in the Peshawar Valley Field Force, which invaded Afghanistan via the Khyber Pass. In December 1879 he led a column to relieve the Siege of the Sherpur Cantonment, his advance precipitating an Afghan assault on the Sherpur garrison, which failed before his arrival. To mark his service during the war, Gough was made a Knight Commander of the Order of the Bath (KCB) in 1881.

Gough then held a number of senior posts, including command of the Hyderabad contingent from 1881 to 1885, and the Allahabad division from 1886 to 1890.

In April 1894 Gough achieved the rank of general, and in 1895 was made a Knight Grand Cross of the Order of the Bath (GCB), retiring to Ireland the same year.

He died on 6 September 1912 aged 80 in Clonmel, County Tipperary in Ireland.

== Family ==
He was the son of Judge George Gough and Charlotte Margaret Becher; brother of General Sir Hugh Gough and great-nephew of Field Marshal The 1st Viscount Gough.

On 16 June 1870 he married Harriette Anastasia de la Poer. They had six children, of whom only two, the future General Sir Hubert de la Poer Gough and Brigadier General Sir John Edmond Gough, survived to adulthood.

== Medals ==
His medals, including the VC, are on display in the Lord Ashcroft Gallery at the Imperial War Museum, London.
