= Hugh Gough (Indian Army officer) =

British Indian Army officer

General Sir Hugh Gough VC GCB
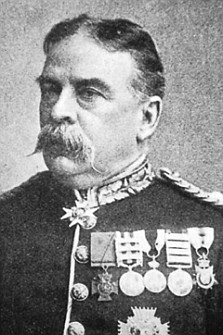
- Born: 14 November 1833; Calcutta, British India
- Died: 12 May 1909 (aged 75); St Thomas Tower, Tower of London
- Burial place: Kensal Green Cemetery
- Relatives: Sir Charles Gough (brother); Sir Hubert Gough (nephew); Sir John Gough (nephew)
- Military career
- Allegiance: United Kingdom
- Branch: Bengal Army; British Indian Army
- Service years: 1853 - 1894
- Rank: General
- Conflicts: Indian Mutiny; Abyssinian War; Second Anglo-Afghan War
- Awards: Victoria Cross; Knight Grand Cross of the Order of the Bath
- Other work: Keeper of the Jewel House

General Sir Hugh Henry Gough, VC, GCB (/ɡɒf/ GOF; 14 November 1833 – 12 May 1909) was a senior British Indian Army officer and a recipient of the Victoria Cross, the highest award for gallantry in the face of the enemy that can be awarded to British and Commonwealth forces.

== Early life ==
Gough was born into a family of Anglo-Irish gentry in Calcutta, Bengal, India, on 14 November 1833. He was commissioned ensign in the 3rd Bengal Light Cavalry in September 1853 aged 19, and was still serving with the Indian Army on the outbreak of the First Indian War of Independence in 1857.

== Victoria Cross ==
Gough was 23 years old, and a lieutenant in the 1st Bengal European Light Cavalry (later 19th Hussars) during the 1857 Rebellion, when the following deeds took place for which he was awarded the VC:

1st Bengal European Light Cavalry, Lieutenant Hugh Henry Gough

Date of Acts of Bravery, 12th November, 1857, and 25th February, 1858

Lieutenant Gough, when in command of a party of Hodson's Horse, near Alumbagh, on the 12th of November, 1857, particularly distinguished himself by his forward bearing in charging across a swamp, and capturing two guns, although defended by a vastly superior body of the enemy. On this occasion he had his horse wounded in two places, and his turban cut through by sword cuts, whilst engaged in combat with three Sepoys.

Lieutenant Gough also particularly distinguished himself, near Jellalabad, Lucknow, on 25 February 1858, by showing a brilliant example to his Regiment, when ordered to charge the enemy's guns, and by his gallant and forward conduct, he enabled them to effect their object. On this occasion he engaged himself in a series of single combats, until at length he was disabled by a musketball through the leg, while charging two Sepoys with fixed bayonets. Lieutenant Gough on this day had two horses killed under him, a shot through his helmet, and another through his scabbard, besides being severely wounded.

== Later career ==
Gough commanded the 12th Bengal Cavalry in the 1868 Abyssinian expedition, and was appointed a Companion of the Order of the Bath in August 1868. He served under General Frederick Roberts during the Second Anglo-Afghan War, including the battles of Peiwar Kotal in December 1878 and Charasia in October 1879. He also commanded the cavalry brigade on Roberts' march from Kabul to Kandahar in August 1880, and the Battle of Kandahar on 1 September 1880. He was made a Knight Commander of the Order of the Bath in 1881.

After a number of senior military posts in India, Gough achieved the rank of general in 1894. He was made a Knight Grand Cross of the Order of the Bath in 1896, before retiring a year later. He was then appointed Keeper of the Jewel House at the Tower of London, dying while still holding this office on 12 May 1909. He was buried at Kensal Green Cemetery.

== Family ==
General Gough was the third son of Judge George Gough and Charlotte Margaret Becher. He was brother to General Sir Charles Gough, and uncle of the senior First World War commanders General Sir Hubert Gough and Brigadier General Sir John Gough. He was the grandnephew of Field Marshal The 1st Viscount Gough.

Gough married Anne Margaret Hill on 8 September 1863 and they had five sons and four daughters. These included Charlotte Elise Gough (died 17 August 1942), who married Lieutenant General Sir Henry Wilson, by whom she had three children:

- Captain Arthur Henry Maitland Wilson, 12th Cavalry, b 22 January 1885, accidentally killed in Khaniken, Mesopotamia 29 January 1918.
- Hugh Maitland Wilson, 6 April 1886.
- Muriel Maitland Wilson, died unmarried 25 June 1950.

== Works ==
- Old Memories. Cornell University Library (1 January 1897) ISBN 978-1-4297-4127-9
