= John Gough (British Army officer) =

British Army officer and recipient of the Victoria Cross

Brigadier-General John Gough VC CB CMG ADC
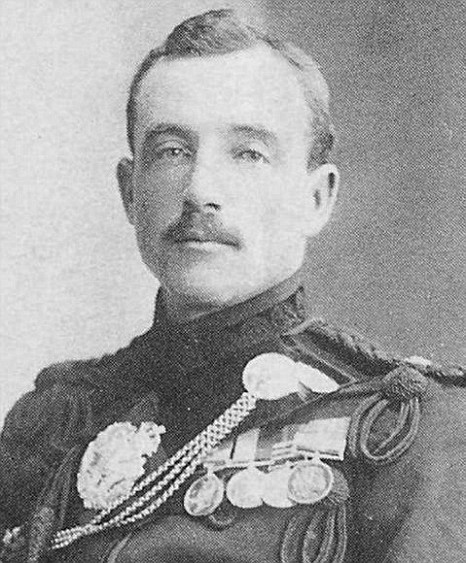
- Gough, c. 1896
- Born: 25 October 1871; Murree, Punjab, British India (now Punjab, Pakistan)
- Died: 22 February 1915 (aged 43); Fauquissart, France
- Burial place: Estaires Communal Cemetery
- Relatives: Sir Charles Gough (father); Sir Hugh Gough (uncle); Sir Hubert Gough (brother)
- Military career
- Branch: British Army
- Service years: 1892–1915
- Rank: Brigadier-General
- Unit: Rifle Brigade
- Conflicts: Mahdist War; 1898 Occupation of Crete; Second Boer War; Third Somaliland Expedition; First World War (DOW)
- Awards: Victoria Cross; Knight Commander of the Order of the Bath; Companion of the Order of St Michael and St George; Mentioned in Despatches

Brigadier-General John Edmond Gough, VC, CB, CMG, ADC (25 October 1871 – 22 February 1915) was a British Army officer and a recipient of the Victoria Cross, the highest award for gallantry in the face of the enemy that can be awarded to British and Commonwealth forces.

== Early military career ==
Gough, known as "Johnnie", was the son of General Sir Charles Gough, and nephew of General Sir Hugh Gough, both of whom won the Victoria Cross (VC) during the Indian Mutiny in 1857. This gave the family the rare distinction of holding the VC simultaneously by father, brother and (father's) son. He was also the younger brother of General Sir Hubert Gough (1870–1963), who led the British Fifth Army on the Western Front during the First World War.

Gough was, after graduating from the Royal Military College, Sandhurst, commissioned as a second lieutenant in the Rifle Brigade (The Prince Consort's Own) on 12 March 1892, and promoted to lieutenant on 6 December 1893. He served with the Central African Rifles in 1896, the Sudan in 1898, and took part in the Occupation of Crete (1898–99). Promoted to captain on 5 December 1898, he served in the Second Boer War from 1899 until 1902, and received a brevet rank of major on 29 November 1900.

After the war ended in June 1902, Gough was among a number of officers who left Cape Town on the SS Kildonan Castle in late July, arriving in Southampton the following month. In late 1902 he left the United Kingdom for Berbera, to be a staff officer in a flying column in the Somaliland Field Force, serving in British Somaliland during the Third Somaliland Expedition. He was seconded from his regiment in order to attend the Staff College, Camberley from 1904–05, was back in Somaliland in 1909, then returned to the college as an influential lecturer on war studies from 1909 to 1913. He was promoted to colonel in December 1909.

=== Award of the VC ===
Gough was 31 years old, and a brevet major in the Rifle Brigade (The Prince Consort's Own) during the Third Somaliland Expedition when the following event took place for which he was awarded the VC.

On 22 April 1903, Gough was in command of a column on the march which was attacked by an enemy force in superior numbers, that is the Darawiish army of Diiriye Guure near Daratoleh, British Somaliland. After conducting a successful defence, then a fighting withdrawal, Gough came back to help two captains (William George Walker and George Murray Rolland). The captains were helping a mortally wounded officer. They managed to get the wounded officer onto a camel, but then he was wounded again and died immediately. The two captains won the VC for their actions. However, Gough played down his own part in the event. It was not until late in the year that the true story came out indicating that Gough was equally deserving of recognition. He was subsequently awarded the Victoria Cross in January 1904. The King Edward VII presented the medal to him at Buckingham Palace on 29 February 1904. Promoted from supernumary captain to captain in January 1905, he was appointed an aide-de-camp to the King in August 1907 and promoted to major in May 1908.

== Curragh Incident ==
Prior to the outbreak of the First World War, Gough had been serving at the Staff College as a general staff officer, grade 1 (GSO1), an appointment he relinquished in January 1913 and was then placed on half-pay. After being removed from half-pay in October, he was promoted to temporary brigadier general and succeeded Brigadier General Francis Davies as brigadier general, general staff (BGGS) effectively chief of staff, to Lieutenant-General Sir Douglas Haig at Aldershot Command. He played a role in the Curragh Incident in March 1914, in which his brother and other cavalry officers stationed in Ireland threatened to resign rather than coerce Ulster Protestants who had no wish to be part of an Irish state governed from Dublin. Gough accompanied his brother, who had been suspended from duty, to a meeting in London with the adjutant general, Major General Spencer Ewart, on the morning of Sunday 22 March 1914, where Hubert confirmed that he would have obeyed a direct order to move against the Ulster population. Johnnie was in the War Office on 23 March, when French (CIGS) agreed to Hubert's demand that he amend a Cabinet document to promise that the British Army would not be used to enforce Irish Home Rule on Ulster. French may have been acting in the belief that the matter needed to be resolved quickly after learning from Haig that afternoon that all the officers of Aldershot Command would resign if Hubert were punished.

== First World War ==
Brigadier General John Gough, far right, talking to Brigadier General Edward Perceval. Also in picture are Lieutenant General Sir Douglas Haig and Major General Charles Monro. France 1914

Gough went to France as a brigadier-general in mid-August 1914 with the British Expeditionary Force, as chief-of-staff to Douglas Haig's I Corps. In early 1915 he continued as Haig's principal staff officer when Haig was given command of the newly created British First Army. By February 1915, when he was made a CB, whilst working on planning for the forthcoming attack at Neuve Chapelle, Gough was chosen to command one of the British New Army divisions. This appointment was due to commence sometime in March 1915 and would have entailed his promotion to the rank of major general.

== Death ==
On 20 February 1915 Gough was visiting his old Battalion, the 2nd Battalion, The Rifle Brigade, in the line at Fauquissart, about 3 km north of Neuve Chapelle, about 2 km west of Aubers to luncheon at its H.Q.'s Officers' Mess before his imminent departure to the British Isles to assume the command of a new division. Whilst in the line he was hit in the abdomen by a chance ricochet of a German bullet which mortally wounded him. The event was an unlucky one as the bullet that struck him was thought to have been a single shot fired from approximately 1000 yards away from somewhere in the German lines. He was conveyed to the 25th Field Ambulance at nearby Estaires, about 7 km behind the front line, where he succumbed to the wound and died in the early morning of 22 February 1915. His body was buried that afternoon in Estaires Communal Cemetery, located 7 miles to the South-West of Armentières, in Plot II, Row A, Grave No. 7. On 20 April 1915 Gough was posthumously knighted, being gazetted KCB on 22 April 1915.

== Assessments ==
Gough was quoted as making a famous remark in November 1914 that was to be repeated as inspirational in the dark days of March 1918. "As he watched the enemy swarming over a low ridge one of his staff said the fight was decided. Gough turned with his eyes ablaze and exclaimed: 'God will never let those devils win.'" "Through Johnnie's death Haig lost a sounding board which was highly constructive yet far from uncritical. Had Johnnie gone on to command a division then it seems almost certain that, as predicted by so many contemporaries, he would have risen much further in the army. Johnnie was a convinced 'westerner' in strategic terms and a 'fighting general'. The army high command's commitment to the Western Front and to strategic offensives on that front would not have changed had Johnnie lived, but as he had demonstrated in his Staff College days he was a supreme realist and the conduct of these offensives might well have been modified by his influence with and, especially, by his ability to relate to Douglas Haig."

A contemporary, General Sir George Barrow, described John Gough as "a twentieth-century Chevalier Bayard, had he lived he might have gone to the top of the British Army". To some extent Hubert Gough replaced his brother as Haig's sounding board.

== Memorials ==
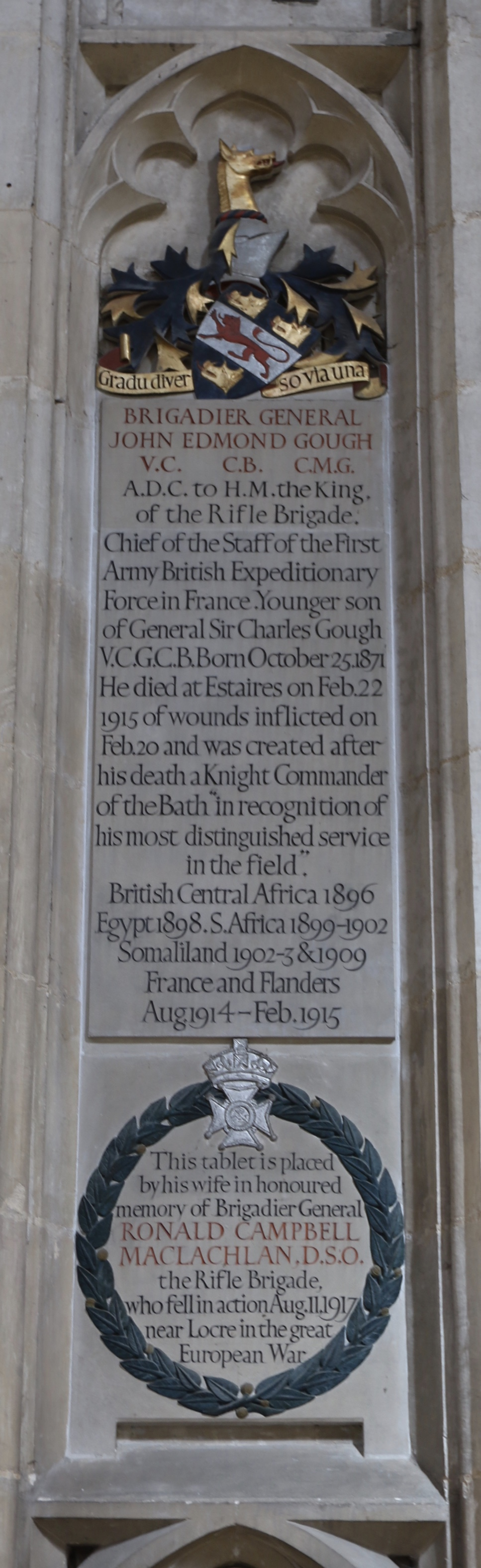
Memorial in Winchester Cathedral

There is a memorial to Gough in Winchester Cathedral; his Victoria Cross medal is displayed at the Royal Green Jackets (Rifles) Museum, in Winchester, England.

== See also ==
- List of generals of the British Empire who died during the First World War
