= Persian–Afghan Wars =

18th–19th century series of conflicts

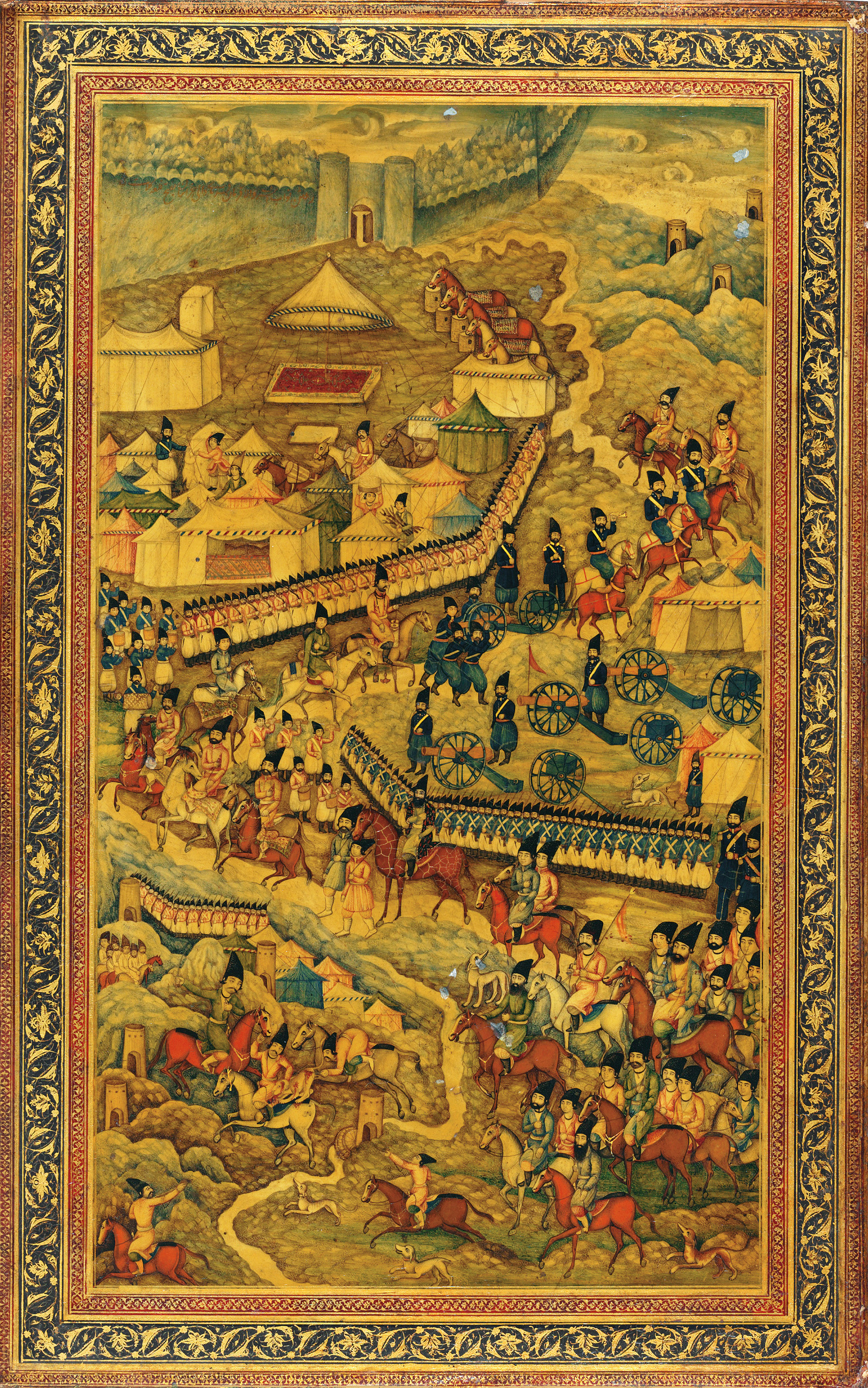
- A Qajar lacquer book cover depicting preparations for the Siege of Herat.
Date
Location
21 April 1709 – 27 May 1863
- Iran
- Afghanistan

Belligerents
Hotak dynasty Sadozai Sultanate of Herat; Durrani Empire; Afghan Khanate of Azerbaijan; Kingdom of Herat (1793–1856); Principality of Herat (1842–1856); Emirate of Afghanistan; Supported by: Khanate of Kalat; Ottoman Empire	Safavid Iran; Afsharid Iran; Qara Bayat Amirdom; Khozeimeh Amirdom; Ben-Shaiban; Zand Iran; Qajar Iran; Emirate of Herat (1857–1863); Supported by: East India Company; Russian Empire

Commanders and leaders
Mirwais Hotak; Mahmud Hotak; Ashraf Hotak; Hussain Hotak (POW); Mohammad Seidal Khan (POW); Younis Kakar †; Mohammad Zaman Khan; Zulfaqar Khan; Allahyar Khan (surrendered); Ahmad Shah Durrani; Azad Khan Afghan; Fateh Ali Khan (WIA); Sher Dil Khan; Kohan Dil Khan; Kamran Shah Durrani; Yar Mohammad Khan; Mohammad-Yusuf Mirza Durrani (POW); Dost Mohammad Khan	Soltan Hoseyn (executed); Rustam Khan †; Philippe Colombe †; Gurgin Khan †; Kaikhosro †; Safi Quli Khan †; Tahmasp II; Nader Shah (WIA); Shahrokh Shah (surrendered); Mohammad Hussain †; Nader Mirza Afshar; Ali Mardan Khan †; Karim Khan Zand; Jafar Khan †; Abbas Qoli Khan (surrendered); Ali Murad Khan †; Alam Khan Khozeimeh (executed); Agha Mohammad Khan; Fath-Ali Shah Qajar; Hasan Ali Mirza (WIA); Mohammad Shah Qajar; Izydor Borowski †; Naser al-Din Shah Qajar X Shah Nawaz Khan; Sultan Ahmad Khan †

The Persian–Afghan Wars were a series of direct and indirect conflicts between the Afghans and the Persians beginning with the Hotak revolt on 21 April 1709 and ending with the fall of Herat on 27 May 1863.

== Hotak Revolt ==
The Hotak revolt was a major uprising by the Afghan Hotak tribe against Safavid Persian rule in 1709, led by Mirwais Hotak. The rebellion was triggered by the oppressive and provocative behavior of the Georgian commander Gurgin Khan and his troops, who governed Kandahar on behalf of the Safavid Empire.

== Mahmud Hotak's Invasion ==
In 1722, Mahmud assembled 10,000 men and began advancing on Isfahan. The Persians and Afghans met in the Battle of Gulnabad on 8 March 1722. Despite being outnumbered, and poorly equipped in comparison, the Afghans routed the Persian army, and advanced on the capital. The Afghans besieged Isfahan. Mahmud and his army lacked siege equipment, and as a result, the siege of the city lasted for months, not ending until 23 October 1722. It is believed that during the siege, over 80,000 of its inhabitants died. The Safavid Shah of Iran Soltan Hoseyn, accompanied by his courtiers and officers, went to Farahabad, where the Afghans were encamped. Soltan Hoseyn removed his crown and placed it on the turban of Mahmud, officially now reigning as Shah.

== Nader Shah's Invasion ==
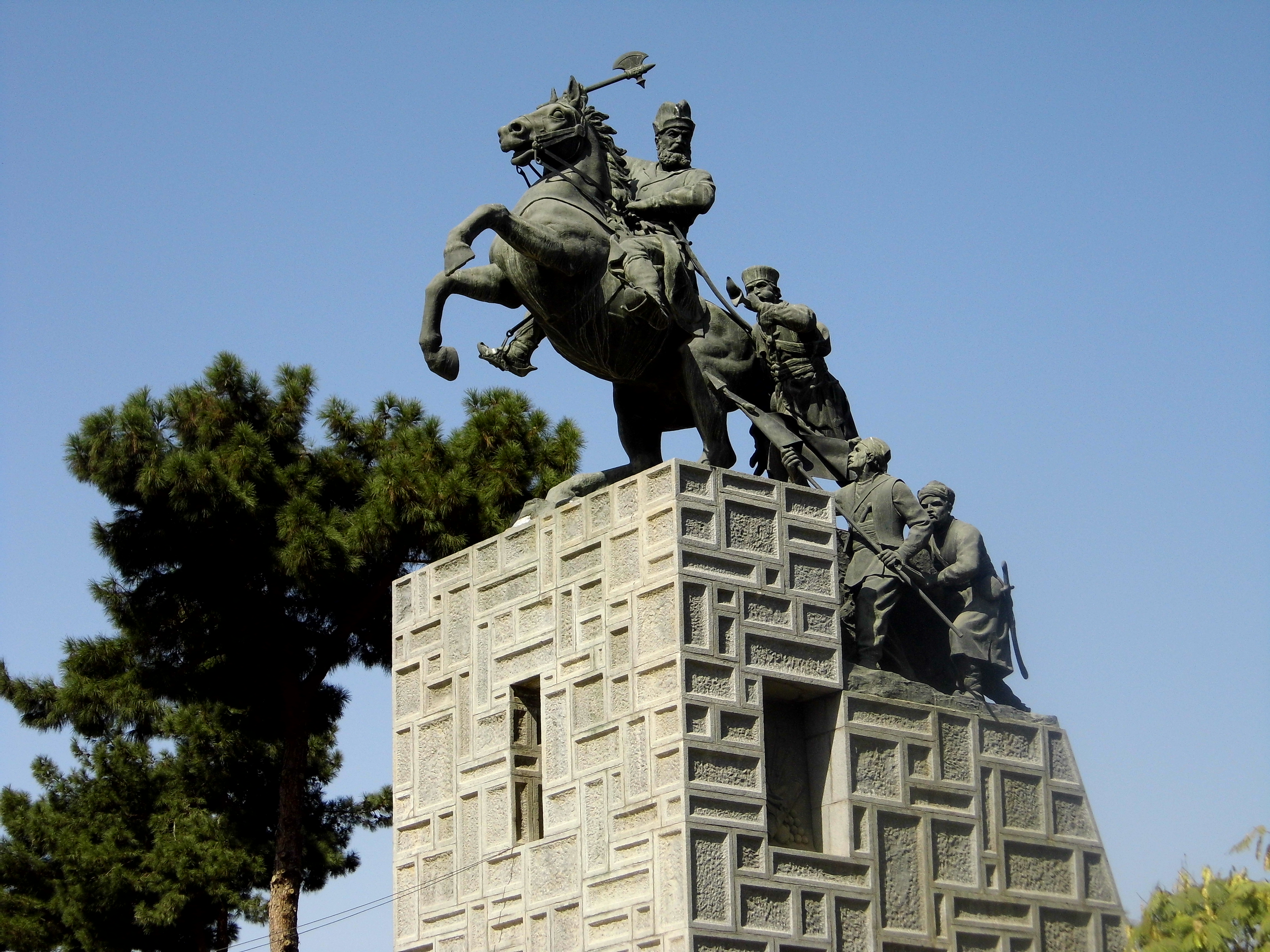
Statue of Nader Shah at his tomb

Tahmasp II and the Qajar leader Fath Ali Khan (the ancestor of Agha Mohammad Khan Qajar) contacted Nader Qoli Beg and asked him to join their cause and drive the Ghilzai Afghans out of Khorasan. He agreed and thus became a figure of national importance. When Nader discovered that Fath Ali Khan was in treacherous correspondence with Malek Mahmud and revealed this to the shah, Tahmasp executed him and made Nader the chief of his army instead. Nader subsequently took on the title Tahmasp Qoli (Servant of Tahmasp). In late 1726, Nader recaptured Mashhad.

Nader chose not to march directly on Isfahan. First, in May 1729, he defeated the Abdali Afghans near Herat. Many of the Abdali Afghans subsequently joined his army. The new shah of the Ghilzai Afghans, Ashraf, decided to move against Nader but in September 1729, Nader defeated him at the Battle of Damghan and again decisively in November at Murche-Khort. Ashraf fled, and Nader finally entered Isfahan, handing it over to Tahmasp in December. The citizens' rejoicing was cut short when Nader plundered them to pay his army. Tahmasp made Nader governor over many eastern provinces, including his native Khorasan, and Tahmasp's sister was given in marriage to Nader's son. Nader pursued and defeated Ashraf, who was murdered by his own followers. In 1738 Nader Shah besieged and destroyed the last Hotaki seat of power at Kandahar. He built a new city near Kandahar, which he named "Naderabad".

== Ahmad Shah's Invasions ==
Between 1749 and 1750, after his second invasion of India, Ahmad Shah Durrani launched his first campaign into Khorasan. Intent on conquering Herat, Ahmad Shah besieged the city for a long period of time until it finally fell in late 1750. With the fall of Herat, Ahmad Shah continued his campaign into Khorasan, besieging the fortress of Nun in the viscinity of Mashhad where its governor subsequently surrendered after a short siege.

In response, Mohammad Hussain Khan, described as one of the most powerful Kurdish commanders of the region, organized a relief force drawn from Kurdish and Turkic tribes as well as other elements from across Khorasan. The army also included two nephews of Nader Shah. Ahmad Shah Durrani, having been informed of the mobilization, dispatched a royal army under Shah Wali Khan Durrani, to intercept the advancing force before it could reach Mashhad. The two armies met near Mashhad at Chaman Zaghan. The engagement resulted in a decisive victory for the Durrani forces. The coalition army led by Mohammad Hussain Khan, including Kurdish and Turkic contingents, was completely annihilated and Mohammad Hussain Khan was slain. The army of Mohammad Hussain Khan fled to the mountains and suffered 12,000 killed.

Ahmad Shah proceeded into Afsharid Iran and initiated the siege of Mashhad, where he remained until November 1750. Attempts to storm the city by the Afghans were unsuccessful. Historians Jonathan Lee and Hari Ram Gupta state Iranian monarch Shahrokh Shah surrendered to Ahmad Shah personally so he could raise the siege. Shahrokh Shah accepted Afghan suzerainty, paying large tribute and releasing members of Ahmad Shah's family. However, historian Christine Noelle-Karimi states Ahmad Shah lifted the siege on 10 November, and was intent on returning years later. Shahrokh Shah had released a son of Ahmad Shah, possibly being Timur Shah Durrani, or Ahmad Shah's youngest son, Sanjar Mirza.

Nonetheless, after the siege of Mashhad, Ahmad Shah advanced to Nishapur, which was ruled by the Qara Bayat Amirdom. He besieged the city and demanded its surrender, its governor Jafar Khan refused despite only having a few thousand soldiers in the garrison. Ahmad Shah ordered the walls to be breached utilizing cannons, and the Afghans broke through. However, the defenders of the city had established defenses and a trap, which the Afghans fell into. Close-quarters combat began after, in which Jafar Khan was killed. His nephew, Abbas Quli, took command of the garrison and repulsed the Afghan forces, Ahmad Shah would withdraw and would lose 12,000 men during the withdrawal.

With his army seriously weakened, Ahmad Shah ordered a retreat to Herat. The harsh winter weather killed thousands while the Afghans retreated, and Ahmad Shah was forced to leave behind much of his baggage, including his artillery and food supplies. When the Afghans reached the Hari Rud river, it was completely frozen. Attempting to cross it caused much of the ice to break, killing even more men and sweeping away pack animals for the army. Upon the armies' return to Herat, Ahmad Shah faced an assassination conspiracy from Darwish Ali Khan Hazara, the Durrani governor of Herat. The conspiracy was quickly quelled, Darwish Ali was imprisoned, and Ahmad Shah appointed Timur Shah as the new governor.

In 1754, Ahmad Shah began preparing for a second campaign in Khorasan. During this time, Nishapur was besieged by Alam Khan, a former Afsharid viceroy. When Ahmad Shah began his invasion, Alam Khan's army completely dispersed, forcing his withdrawal to Sabzevar. Beginning his campaign in May 1754, Ahmad Shah departed from Herat with his army and advanced toward Tun. He dispatched Jahan Khan and Nasir Khan, the ruler of the Khanate of Kalat, to devastate the countryside. Following this, the Afghan forces marched against the governor of Tabas, Ali Murad Khan, who assembled his own army and met the Afghans in battle. Singh describes the battle that took place as one of the most bloodiest battles in Persian history. Ammunition failed to gain any clear advantage for both sides, forcing both armies to draw swords and began clashing. The battle remained indecisive until Ali Murad Khan was killed, and the remaining Persian army was completely routed.

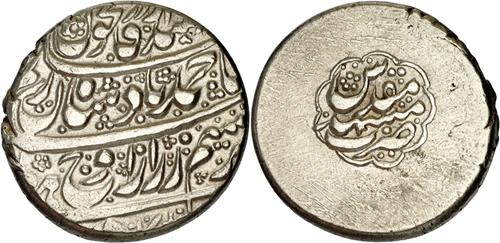
Coin of Ahmad Shah Durrani, minted in Mashhad, date unknown

With the Persians defeated, Tabas and Tun were conquered between June and July 1754 by the Afghans. Ahmad Shah then led his forces to Mashhad, arriving before the city on 23 July. A long siege protracted until the Afsharids finally submitted to Ahmad Shah on 1 December 1754. On the 4th, Ahmad Shah's name was read in the sermon, acknowledging his sovereignty over the Afsharids. With their victory, the Durranis annexed the territories of Torshiz, Bakharz, Jam, Khaf, and Turbat-e Haidari from the Afsharids. On 9 May 1755, Shahrokh Shah was officially re-instated as ruler over Mashhad, effectively as a Durrani protectorate. Ahmad Shah then began his march on Nishapur in the spring of 1755, while Shah Pasand Khan was dispatched toward Mazandaran against the Qajars.

During the siege of Mashhad, the Camesgazak Kurd contingent of Alam Khan's forces completely defected to the Afghans, killing Alam Khan after dragging him from Sabzevar, which was conquered as a result. On 17 June 1755, the Afghan armies arrived at Nishapur, resulting in Abbas Quli's immediate submission. Abbas Quli sought to be pardoned for giving resistance during Ahmad Shah's first campaign. Not long after, however, Nishapur raised in rebellion due to news of Shah Pasand Khan being defeated by the Qajars. The gates of the city were closed on Ahmad Shah's troops, so the Afghans laid siege for one week. During the siege, Ahmad Shah lacked important siege equipment, and he solved this problem by having every mounted soldier carry kilograms of gunmetals. As the siege began, Ahmad Shah's Armenian cannon makers melted down the metal the soldiers had carried, forging a large cannon. The first shot of the cannon blasted through the city walls, and caused havoc in the city through houses and bazaars. The weapon forced the submission of the city elders, and they opened the gates of the city despite Abbas Quli's opposition. The city was then plundered, with the populace of the city spared if they went to the mosques and did not take anything with them. Afghan forces went to houses and tore down the defenses, razing significant portions of the city. Following the victory at Nishapur, Ahmad Shah defeated the Qajars and advanced further by sacking the cities of Tun and Tabas, carrying out massacres in these cities. Abbas Quli was initially captured by Ahmad Shah until he earned his favor. Abbas Quli married one of Ahmad Shah's daughters, while Ahmad Shah married Abbas Quli's sister. With these arrangements, Abbas Quli was allowed to return to Nishapur as governor of the city. He would remain close to Ahmad Shah throughout his life.

Upon hearing of Afghan difficulties in Punjab, Nasrollah Mirza, son of the Afsharid ruler Shahrokh Shah, began preparing to declare independence. He first attempted to secure aid from Karim Khan Zand to no avail, before receiving support from the Kurds and raising an army in Chenaran. Ahmad Shah began marching from Herat to Khorasan between 1769 and 1770, occupying Torbat-e Jam and Langar. Nasrollah immediately rushed back to Mashhad, while Ahmad Shah arrived and besieged the city.

Nasrollah dispatched Nader Mirza Afshar to try and seek aid, which he did receive from the chief of Tabas, Ali Mardan Khan. The siege at Mashhad persisted, and sortie attempts against the Afghans were made. Reinforcements under Nadee Mirza and Ali Mardan began arriving, and Ahmad Shah dispatched his general, Rasul Khan to battle against them. The Afghan contingent was repelled at Gonabad. Ahmad Shah sent a second army under Jahan Khan and Nasir Khan, which defeated the Persians, slaying Ali Mardan Khan and pursuing Nader Mirza as far as Soltanabad.

Not wishing to fire upon the city as it contained the Imam Reza shrine, negotiations were opened and successfully saw Shahrokh submit again to Afghan suzerainty. Shahrokh also had his daughter, Gauhar-Shad, married to Timur Shah Durrani, with the marriage completed in the Afghan camp. Despite the surrender of Shahrokh and Nasrollah, Ahmad Shah had no intention of directly annexing Khorasan, and instead left Shahrokh to rule under Afghan suzerainty, who also furnished troops for the Afghan army. To ensure loyalty, one of Shahrokh's sons, Yazdan Bakhsh, was taken as hostage. Ahmad Shah began marching back to Kandahar on 9 June, ending his final military campaign.

== First Herat War ==
In July 1837, the Iranian army began the march towards Herat. Mohammad Shah planned to use the conquest of Herat in order to extend his influence up to the Amu Darya river and strike back against the rulers of Khiva, Badghis, and Bukhara, who had allied with Herat and their raids into Khorasan depopulated much of the province. The Persian Army coalesced at the city of Torbat-e Jam on 28 October or 30 October 1837. They planned a four-pronged attack, with some marching on Herat in 3 different columns, while some troops would march into Maimana and neutralize the tribes in the area.

=== Conquest of Ghourian ===
Mohammad Shah tasked Mohammad Khan, Amir-e Tuman, with conquering Ghorian. He was granted 8,000 troops and 6 to 8 guns in order to neutralize the fort. When they arrived on the outskirts of the town they were attacked by a force under Shir Mohammad Khan, brother of Yar Mohammad Khan and governor of Ghourian. They were repulsed and trapped inside the fort of Ghourian with only 800 troops. On 5 November or 6 November, the shah reached the area and gave the order to take the fort. For a week, Ghourian was ravaged by constant artillery fire which completely destroyed three sides of its fort, effectively leaving it in ruins. On 13 or 15 November, the fortress was subdued and Shir Mohammad Khan came to the shah's camp and tendered his submission. Amir Asadollah Khan was left in charge of the area.

In August 1837, Eldred Pottinger (an Anglo-Indian explorer, diplomat and officer of the Bengal Artillery) entered Herat in disguise. At this time, Herat was officially held by a Sadozai man named Kamran, though his vizier Yar Mohammed exercised the real political power. Soon there were rumors that a large Persian force, led by the shah with Russian advisors, was advancing on Herat. Kamran hurried back to his capital and began strengthening its defenses. Pottinger presented himself to Kamran's Vizier, Yar Mohammed, and was accepted as an adviser. Pottinger stiffened the defences of Herat and despite the presence of the Russian advisers the siege lasted eight months. The Afghans had around 22,000 infantry and cavalry.

=== The siege ===
The siege began on 23 November or 24 November 1837 when the new shah, Mohammad Mirza, arrived before Herat. The Iranians dug trenches around the city, slowly moving towards the walls in order to stay out of sight of the Herati sharpshooters. The shah tried to convince the Heratis to surrender rather than endure an actual siege, as a result the city was not besieged.

=== Campaign against the Aimaq ===
Sher Mohammad Khan Hazara, fearing Iranian expansion and playing on religious antagonism towards Shi'a, organized a local Sunni confederacy to aid the Heratis. The combined Sunni force coalesced at Qala-e Naw and began to harass the Iranian army. In response, the shah sent the governor of Khorasan, Asef al-Dowleh, with 12,000 of his best soldiers and 9 guns to eliminate the Sunni threat to the Iranian flanks. Mohammad Yusuf gives 14,000 soldiers and 4 guns. Asef al-Dowleh's troops left Torbat-e Jam and marched to Qara Tappeh via Kariz, Kohsan, and Qush Robat. By the middle of November, Iranian forces had seized Qara Tappeh and were marching on Qala-e Naw. Only Mohammad Zaman Khan Jamshidi continued to oppose their advance at Kushk with 6,000 men. Eventually, he was defeated with 200–300 of his men killed and, 3 days later, Asef al-Dowleh was able to enter Qala-e Naw without incident. He was able to seize cash and property valued at least 500,000 toman.

Following the defeat of the Jamshidis, Sher Mohammad Khan Hazara decided it would be best to retreat into the Dasht-i Tahaboy, a limestone tableland in the Nakhjaristan plateau and far from the Asef al-Dowleh's forces. Lee reports that by this time, the Sunni confederates at Maruchaq had comprised 15,000 men from the people of Badghis, Ghor, Murghab, Panjdeh, Bukhara, Khiva, Urganj, and the Chahar Wilayat. Mohammad Yusuf states that the army was composed of 15,000 Khivans and Turkmens, 6,000 Uzbeks from the Chahar Wilayat, and 4,000 men from the Aimaq tribes and Badghis. They also decided to split their forces, part being sent against the main army at Herat while the rest would tie down Iranian forces in the mountains.

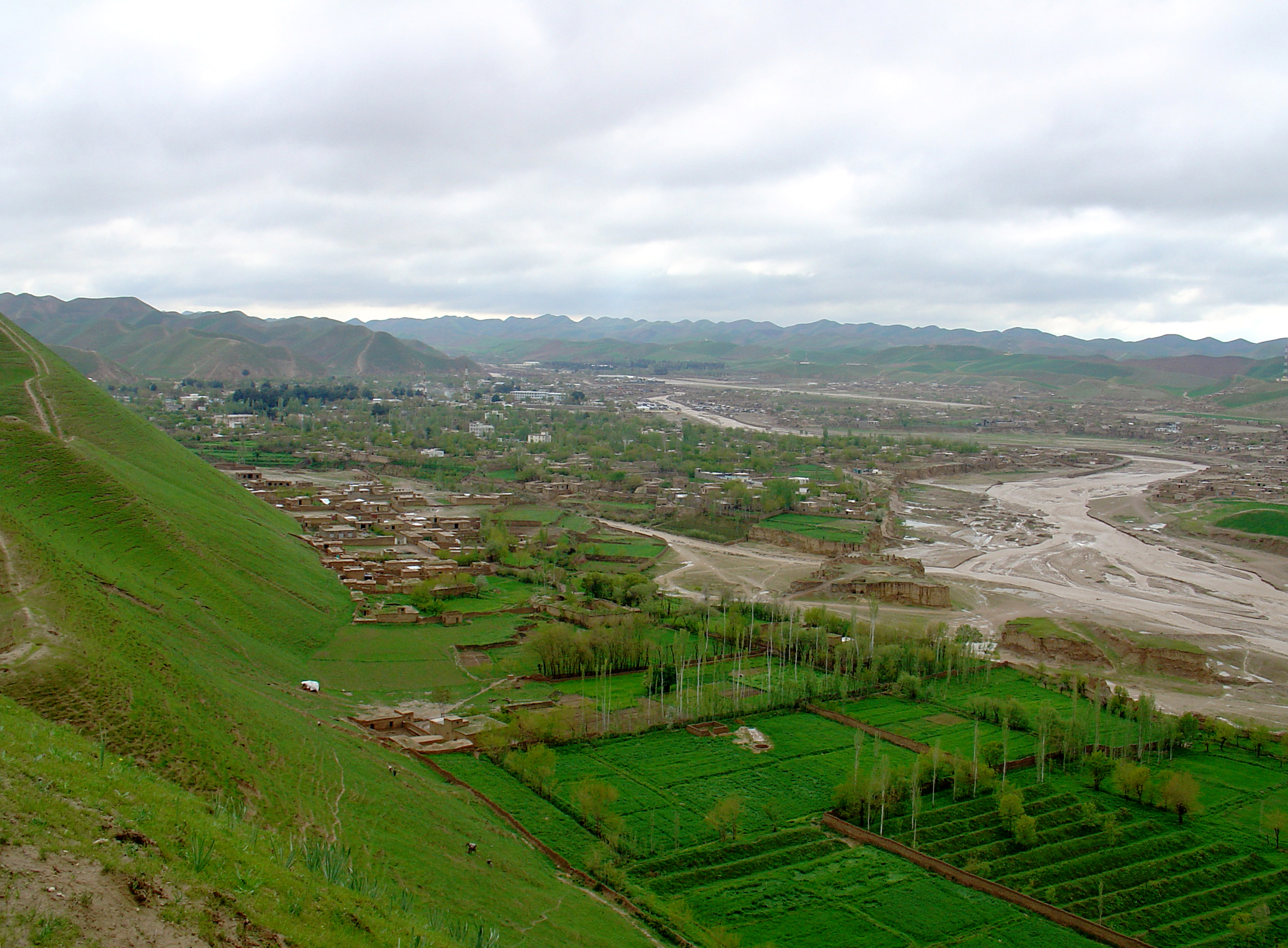
Qala-e Naw and the surrounding terrain

Even though he captured Qala-e Naw, the Sunni confederation remained out of reach for the Persians. By this time winter had arrived, the severe cold and frost taking their toll on the Asef al-Dowleh's men. This made it impossible for him to winter in Qala-e Naw, especially with a powerful enemy nearby that could use the terrain to their advantage. Therefore, after 10 days of resting in the town, the Asef al-Dowleh made the decision to push on and seize Bala Murghab before his supplies were completely cut.

The path the army took was extremely narrow and slippery, making it hard for the army to press through and perfectly suited for guerilla warfare. Indeed, the Sunni confederation took advantage of this to set an ambush. A few miles south of Pada Kaj, Mohammad Zaman Jamshidi, Sher Mohammad Khan Hazara, and Shah Pasand Khan Firozkohi launched a surprise attack on the Iranian army. In a battle lasting four hours, despite higher casualties the Persians succeeded in defeating the Aimaqs (killing 250 of them) and occupied Pada Kaj. The Asef al-Dowleh then sent his nephew, Iskandar Khan, ahead as a vanguard. However, Iskandar Khan got lost in the narrow ravines and his troops were ambushed by the Aimaq.

=== Renewed Persian assaults ===
In April 1838, John McNeill and Count Simonich arrived at the shah's camp and worked at cross purposes. At one point, McNeill threatened the shah with war if Herat were taken. He persuaded the shah to cancel a planned assault, doing this deliberately to reduce the morale of the Persian troops. By March or April 1838, Saint Petersburg had become concerned about a possible British reaction and had decided to recall Simonich. Communications were so slow that the message did not reach Herat until June. McNeill reported that the Persian troops were suffering and that the siege would have to be abandoned if the supply situation did not improve. The besieged were also in difficulties. At one point, 600 elderly men, women and children were driven out of the city to save food. Both sides fired on them until the Persians let them pass.

Kohandil Khan of Qandahar seized the opportunity to come to terms with the Iranians and take the towns of Sabzawar and Farah.

By 7 June 1838, Count Simonich had gained such influence with the shah that McNeill felt forced to return to Tehran. Simonich cast aside his diplomatic role and took over the management of the siege. When Simonich received word of his recall on 22 June, he ordered an immediate assault on the city. On 24 June 1838, the Persians attacked at five points but only managed to breach the wall at the southeast corner. Fighting ebbed back and forth for an hour. Kaye said that Pottinger and Yar Mohammed were at the breach, encouraging the troops. When Yar Mohammed began to lose courage, Pottinger physically drove him forward. Yar Mohammed then rushed like a madman to the hindmost troops, and the whole body poured out of the breach and drove the Persians away from the wall.

Meanwhile, the British government took action. Realising the impracticality of sending a force across Afghanistan, they sent a naval expedition to the Persian Gulf and, on 19 June 1838, occupied Kharg Island. McNeill, who had returned to Tehran, sent Charles Stoddart to the Persian camp with a threatening message (11 August 1838). The shah backed down and on 9 September the siege was lifted. Under British pressure, the Russians recalled Count Simonich and Jan Prosper Witkiewicz, claiming they had exceeded their instructions.

The day after the shah left Herat, orders were given to the Indian Army to assemble for an invasion which would later provoke the First Anglo-Afghan War. The Russians responded to their loss of face with an attempted invasion of Khiva under Vasily Alekseevich Perovsky. In 1856, the British used the same method to reverse a Persian capture of Herat during the Anglo-Persian War. In 1863, Herat was captured again, and this time ceded to Afghanistan. In 1885, the British prevented a Russian maneuver south into Herat, which was known as the Panjdeh Incident.

== Sources ==
- Singh, Ganda (1959). Ahmad Shah Durrani: Father of Modern Afghanistan. Asia Publishing House. ISBN 978-1-4021-7278-6.
- Lee, Jonathan L. (8 March 2022). Afghanistan: A History from 1260 to the Present. Reaktion Books. ISBN 978-1-78914-019-4.
- Noelle-Karimi, Christine (2014). The Pearl in Its Midst: Herat and the Mapping of Khurasan (15th-19th Centuries). Austrian Academy of Sciences Press. ISBN 978-3-7001-7202-4.
- Perry, John R. (1985). "ʿALAM KHAN". Encyclopedia Iranica.
- Axworthy, Michael (2009-02-28). The Sword of Persia: Nader Shah, from Tribal Warrior to Conquering Tyrant. Bloomsbury Academic. ISBN 978-1-84511-982-9.
