= Sufi Eslam =

Sufi Eslam, also known as Islam Shaykh (1725-1807; Persian, Uzbek: صوفی اسلام) was an Uzbek Naqshbandi pir in Herat who established a convent in Karokh. He famously led the Afghans during the Battle of Shahdih in 1807 and encouraged Firuz al-Din Mirza to attack Iran. He died during the battle but his movement in Karokh survived after his death. He was a controversial figure during his lifetime and still to this day his practices are the subject of much debate by historians.

== Life ==
Originally, Sufi Islam was from Bukhara. He was born near Maimana in 1725. As a young man he entered the Bukharan army of Mohammad Rahim Bi but eventually left the military in order to become a Sufi. He originally started out as a Naqshbandi but began breaking with the sect and forming his own traditions. As Naqshbandi was the dominant sect in Central Asia at the time, his teachings led to a falling out with Shah Murad, and he was expelled from Bukharan territory. As a result, he fled to Karokh and established a khanaqah in the region.

=== Dispute among Sources ===
The vast majority of sources agree that he was an Uzbek, the only sources disagreeing being Akhunzadeh Mulla Mohammad Sadeq, who states he was of Khivan ancestry, and Mohammad Yusuf, pen name Riyazi, who reports he was originally from Isfahan.

== Role in the Battle of Shahdih and Death ==
When in 1807 the governor of Ghourian defected to Hajji Firuz al-Din Mirza, the ruler of Herat, the vali of Khorasan, Mohammad Vali Mirza, marched with an army to recapture Khorasan in the spring of 1807. Iranian sources blame Sufi Eslam and other Afghan mullahs for instigating Firuz al-Din to declare war on the Iranians, for Firuz al-Din's advisors were against fighting with Iran. When Firuz al-Din heard of the approach of the Iranian troops his support for war faded and his general Badal Khan Afghan preferred submitting to the Iranian government.

However, in the end Firuz sided with Sufi Eslam's war party (composed of Afghan and Aimaq chieftains). Firuz managed to obtain a fatwa that declared the war against Iran as a jihad. Sufi Eslam called upon 50,000 infantry and cavalry to oppose the Iranian advance. Thousands of Aimaqs, Uzbeks, and Turkmens joined his army to fight the holy war against the Iranians. Sufi Eslam was given command of the army. Reportedly, Sufi Eslam was placed in a golden howdah with 366 bodyguards (corresponding to the days in a year) around him.

The Iranian army was composed of 14,000 infantry and cavalry with 12 pieces of artillery. The Qajar army encamped at the village of Shahdih, led by Mohammad Khan Qara'i. On May 19, May 30, or June 1807, the Herati army reached the Rubat Charkah field and attacked the Qajars, beginning the battle of Shahdih. During that battle the Herati army was routed and Sufi Eslam was killed by a cannonball, with 3,800 or 5,000 Afghan troops dying along with him. His corpse was placed on top of cotton and burned by some of the Azerbaijani gunners.

== Legacy ==
After his death, Mirza Allahverdi was named the Hazrat and successor of Sufi Eslam. Mirza Allahverdi later granted the title to his son, 'Abd al-Rahman Khalifa. Sufi Eslam's movement and convent in Karokh remained intact. A century after the death of Sufi Eslam, 12,000 families still followed his Naqshbandi movement in Karokh. Indeed, his khanaqah still survives to the present day in the area.
