= Yar Muhammad Khan Alakozai =

Vizier of the Principality of Herat

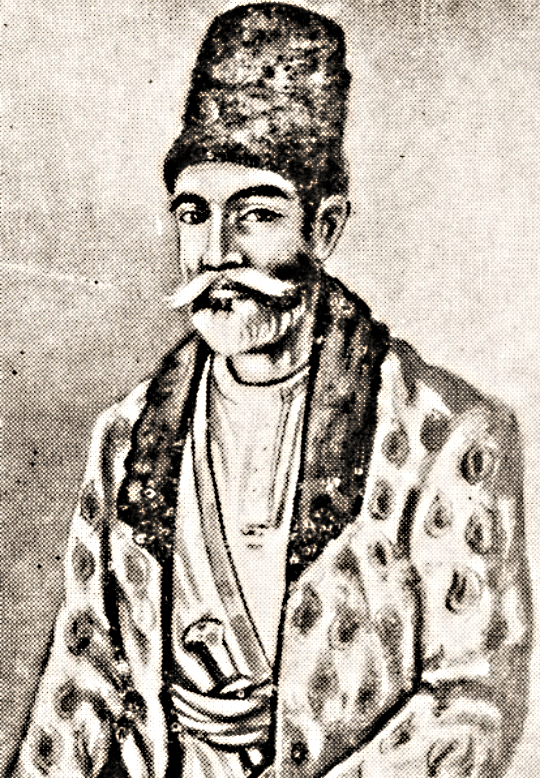
Depiction of Yar Mohammad Khan Alakozai.

Yar Muhammad Khan Alakozai bin Abdullah Khan (Persian: یارمحمد خان الکوزی بن عبد الله خان) nicknamed the Zahir al-Dawla was the vizier of the Principality of Herat from 1829 to 1842, and the ruler of Herat from 1842 until 1851. He was born in 1790 into the Alakozai tribe. In 1829, he became vizier, or chief minister, of Herat. In 1842, he deposed his Emir, Kamran Shah Durrani, and became the new ruler of Herat. He expanded the country's domains to the Chahar Wilayat and Lash-Joveyn before dying in 1851. He held a marriage alliance with Akbar Khan, a Barakzai prince, general, and later the emir of Afghanistan for a year.

Yar Mohammad Khan received the title Zahir al-Dawla (Persian: ظهیرالدوله) ("Supporter of the State") from the Naser al-Din Shah Qajar in recognition of his assistance to the Iranian government during the Revolt of Hasan Khan Salar in Khorasan.
