= Shah Nawaz Khan (Afghan ruler) =

Sultan Ahmad Khan
- Emir of Herat; Brigadier general

Emir of Herat
- Reign: 6 March 1863 – 27 May 1863
- Predecessor: Sultan Ahmad Khan
- Successor: Office abolished (Dost Mohammad Khan as the emir of Afghanistan)
- Father: Sultan Ahmad Khan

Shah Nawaz Khan Barakzai (Note: Pashto: شاه نواز خان بارکزی, romanized: Šāh Nawāz Xān Bārakzai [ʃɑ(h) na.wɑz xɑn bɑ.ɾak.zaɪ]; Persian: شاه نوازخان بارکزیی, romanized: Sultān Ahmad Khān Bārakzay [ʃɑː(ʱ) nä.wɑ́ːz xɑːn bɑː.ɾäk.záj]) was briefly the ruler of Herat after the death of his father Sultan Ahmad Khan on 6 March 1863 until his deposition by his uncle Dost Mohammad Khan following the siege of Herat on 27 May 1863.

== Early life ==
Shah Nawaz was born to the former ruler of Herat Sultan Ahmad Khan, a member of the Mohammadzai branch of the Barakzai Pashtun tribe. The Shah of Iran Naser al-Din Shah Qajar bestowed the title "Mīr Panjī" upon him, meaning "Brigadier General" while his father was honored with the title of "Sirkar", meaning "leader".
