= Sultan Ahmad Khan =

- Sultan; Sirkar

Emir of Herat
- Reign: 24 May 1857 – 6 March 1863
- Predecessor: Office re-established (Naser al-Din Shah Qajar as the Shah of Iran)
- Successor: Shah Nawaz Khan
- Born: 1818; Kandahar, Durrani Empire
- Died: 6 March 1863 (aged 44–45); Herat, Emirate of Herat
- Father: Mohammad Azim Khan

Sultan Ahmad Khan Barakzai, (Note: Pashto: سلطان احمد خان بارکزی, romanized: Sultān Ahmad Xān Bārakzai [sul.t̪ɑn ʔɑ.mad̪ xɑn bɑ.ɾak.zaɪ, sul.t̪ɑn ʔah.mad̪ xɑn bɑ.ɾak.zaɪ]; Dari: سلطان احمد خان بارکزی, romanized: Sultān Ahmad Khān Bārakzay [sʊl̪.t̪ʰɑ́ːn ʔɑː.mád̪ xɑːn bɑː.ɾäkʰ.záj, sʊl̪.t̪ʰɑ́ːn ʔäɦ.mád̪ xɑːn bɑː.ɾäkʰ.záj]) also known as Sultan Jan, was the ruler of the Emirate of Herat from 1857 until his death in 1863, and an army commander for the Principality of Kandahar.

== Early life ==
Sultan Ahmad Khan was born in Kandahar in 1818 to a Mohammadzai family of the Barakzai tribe of the Pashtuns to his father Mohammad Azim Khan, and to a Qizilbash mother.

He was exiled to Kandahar, following his brother Habibullah Khan's deposition at Kabul by the Peshawari Sardars led by Yar Mohammad Khan.

== Rise to power ==
In 1855, Sultan Ahmad Khan sent a petition to the Shah of Iran, Naser al-Din Shah Qajar to overthrow his uncle Dost Mohammad Khan and incorporate Afghanistan into Iran if he were to be supported by an Iranian army. However, Sultan Ahmad Khan was intercepted by Dost Mohammad Khan at the Conquest of Kandahar, and was exiled to Iran.

After the conclusion of the Anglo-Persian War, he was installed as ruler of Herat by Iran. On May 24, 1857, Sultan Ahmad Khan arrived in Herat, and the Iranians evacuated Herat in September 1857 in accordance with the Treaty of Paris. During Sultan Ahmad Khan's reign, he was completely dependent on Iran and not only minted coins in the Shah's name, but was also given assistance against Afghanistan. Naser al-Din bestowed the title of Sirkar on Sultan Ahmad Khan and gave his son, Shah Nawaz Khan, the title of Amīr Panjī.

He captured Farah soon after in March 1862, which had been a Mohammadzai possession since their occupation of the town on October 30, 1856. This became Dost Mohammad Khan's casus belli to launch an attack on Herat. On June 29 or July 8 Farah was captured by the Mohammadzais. On July 22, Sabzawar was captured. By July 28, Herat was besieged.

== Death ==
During the 10-month siege, Ahmad died on March 6, 1863, being succeeded by his son Shah Nawaz Khan. Shortly before his death, he had been affected by a disease that caused limb paralysis. On May 27, 1863, Herat would finally fall to Dost Mohammad Khan.

== See also ==
- Emirate of Herat
- Herat Campaign of 1862-1863
- Anglo-Persian War
- Dost Mohammad Khan
- 1st Anglo-Afghan War
- Sher Ali Khan
