= Murichaq =

Murichaq, Badghis, Afghanistan
- Location in Afghanistan
- Coordinates: 35°48′39″N 63°8′42″E
- Country: Afghanistan
- Province: Badghis Province
- Time zone: + 4.30

Murichaq (Persian: موریچاق), (Turkmen: Marçak), (Russian: Муричак), is a village in Murghab District, Badghis Province in north western Afghanistan.

Murichaq is on the border with Turkmenistan and is a border crossing point.
