= Kohsan =

Kohsan کهسان
- Location in Afghanistan
- Coordinates: 34°39′N 61°10′E
- Country: Afghanistan
- Province: Herat Province
- District: Kohsan District
- Elevation: 737 m (2,418 ft)

Population (2007)
  - Total: 12,463
- Time zone: UTC+4:30

Kohsan (Kohistan, Kūhestān) is a town and the administrative center of Kohsan District, Herat Province, Afghanistan. The population is 12,463 (est. 2007). It is located at 34°39′14″N 61°11′52″E at 737 m altitude, near the Hari River and not far from the border with Iran.

== See also ==
- Herat Province
