= Chahar Wilayat =

Historical region in northern Afghanistan

The Chahar Wilayat (Persian: چهار ولایت, romanized: Chahār Wilāyat, lit. 'Four Provinces') was a historical region in northern Afghanistan, covering modern-day Faryab, Jowzjan, and Sar-e Pol Provinces. It was named after the 4 former khanates in the area: Maymana, Sar-i Pul, Sheberghan, and Andkhui. Maimana was traditionally the most powerful and influential of the khanates. The Chahar Wilayat's population was majority Uzbek.
