= Mohammad Vali Mirza =

Governor of Semnan from 1799 to 1802

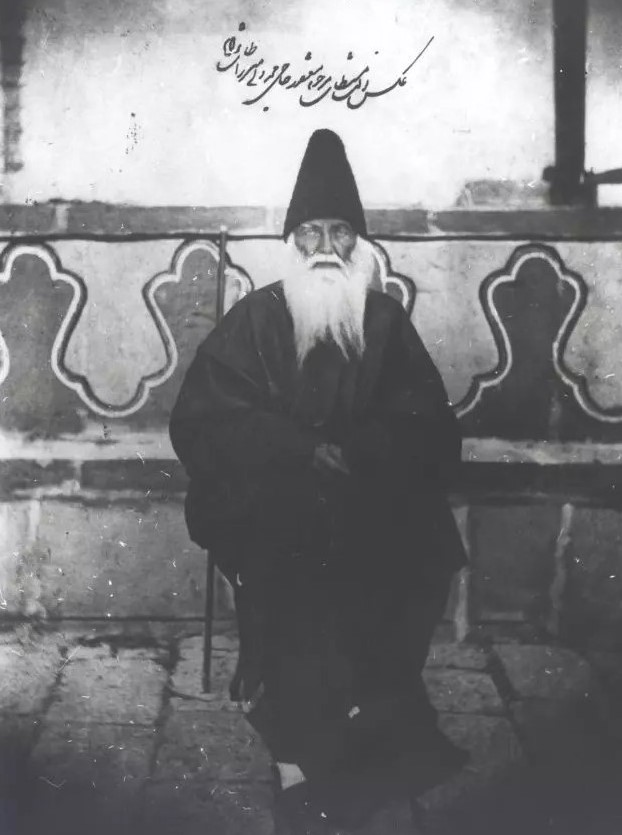
- Portrait by Aqa Reza Akasbashi, 1860

Governor of Semnan
- Tenure: 1799–1802
- Predecessor: Hossein Qoli Khan Qajar
- Successor: Unknown

Governor of Khorasan
- Tenure: 1802–1816
- Successor: Hasan Ali Mirza
- Born: 1789; Nava, Mazandaran, Iran
- Died: 1864 (aged 74–75)
- Issue: 12, including Mehdi-Qoli Mirza Qajar
- Dynasty: Qajar
- Father: Fath-Ali Shah Qajar
- Mother: Bibi Kuchak Khanum
- Religion: Twelver Shia Islam

Mohammad Vali Mirza (Persian: محمدولی میرزا; 1789–1864) was a Qajar prince and governor in 19th-century Iran. He was the third or fourth son of Fath-Ali Shah (r. 1797–1834).

In 1799, he was appointed governor of the town of Semnan and later, in 1802, of the Khorasan province, where he successfully recaptured its provincial capital Mashhad from the rebellious Afsharid prince Nader Mirza Afshar in 1803. Mohammad Vali Mirza's governorship in Khorasan was marked by challenges stemming from limited financial and military resources. This required him to rely on local elites such as Eshaq Khan Qaraei-Torbati, the leader of the Qarai tribe, one of the several leaders who had carved a semi-autonomous domain after the political vacuum left by the decline of the Durrani Empire and the vulnerability of Mashhad's former Afsharid rulers. The autonomy of these local leaders limited the authority of Mohammad Vali Mirza's to the nearby areas of Mashhad, Nishapur, Sabzevar, and Torshiz.

Known for his hunting expeditions, Mohammad Vali Mirza used these and the granting of Khilats (robes of honour) to strengthen ties with local leaders. However, by the summer of 1813, their relations had fallen apart. In August 1813, the aristocrats rebelled under the leadership of Eshaq Khan, leading to the overthrow of Mohammad Vali Mirza on 7 September 1813. Although Eshaq Khan initially gained the support of the rebel factions, his humble origins quickly led to his rejection by other leaders in Khorasan, such as Reza Qoli Khan Zafaranlu and Najaf Qoli Khan Shadillu.

== Biography ==
=== Background and early career ===
Mohammad Vali Mirza was born in 1789 in the village of Nava in Mazandaran, northern Iran. He was the third or fourth son of Fath-Ali Shah (r. 1797–1834), the second Qajar ruler of Iran. His mother was a Bakhtiari named Bibi Kuchak Khanum. Three of his brothers were also born in the same year; Abbas Mirza, the heir apparent and future governor of the Azerbaijan province; Mohammad-Ali Mirza Dowlatshah, who was the eldest and future governor of the Kermanshah, Lorestan and Khuzestan provinces; Hossein Ali Mirza, a persistent schemer and future governor of the Fars province. Intense competition would emerge between these brothers. During his childhood, Mohammad Vali Mirza helped escort Dowlatshah to safety after the latter had made a rude remark to Agha Mohammad Khan Qajar (r. 1789–1797). In 1799, Mohammad Vali Mirza was appointed as the governor of the town of Semnan, thus succeeding Fath-Ali Shah's brother Hossein Qoli Khan Qajar, who had been dissatisfied with his post.

=== Term as governor of Khorasan ===
==== The rebellion of Nader Mirza Afshar and the situation in Khorasan ====
Khorasan and its surroundings in the early modern period

In the autumn of 1802, Mohammad Vali Mirza was appointed as the governor of Khorasan by Fath-Ali Shah, who was at the time besieging Mashhad, the provincial capital of the province. The city had been captured by Nader Mirza Afshar, the son of the last Afsharid ruler, Shahrokh Shah (r. 1748–1796). Fath-Ali Shah returned to Tehran and assigned the task of recapturing Mashhad to Mohammad Vali Mirza, who succeeded in early 1803. Nader Mirza was taken hostage to Tehran, where his eyes were gouged out and his tongue and hands were severed. Eshaq Khan Qaraei-Torbati, leader of the Qarai tribe, was rewarded by Mohammad Vali Mirza with the title of sardar and one of his daughters in marriage.

During this period, the neighbouring Durrani Kingdom had been weakened due to the violent succession of Mahmud Shah Durrani in 1801, which had disrupted the balance of power in its cities of Kabul, Kandahar, and Herat. However, the focus on limiting Russian encroachment in the Caucasus overshadowed the advantageous conditions for the Iran in Khorasan, and for the ensuing ten years, their presence in Khorasan remained slightly weak. The financial and military resources of Mohammad Vali Mirza were low, and to keep up the appearance of having power, he needed the backing of the local aristocracy. As a result, his capacity to handle the Khorasani leadership was reduced. Through a close partnership with Eshaq Khan, Mohammad Vali Mirza was able to maintain his rule. Mohammad Khan Hazara Beglerbegi, the Hazara governor of Bakharz, and whose family had a history of serving the Durranis, was one of the leading military leaders under Mohammad Vali Mirza. Mohammad Taqi ibn Mohammad Mehdi Nuri served as the scribe and minister of Mohammad Vali Mirza. Uncertainty over Herat's status as an Iranian vassal and the largely autonomous position of the Qarai territories influenced many developments in the early 19th-century. Since Mahmud Shah's succession, Herat had been controlled by his brother Firuz al-Din Mirza Durrani.

The authority of the Iranian provincial governors was limited the nearby areas of Mashhad, Nishapur, Sabzevar, and Torshiz, even though Khorasan was nominally a part of Iran. Many local leaders had established their own domain in the late 18th-century as a result of the political vacuum left by the decline of Durrani power and the vulnerability of Mashhad's Afsharid rulers. The Qarai tribe, who ruled over Torbat-e Heydarieh, an agricultural region south of Mashhad that British observers referred to as "one of the most prosperous towns" in Khorasan, were the most prominent amongst these local leaders.

In December 1804, Ibrahim Khan Durrani, who governed Ghuriyan, requested Mohammad Vali Mirza's assistance against Firuz al-Din Mirza. Instead of helping him, Mohammad Vali Mirza had Ibrahim Khan Durrani removed. Eshaq Khan made use of his partnership with Mohammad Vali Mirza, getting his nephew Yusuf Ali Khan Qarai appointed as the new governor of Ghuriyan.

==== Policies towards the local leaders in Khorasan ====
Mohammad Vali Mirza's passion for hunting and outdoor activities, along with his previous tenure as governor, were highlighted by contemporary Iranian chroniclers as evidence of his readiness for the position as Khorasan's governor. According to the Iranologist Assef Ashraf; "How hunting and effective governing are linked is not entirely clear, but a clue lies in the fact that the prince would take khans and notables (khwānīn va aʿyān) with him on hunting expeditions, perhaps as an effort to draw closer ties with them." Khilats (robes of honour) were crucial in forging and preserving political connections with the local leaders in Khorasan during the early rule of Fath-Ali Shah, and particularly during Mohammad Vali Mirza's governorship of Khorasan. Officials demonstrating loyalty and appointees to lower positions were recipients of numerous khilats from Fath-Ali Shah and Mohammad Vali Mirza. Approximately 1,200 khilats were handed out to the khans and military leaders in Khorasan during the second year of Mohammad Vali Mirza's tenure in Khorasan.

==== Conflict with Herat and Khorasan's local leaders ====
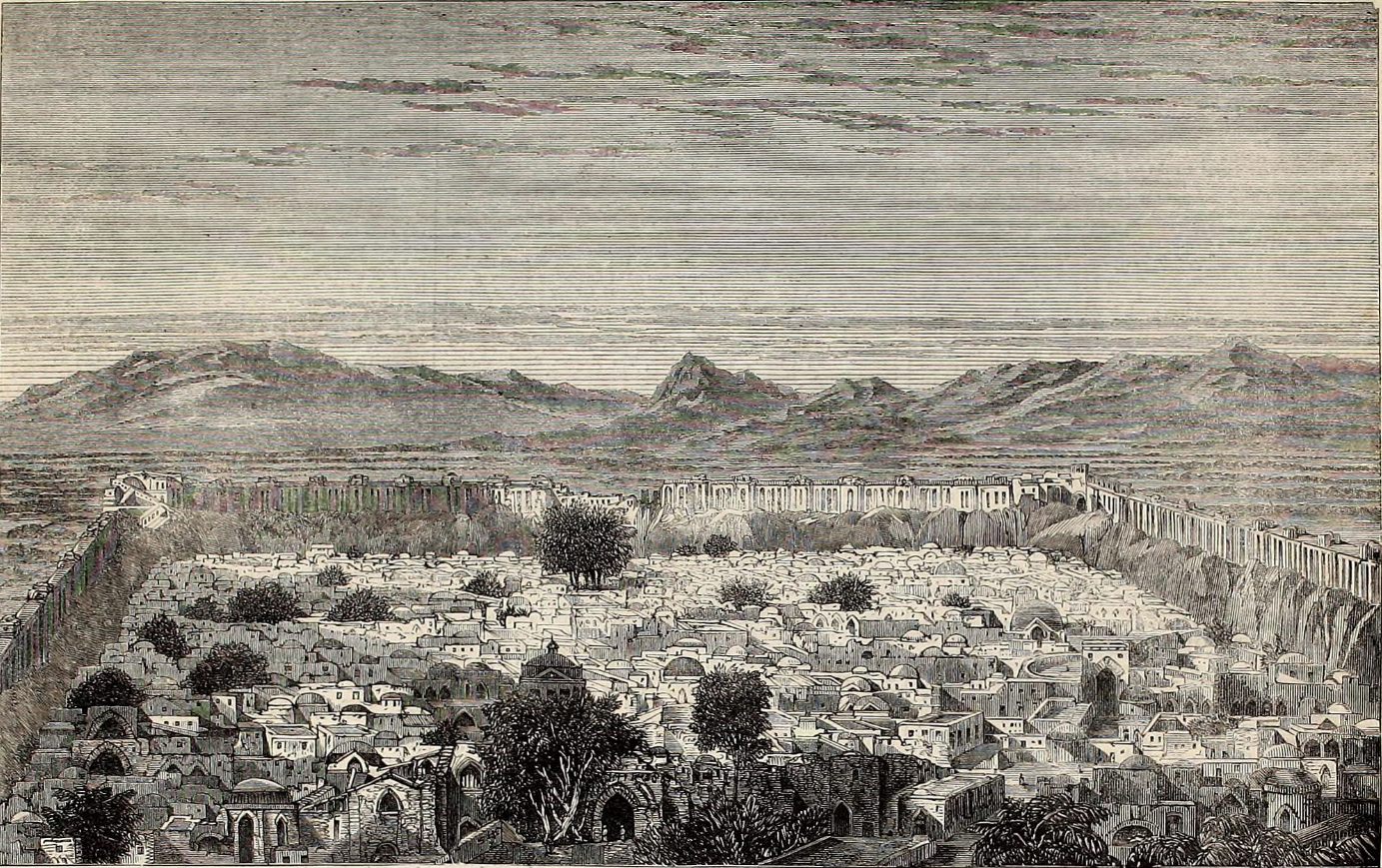
View of Herat from its citadel by The Illustrated London News, dated 1863

In 1807, Firuz al-Din Mirza attempted to capture Mashhad, which Yusuf Ali Khan had secretly urged. The Naqshbandi murshid (teacher) Sufi Islam and the leader of the Sunni clergy in Herat, Hajji Mulla Musa, also supported Firuz al-Din Mirza. However, on 29 June 1807, Firuz al-Din Mirza was defeated at the battle of Shada by Mohammad Vali Mirza's deputy, Mohammad Khan Qajar. 4,000–6,000 Heratis were killed, including Sufi Islam. Mohammad Khan Qajar then besieged Herat, forcing Firuz al-Din Mirza to surrender after forty days and agree to pay two years worth of income. Firuz al-Din Mirza's inability to pay tribute and his suspected plans to regain control of Ghuriyan prompted the next Iranian attack against Herat in July 1811. Firuz al-Din Mirza quickly surrendered when Mohammad Vali Mirza and his army almost reached Herat. He then resumed paying tribute through his son Malik Hossein Durrani.

By the summer of 1813, Mohammad Vali Mirza did not have good relations with Khorasan's aristocracy. The author of Nasekh-ol-tavarikh-e salatin-e Qajariyeh considered this to have been caused by his treatment towards them; "Whenever he detected a hint of rebelliousness among the great ones… he would fly into a rage and abuse their ancestors and descendants with filthy language. The nobles of that territory suffered these ignominies for years unable to give vent to the darkness in their hearts…" After the Iranian territorial losses near the conclusion of the Russo-Iranian war of 1804–1813, the aristocrats of Khorasan decided to take advantage of the situation. The decision to get rid of Mohammad Vali Mirza was made by Eshaq Khan and the other Khorasani aristocrats at a meeting held in the Gorgan Plain.

Just prior to the signing of the Treaty of Gulistan on 13 September 1813, the rebellion started. On 25 August 1813, the environs of Mashhad and royal herds in Chenaran were attacked by the rebels. Mohammad Vali Mirza called Eshaq Khan to his court without realizing that he was the main organizer of the rebellion. Eshaq Khan removed Mohammad Vali Mirza from power after Qarai forces overran Mashhad on 7 September 1813. However, Eshaq Khan's lowly background soon caused the other leaders to reject his claims to leadership, thus weakening the rebellion. The leaders were Reza Qoli Khan Zafaranlu of Quchan, Najaf Qoli Khan Shadillu of Bojnord, Begler Khan Chapeshlu of Dargaz, and Sadat Qoli Khan Baghayirlu of Jahan-Arghiyan. Eshaq Khan's aspirations for independence ended when the aristocrats went back to their homes. On 27 September 1813, Eshaq Khan surrendered to Mohammad Vali Mirza, and was allowed to continue his previous service to the government. Meanwhile, the other leaders still showed signs of rebellion.

In order to defend his father's actions and ask for royal assistance in opposing the other Khorasani aristocrats, Eshaq Khan's son Hossein Qoli Khan Qarai traveled to the royal court in Tehran during the winter of 1813–1814. As a result, in March 1814, the government launched a military operation against the other leaders of the rebellion. During this period, Eshaq Khan acted on his own. Exploiting the weak position of the Iranian government, Firuz al-Din Mirza attempted to capture Ghuriyan. Rather than seeking help from the Iranian court, Mohammad Khan Qarai, Ghuriyan's governor and son of Eshaq Khan, requested the assistance of Kamran Mirza Durrani, who controlled Kandahar. Eager to extend his influence into Khorasan, Kamran Mirza accepted, forcing Firuz al-Din Mirza to flee to the Iranian general Ismail Khan Damghani, who convinced Kamran Mirza to stop pursuing Firuz al-Din Mirza.

Eshaq Khan was believed to be secretly aiding the rebellion of the Khorasani aristocrats as it entered its second year. Fath-Ali Shah launched a military campaign against Quchan and Radkan between June and August in 1815. Eshaq Khan continued his correspondence with Mohammad Vali Mirza's opponents while simultaneously feigning to support the Iranian government. He also made an effort to discredit Mohammad Vali Mirza at the royal court by suggesting in multiple messages that the appointment of a new and competent governor was the only way to end the conflict with Khorasan's aristocrats.

Eshaq Khan's death was ultimately caused by his independence-minded actions and dominance over his territory. In 1816, he and his son Hossein Qoli Khan Qarai (who was now the governor of Torshiz), were strangled at the court in Mashhad under the orders of Mohammad Vali Mirza, who witnessed it. Mohammad Vali Mirza's circumstances did not improve once his biggest opponent was removed, since instability continued to spread throughout Khorasan, especially in the areas that were disputed between Mashhad and Herat. Mohammad Khan Qajar was defeated twice by the combined forces of Mohammad Khan Qarai and the Hazara leadership, and Ghuriyan was lost again. Firuz al-Din Mirza took advantage of the situation by extending his authority into Bakharz and Jam after Mohammad Khan Qajar withdrew to Mashhad.

Fath-Ali Shah came to the conclusion that there was it was impossible to restore the relation between Mohammad Vali Mirza and the Khorasani leaders after learning about the loss of Ghuriyan. He therefore had Mohammad Vali Mirza replaced with another son, Hasan Ali Mirza.

== Legacy and assessment ==
Mohammad Vali Mirza is described in the Persian texts as a wise and skilled astrologer, who was able to foresee the future, and someone who enjoyed traditional customs. However, the British Iranologist Gavin R.G. Hambly described him as "violent and intemperate." According to modern Iranian historian Fatema Soudavar Farmanfarmaian; "Khorasan was indeed a trouble spot managed commendably by the Prince, though the discontent resulting from the rash execution of the Qara'is inflamed the tribes who would plague the province for many years to come."

== Sources ==
- Amanat, Abbas (1997). Pivot of the Universe: Nasir Al-Din Shah Qajar and the Iranian Monarchy, 1831–1896. I.B. Tauris. ISBN 978-1845118280.
- Amanat, Abbas (1999). "Fatḥ-ʿAlī Shah Qājār". In Yarshater, Ehsan (ed.). Encyclopædia Iranica (Online ed.). Encyclopædia Iranica Foundation. ISBN 978-0710090959.
- Ashraf, Assef (2024). Making and Remaking Empire in Early Qajar Iran. Cambridge University Press. ISBN 978-1009361552.
- Bamdad, Mehdi (1972). شرح حال رجال ایران در قرن ۱۲ و ۱۳ و ۱۴ هجری [Biographies of [notable] personages of Iran in the 18th, 19th, and 20th centuries, vol. 4].
- Farmanfarmaian, Fatema Soudavar (2011). "An Iranian Perspective of J. B. Fraser's Trip to Khorasan in the 1820s". Iranian Studies. 44 (2): 217–242. doi:10.1080/00210862.2011.541692. S2CID 162041391.
- Hambly, Gavin R. G. (1991). Avery, Peter; Hambly, Gavin R. G.; Melville, Charles Peter (eds.). The Cambridge History of Iran: From Nadir Shah to the Islamic Republic. Vol. 7. Cambridge: Cambridge University Press. pp. 104–173. ISBN 0-521-20095-4.
- Eslami, Kambiz (1998). "Esḥāq Khan Qarāʾī Torbatī". In Yarshater, Ehsan (ed.). Encyclopædia Iranica (Online ed.). Encyclopædia Iranica Foundation. ISBN 978-0710090959.
- Noelle-Karimi, Christine (2014). The Pearl in its Midst: Herat and the Mapping of Khurasan (15th-19th Centuries). Austrian Academy of Sciences. ISBN 978-3700172024.
