= Mohammad Khan Qaraei-Torbati =

ilkhan of the Qaraei Tribe
- Reign: July 1816–December 1832
- Predecessor: Eshaq Khan Qaraei-Torbati
- Successor: none
- Born: c. 1790; Torbat-e Heydarieh, Qajar Iran
- Died: c. 1870s Bursa, Ottoman Empire
- Spouse: several including a daughter of Amir Hasan Khan Sheybani of Tabas and a daughter of Mohammad Khan of Shahr-e-Now
- Issue: Sons: 1. a son who died before 1831; 2. Yaqoub Khan; 3. a son married to a daughter of Abbas Mirza; 4. Allahyar Khan (lived in Tabriz with his parents and siblings); 5. Abulqasim Khan (lived in exile first in Tabriz before moving to Khurasan and then in exile from 1887 onwards in Karbala); 6. Allah Quli Khan (son of daughter of Amir Hasan Khan Sheybani) lived and died in Tun; Daughters: 1. a daughter married to a Ali Muhammad Khan Nizam ud-Daula of Sadr Isfahani family (died in Najaf); 2. a daughter married to a son of Abbas Mirza; 3. Sardar Khanum married her cousin Abdul Hussain Khan Qarai.
- House: Qaraei tribe
- Father: Eshaq Khan Qaraei-Torbati
- Mother: Navab Khanum (daughter of Najaf Quli Khan Qara Tatar)

Sardar Mohammad Khan Qaraei-Torbati (Persian: سردار محمد خان قرایی تربتی) was one of the wealthiest and most powerful chieftains in Khorasan during the reign of Fath-Ali Shah Qajar.

The Qajar central government attempted to conciliate the new ruler of Turbat by recalling Muhammad Wali Mirza to Tehran, dishonoring him while there, and sending Hasan Ali Mirza Qajar Shoja os Saltaneh in his place. Hasan Ali ventured to Torbat-e Heydarieh to attempt to placate Mohammad Khan for the treacherous murder of his father. The essence of the lies exchanged at their meeting was that Tehran denied any implication in the murder of Eshaq while Mohammad professed allegiance to the Qajars. The deal was sealed with Mohammad granting his sister to Hasan Ali Mirza for marriage. The result of this marriage was Qahreman Mirza Qajar ancestor of famous Qahreman, Qahremani and Shojania families of Khorasan.

After Hasan Ali's departure Mohammad aligned himself with Bunyad Khan Hazara and began a career of depredation and slave dealing. This latter practice gained him covert alliances with the Khan of Khiva and the Emir of Bukhara, a situation that did little to enhance his reputation in Tehran. In 1832, the crown prince, Abbas Mirza, after subduing the Salor of Sarakhs, turned his attention to Mohammad Khan and his renegade tribe. Under the guise of using Torbat-e Heydarieh as a staging ground for his army's invasion of Herat, Abbas moved the royal forces into the Qaraei district where he deceived Mohammad into a meeting that resulted in his capture.

The independence of the Qaraei tribe and the district of Torbat-e Heydarieh ended with Mohammad Khan. The governors of the district were thereafter no longer of the Qaraei tribe but of the Qajar tribe. The chief of the Qarais traditionally served alternate terms of naib and vazir to the Qajar governor for the rest of the 19th century.

After having lived under house arrest in exile in Tabriz, he managed to escape to the Ottoman Empire in March 1862. He took the route of Karbala, Baghdad, Damascus, Istanbul and Edirne. Mohammad eventually died in Bursa approximately at 80 years old which would have been sometime in the 1870s.

== Other names ==
Mohammad Khan was also known as:

- Mohammad Khan Kaleh Kan (Persian: محمد خان کله‌ کن)
- Mohammad Khan Sardar (Persian: محمد خان سردار)
- Mohammad Khan Torbati (Persian: محمد خان تربتی)

== Positions held ==
- Governor of Ghurian 1813–1814
- Governor of Mashhad 1829
- Governor of Torbat-e Heydarieh with his capital being Dowlatabad July 1816–December 1832
- Ilkhan of Qaraei tribe July 1816–December 1832
- Sardar of the Iranian army at Khorasan
