= Eshaq Khan Qaraei-Torbati =

Ilkhan of the Qaraei tribe (1743–1816)

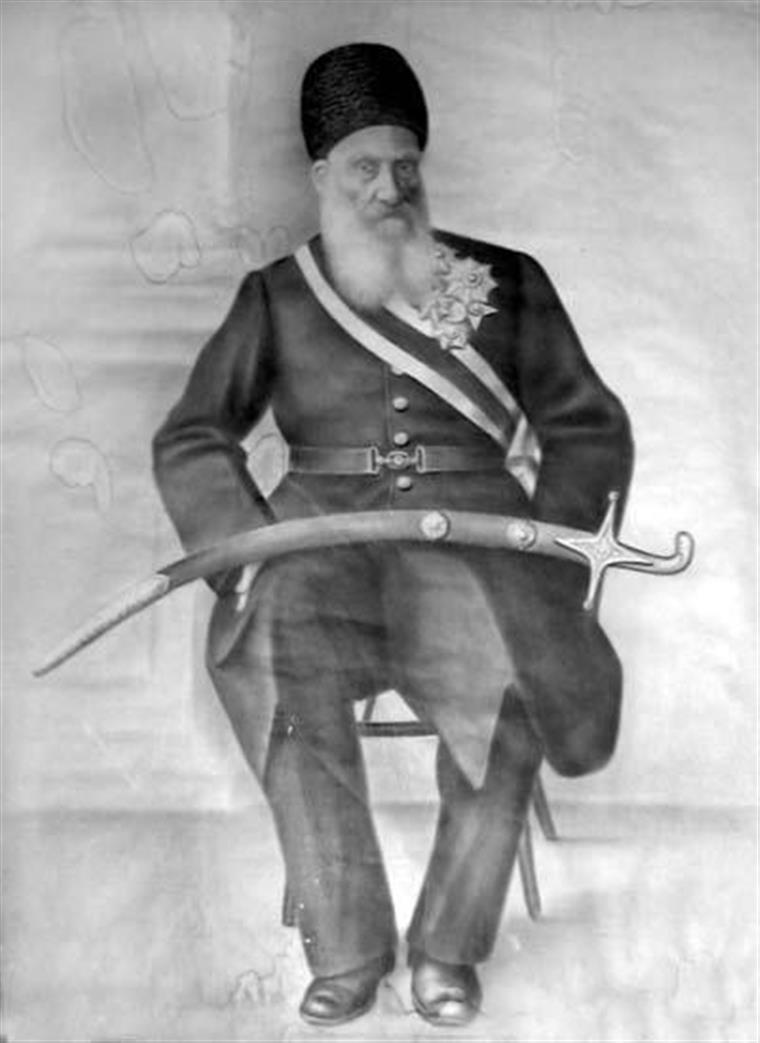
- Portrait of Eshaq Khan Qaraei-Torbati

Il khan of the Qaraei tribe
- Reign: April 1782–8 July 1816
- Predecessor: Najaf Qoli Khan Qara Tatar
- Successor: Mohammad Khan Qaraei-Torbati
- Born: 1743
- Died: 8 July 1816 (aged 72–73); Mashhad
- Buried: Imam Reza shrine
- Spouse: several wives including Navab Khanoom daughter of Najaf Qoli Khan Qara Tatar
- Issue: Sons: 1. Hasan Ali Khan (d.1816); 2. Mohammad Khan Sardar; 3. Ali Khan; 4. Hossein Ali Khan; 5. Mehdi Qoli Khan (d.1886); 6. Mohsen Khan; 7. Ahmad Khan; Daughters: 1. a daughter married to Prince Mohammad Vali Mirza; 2. Marziyeh Khanum married to Prince Hasan Ali Mirza Qajar Shoja os-Saltaneh; 3. Saheb Khanum in 1808 married to Mostafa Qoli Khan son of Mohammad Ibrahim Khan one of the chiefs of the Hazara.
- Father: Haji Mohammad Khan Koohi

Eshaq Khan Qaraei-Torbati (Persian: سردار اسحاق خان قرایی تربتی), was one of the wealthiest and most powerful chieftains in Khorasan during the reigns of Agha Mohammad Khan and Fath Ali Shah. He was fluent in Persian and Arabic.

== Rise to power ==
Originally known by the name of Mohammad Eshaq Khan Koohi (Persian: محمد اسحاق خان کوهی) overcame extraordinary odds to establish himself as a leader of the Qaraei tribe. The son of a Tajik (a term applied to non-Turkic people specially Persians) by the name of Haji Mohammad Khan Koohi (Persian: حاجی محمد خان کوهی) (commonly known as Mohammad Khov (Persian: محمد خو)) who was working for Najaf Qoli Khan Qara Tatar, the chief of the Qaraei tribe. Eshaq grew up alongside his brother as shepherds. He inherited a social position that was inferior to even the lowest member of a military tribe. His father gained the attention of the leader of the Qaraei tribe and was appointed yuzbashi or centurion. Consequently, Eshaq was granted the position of Yessawul (mace bearer) to the chief and used this position to convince the chief of a need for a caravansarai in the then small village of Torbat-e Heydarieh. While undertaking this project the ambitions of Eshaq began to manifest themselves. As Eshaq's project grew, he slowly converted the caravansarai into a fort while simultaneously fomenting quarrels and divisions within the tribe through various intrigues. His plan culminated in Najaf Qoli's being murdered by his own officers with the chief's sons fleeing Khorasan.

Soon afterward, he married the daughter of Najaf Qoli and entered into an alliance with Ahmad Shah Durrani. These maneuvers gained him the leadership of the tribe. As the chief of the tribe, he managed to transform Torbat-e Heydarieh into a prosperous and safe district, while also making a fortune through farming, leasing camels to merchants, and developing an export/import trade.

Eshaq Khan's allegiance to Tehran (and also to Herat) remained nominal, and his display of submission to Agha Mohammad Khan and Fath Ali Shah at the time of their marches on Mashhad in 1796 and 1802, respectively, was anything but genuine. Fath Ali Shah's appointment in 1803 of his young son, Mohammad Vali Mirza, as governor of Khorasan was probably perceived by Eshaq Khan as a move designed to exact his allegiance and thus did not please the ambitious chief). However, he used this opportunity and joined his service and assumed the positions of Sardar (commander of the armies) and Vazir (prime minister). In December 1804 Eshaq Khan Qarai conquered Ghurian.

== Downfall ==
The influence of Eshaq completely overshadowed that of Mohammad Vali, a state of affairs that aroused Eshaq's ambitions. He initiated a conspiracy with the chiefs of Khabushan, Radkan, Chenaran, Darra Gaz, Jahan-Arghiyan, and Bojnord to unseat the governor and assume the reins himself.

The plan was successful and Mohammad Vali was placed under house arrest. After plundering Mashhad on 7 September 1813, Eshaq's co-conspirators began quarreling over the spoils and challenging Eshaq's right to accession. Eshaq assembled those still loyal to him and restored Mohammad Vali to office. In an attempt to make amends he gave the governor one of his daughters in marriage. The result of this marriage was a boy Jafar Qoli Mirza Qajar.

Eshaq undertook a visit to the court in Tehran where he convinced the Shah that Mohammad Vali was incompetent. Fath Ali accordingly issued a farman (royal order) declaring Eshaq as the Hakim of Mashhad, thus relegating the shahzadeh to the position of ornament.

In his turn, Mohammad Vali sneaked off to Tehran. There, he represented Eshaq to be an ambitious and dangerous man whose progress needed to be checked. The Shah became convinced and ordered Mohammad Vali to execute Eshaq.

Finally on 8 July 1816 he and his eldest son, Hasan Ali Khan, were strangled by the order and in the presence of Mohammad Vali Mirza Qajar. The executions, however, only exacerbated the situation, forcing Fath Ali Shah (who also feared an Afghan attack) to remove his son from the post of governor of Khorasan and replace him with his other brother Hasan Ali Mirza Qajar.

== See also ==
- Khanate of Nishapur
- Abbas Mirza
- Shahrokh Shah
- Nader Mirza Afshar
