= Mehdi-Qoli Mirza Qajar =

Qajar Prince

- Saham al-Mulk

Governor of Yazd
- Tenure: 1899–1900
- Successor: Soltan Hossein Mirza
- Died: July 1904; Mashhad, Sublime State of Iran
- Dynasty: Qajar
- Father: Mohammad Vali Mirza

Mehdi-Qoli Mirza Qajar (Persian: مهدی‌قلی میرزا قاجار), titled Saham al-Mulk (سهام‌الملک) was a prince of the Qajar dynasty, a military leader, and an administrator. He was the son of Mohammad Vali Mirza and a grandson of Fath-Ali Shah Qajar.

== Biography ==
Mehdi-Qoli Mirza took part in the Herat campaign, a key military endeavor of the Qajar era, and served as Mir-Akhor (میرآخور; lit. master of the stables) to Morad Mirza, the son of Abbas Mirza. In 1873, he was appointed as the head of Iran's Chaparkhaneh (چاپارخانه; lit.postal system), a vital component of Qajar administrative infrastructure.

In 1885, he was tasked with suppressing a rebellion in Mashhad, demonstrating his administrative skills. He later served as the governor of Yazd from 1899–1900, during which he worked to prevent sectarian violence, including efforts to protect the Babi community. His governorship was succeeded by Soltan Hossein Mirza Jalal ed-Dowleh, the son of Mass'oud Mirza Zell-e Soltan.

=== Custodianship of Astan-e Quds Razavi ===
Between 1902–1904, Mehdi-Qoli Mirza held the position of custodian of the Astan-e Quds Razavi, overseeing the administration of the Imam Reza Shrine in Mashhad. His tenure ended with his death in July 1904.

=== Philanthropy ===
Mehdi-Qoli Mirza donated a substantial portion of his wealth to the Astan-e Quds Razavi, establishing charitable endowments to support the shrine and its associated institutions.
