= Nader Mirza Afshar =

Iranian crown prince of Khorasan (died 1802)

- Mirza
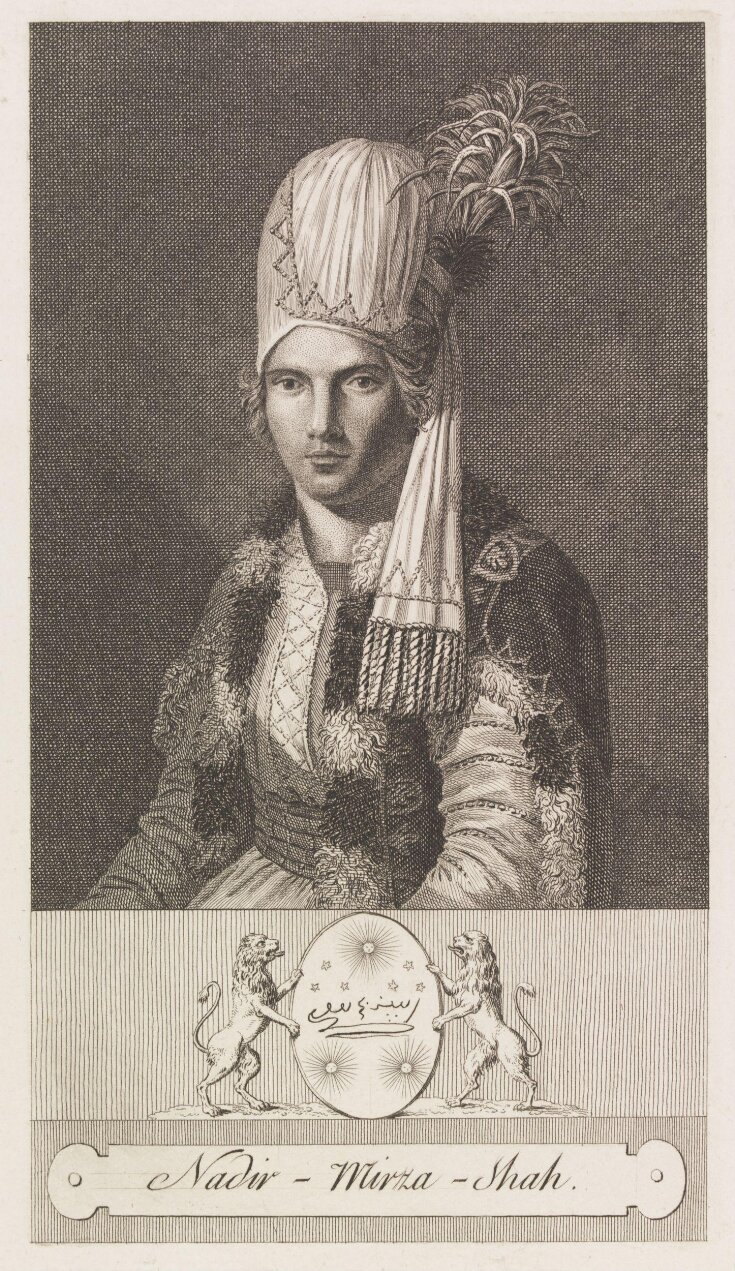
- Engraving of Nader Mirza, 18th or 19th century

Head of the Afsharid Dynasty
- Reign: 1796 - April 1802
- Predecessor: Shahrokh Shah
- Successor: Dynasty disbanded

Ruler of Khorasan
- Reign: June 1797 - April 1802
- Predecessor: Shahrokh Shah
- Successor: Mohammad Vali Mirza
- Born: Between 1756 and 1757; Mashhad, Afsharid Iran
- Died: April 1802 (Aged 42-45); Tehran, Qajar Iran
- Spouse: Unnamed wife
- Issue: Tahmasp Mirza; Khaliq Vardi Mirza; Mahboub Ali Mirza; Ismail Mirza
- House: Afsharid dynasty
- Father: Shahrokh Shah
- Mother: Unnamed Persian mother
- Religion: Twelver Shia Islam

Nader Mirza Afshar (Persian: نادرمیرزا افشار) was an Iranian prince of the Afsharid dynasty and a military leader. He was notably the great-grandson of Nader Shah, the founder of the Afsharid dynasty of Iran. He was the fourth son of Shahrokh Shah, being considered the last head of the Afsharid dynasty itself and of Afsharid Iran.

== Biography ==
Nader Mirza Afshar is believed to have been born somewhere between 1756 and 1757 in Mashhad, the standing Afsharid administrative capital at the time. In Nader's early life, he developed a bitter rivalry with his elder brother, Nasrollah Mirza.

The two brothers engaged in armed clashes particularly often, Nader Mirza eventually forced to escape to Tabas after one of them. Some years later after Nader Mirza's escape, Nasrollah initiated a war for independence against the Durrani subjugation that had been forced onto the Afsharids 15 years prior. Nasrollah sent a dispatch to Tabas to call upon both Nader Mirza and Tabas itself, led by Ali Mardan Khan, for aid after the beginning of a campaign under Ahmad Shah to solidify Durrani suzerainty over Khorasan.

Nader and Nasrollah Mirza would see early success against the Durrani's and Ahmad Shah, Nader Mirza inflicting a decisive victory in battle against Rasul Khan's army at Gonabad, obliterating a quarter of Rasul's force and significantly pushing them back despite being only 14 years of age. Even with this, the numbers of the Durrani army weighed heavy upon Mashhad. Ali Mardan Khan had been slain during battle, and Nader Mirza's inexperience had been shown at Soltanabad, where he was defeated by a significantly larger relief force under Sardar Jahan Khan. These factors all culminated in the submission of the city to Ahmad Shah after a siege.

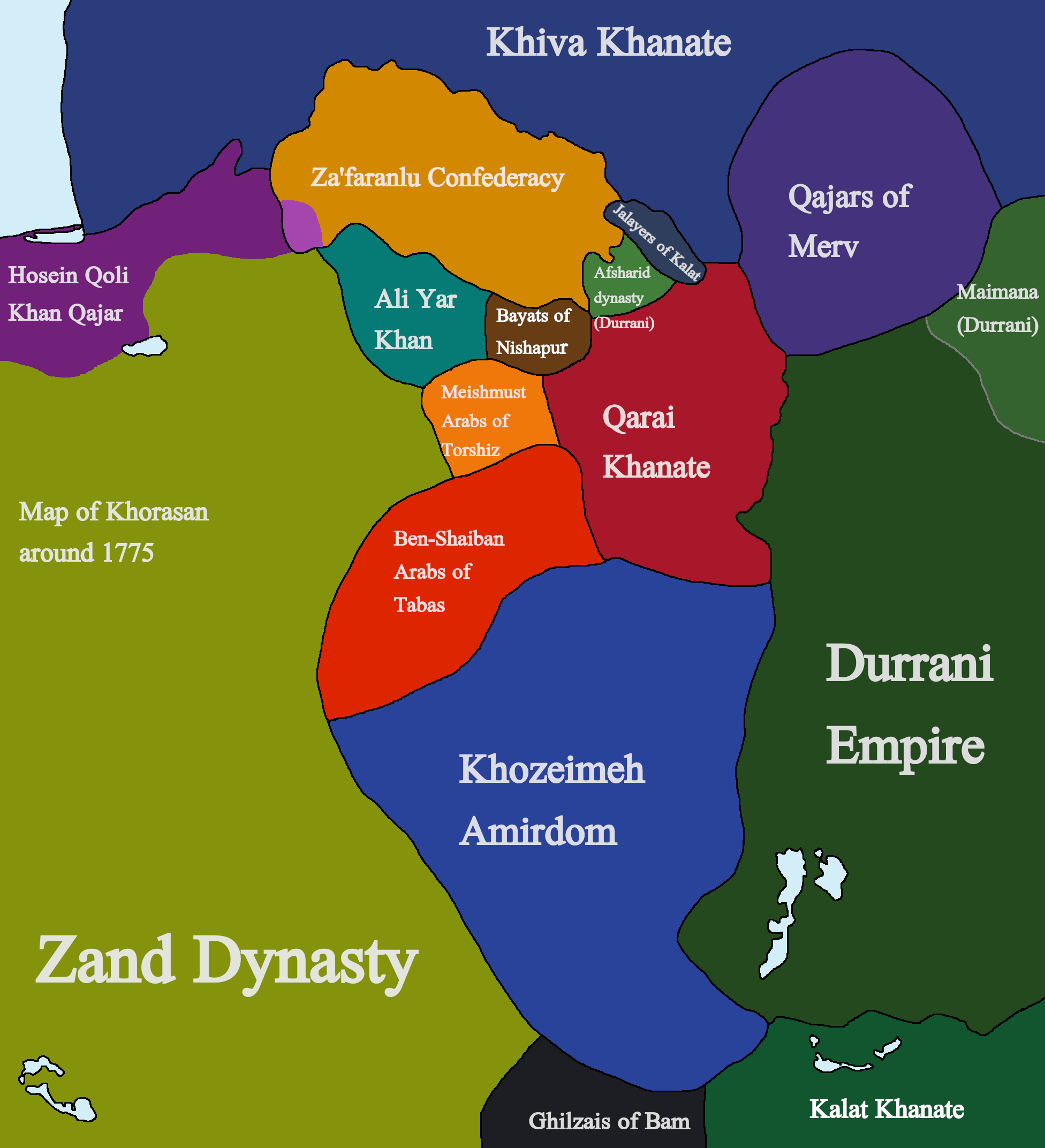
The Afsharid dynasty near its end, as its authority is reduced to Mashhad and the immediate surrounding territory.

The loss against the Durrani's had seen Nasrollah's Kurdish allies abandon him, which weakened his position in Mashhad. In 1775, Nasrollah was ousted from Mashhad by Nader Mirza after a clash, Nasrollah resorting to Shiraz to supposedly gain support against his father and younger brother. This had resulted in Nader Mirza restoring himself as crown prince, solidifying his position in Mashhad. In 1796, Shahrokh Shah was defeated by Agha Mohammad Khan Qajar, the founder of the Qajar dynasty. As a result, Mashhad fell to the Qajar Dynasty, forcing the remaining members of the Afsharid Dynasty, including Nader Mirza himself, to flee the city to Herat. Shahrokh was tortured and killed, Agha Mohammad then installing Mohammad Vali Mirza as Governor of Khorasan in Mashhad.

Upon Agha Mohammad Khan's death in 1797, Fath-Ali Shah Qajar (his heir apparent) ascended the throne. Nader Mirza proceeded to lead the reclamation of Mashhad itself to exploit the existing internal turmoil, succeeding in ousting Mohammad Vali Mirza. Nader would reestablish his control over Mashhad itself and the immediate surrounding area. Following this, several campaigns were led to reestablish Qajar control over the region by Fath-Ali Shah in retaliation.

Fath-Ali Shah’s first and second Khorasan campaigns in June 1798 and June 1800 failed despite much ravaging and destruction by the Qajar troops, being almost completely repelled on each occasion by the numerically inferior Nader Mirza in Mashhad, along with a loose confederation of Kurdish and Qarai khans.

A third campaign in May of 1802 led by Fath-Ali Shah would see relatively more success, resulting in the capture of Mashhad after a lengthy set of three major campaigns. After the chief mujtahid of Mashhad switched allegiances to the Qajars, Nader Mirza was captured and brought to Tehran. He was blinded and had his tongue cut off, being eventually executed in the presence of Fath-Ali Shah in April of 1803, along with his eldest sons Abbas Mirza and Ibrahim Mirza. His other three sons Tahmasp Mirza, Khaliq Vardi Mirza and Mahboub Ali Mirza were blinded by the orders of Fath-Ali Shah. Another son, Ismail Mirza, fled to Hyderabad, Deccan. He settled there with the assistance of Sir John Malcolm.

== Notes ==
- Mohammad Qaneii, History of Torbat-e-Heydariyeh, pp. 103–104.
- On Nader Mirza's birthdate, it would have been required of him to be old enough to lead an army or at least prove his worthiness to nominally command one, of which an age between 12 and 14 fits (comparative to the date of 1770, when Nader Mirza won against the Durrani army at Gonabad). His father, Shah Rokh, was also restored to the crown in 1755, this new stability most likely inciting Mirza's birth. The princes of this period, and specifically the Afsharids, possessed power at a very early age. His elder brother Nasrollah Mirza is believed to have taken control of Khorasan at the mere age of 16, making it not necessarily unusual for such a trend to reoccur.
