= Qutb ad-Din Haydar Mausoleum =

Mausoleum in Iran

Mausoleum of Qotbeddin Heydar آرامگاه قطب الدین حیدر
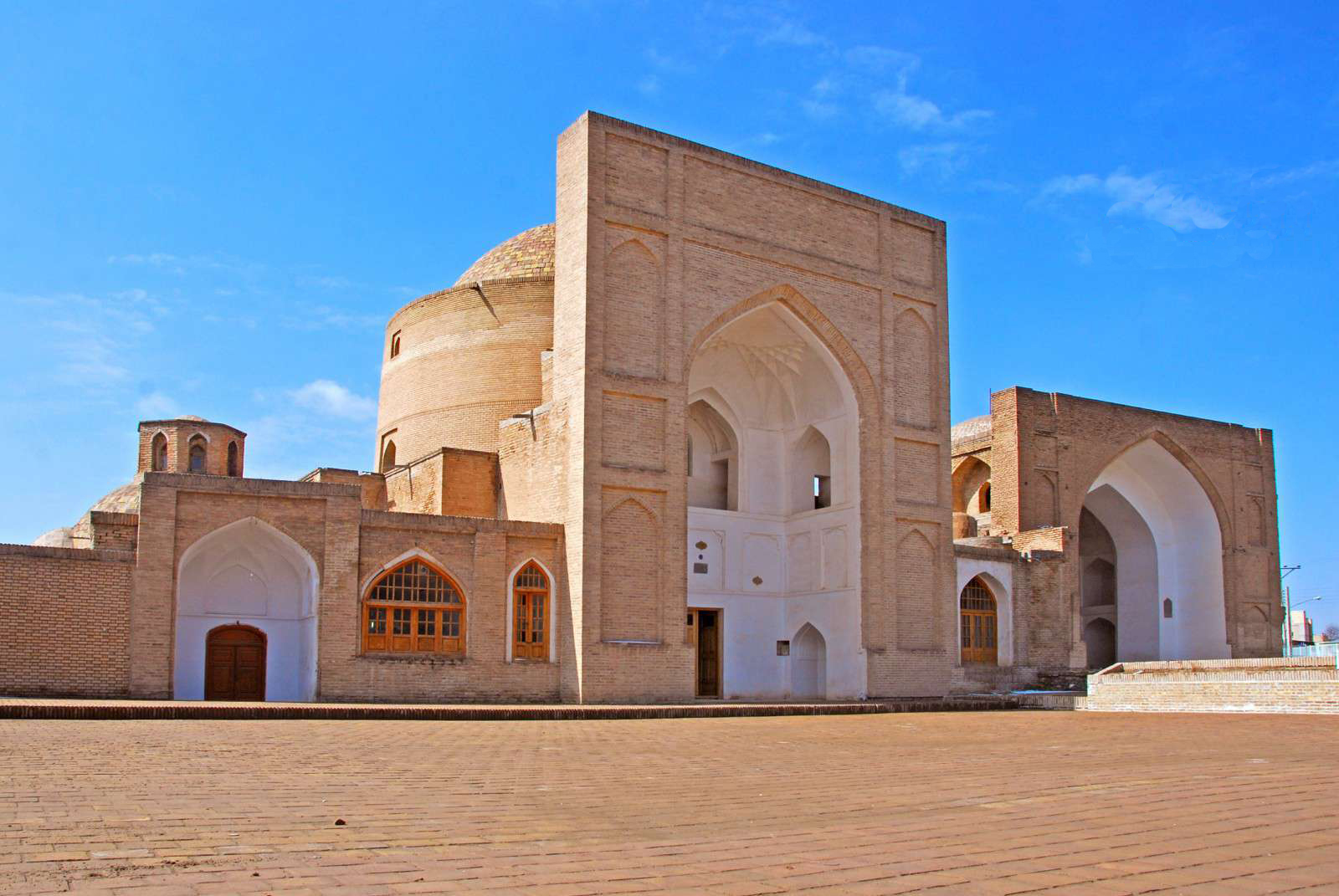

- Location within Iran
- 35°16′33″N 59°12′50″E
- Location: Torbat-e Heydarieh, Khorasan, Iran

Iran National Heritage List
- Official name: Mausoleum of Qotbeddin Heydar
- Type: Mausoleum
- Designated: 1932
- Reference no.: 175
- Conservation organization: Cultural Heritage, Handicrafts and Tourism Organization of Iran

The Mausoleum of Qutb ad-Din Haydar (Persian: مقبره قطب الدین حیدر) is a Timurid-Safavid Mausoleum and mosque belonging to the 13th century Sufi saint Qutb ad-Din Haydar. It is located in Torbat-e Heydarieh, Iran, which was named in his honor.

It was listed among the national heritage sites of Iran with the number 175 on 6 January 1932.
