= Ghorian =

Ghurian Ghoryan, غوريان
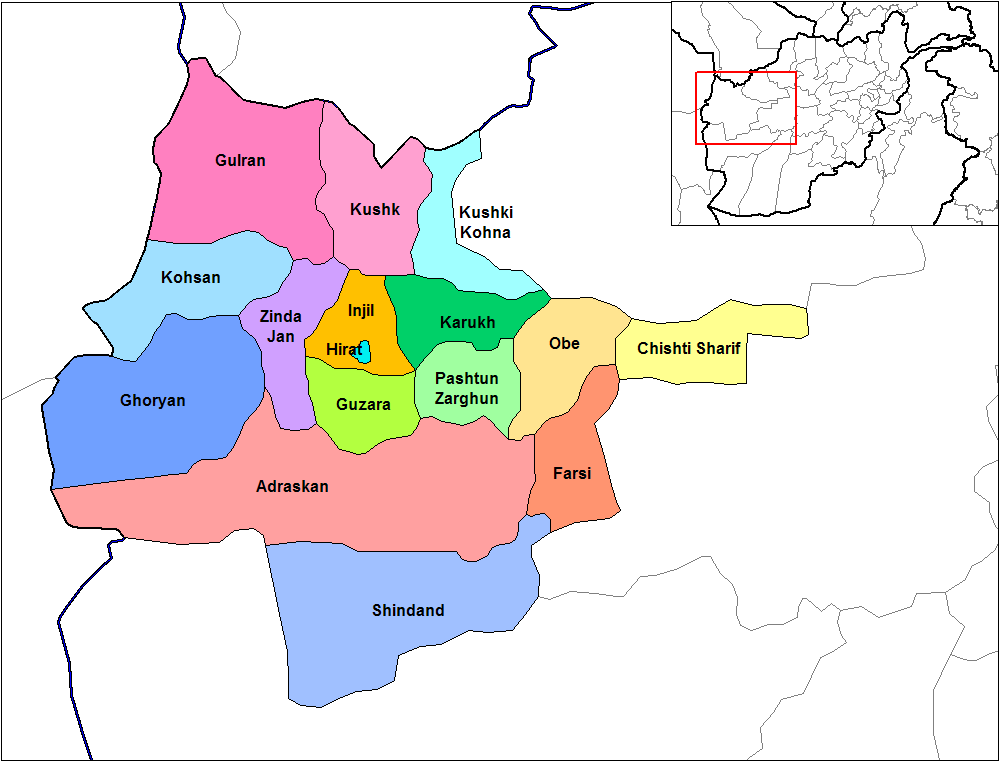
- Coordinates: 34°20′24″N 61°28′12″E
- Country: Afghanistan
- Province: Herat Province
- Elevation: 2,590 ft (790 m)

Population
  - Total: 54,000
- Time zone: UTC+4:30

Ghurian (غوريان; Ghūrīān, Ghoryan, Ġūrīān) is a city and the administrative center of Ghurian District in Herat Province, Afghanistan. It is 790 m high with a population of more than 54,000 people. It is situated south of the Hari River along the Mashhad-Herat highway at 34.34°N 61.47°E. There is a local TV station and a health center. Ghurian is close to the old city of Pushang. In 2020 Ghurian was connected by rail to Khaf in Iran.

In the 19th century, Ghurian was a strategic town on the border between Herat and Iran, as one of the four provinces of the Principality of Herat. It frequently swapped hands between the local chieftains. It was part of the Durrani Empire under Ahmad Shah, but was taken by the chieftain of Torbat-e Heydarieh, Eshaq Khan, in 1804. In 1813-14 it was briefly held by Firuz al-Din, the ruler of Herat, but was soon restored to Eshaq Khan. When he died in 1816 it was taken by Banyad Khan Hazara, but later that same year it was captured by Firuz al-Din again and held until 1818, when Iran captured it and gave it to Qilij Khan Timuri. It was later taken by Mohammad Khan Qara'i, who held it until Qajar authorities deposed him in 1833. It was then taken by the Heratis until 1837, when Iran captured it and held it until 1841.

== See also ==
- Herat Province
