= Ghorian District =

Ghorian District ولسوالی غوریان
- District
- Location within Afghanistan
- Coordinates: 34°20′38″N 61°28′47″E
- Country: Afghanistan
- Province: Herat Province
- Capital city: Ghorian

Area
  - Total: 7,385 km^{2} (2,851 sq mi)

Population (2012)
  - Total: 85,900
  - Density: 11/km^{2} (28/sq mi)
- Time zone: UTC+04:30 (Afghanistan Time)

The Ghorian District (Pashto: ولسوالی غوریان) is one of the districts of Herat Province in Afghanistan. It has an estimated population of about 85,900 residents as of 2012. Other sources provide much higher numbers. Ghorian serves as the capital of the district.

Ghorian District is bordered by Kohsan District in the north; Zendeh Jan District in the east; Adraskan District in the south and southeast; and Khorasan province of Iran in the west and northwest. The Hari River flows through the northeastern end of the district. During the 2023 Herat earthquakes, many houses in Ghorian district were completely destroyed.

== Economy ==
Most residents of Ghorian district are involved in the sectors of agriculture, mining, trade and transport. Recently a rail line between Iran and Afghanistan was built in this district.

== See also ==
- Districts of Afghanistan
