= Durrani campaign in Khorasan (1769–1770) =

Third Durrani Campaign to Khorasan

Durrani Campaign to Khorasan (1769–1770)
- Part of Persian–Afghan Wars
| Date | 1769 – 9 June 1770 |
| Location | Khorasan, Iran (Mashhad, Gonabad, Soltanabad) |
| Result | Durrani victory |

Belligerents
| Durrani Empire | Afsharids |

Commanders and leaders
| Ahmad Shah Durrani; Sardar Jahan Khan; Rasul Khan; Mir Nasir Khan I | Shahrokh Shah; Nasrullah Mirza; Nader Mirza Afshar; Ali Mardan Khan † |

The Afghan Durrani Empire, led by Ahmad Shah Durrani, fought a campaign in Khorasan between 1769 and 1770, against Afsharid Iran. It was his third Khorasan campaign, after those of 1749–1751 and 1754–1755.

== Background ==
Upon hearing of Afghan difficulties in the Punjab, Nasrullah Mirza, son of the Afsharid ruler Shahrokh Shah, began preparing to declare independence. He first attempted to secure aid from Karim Khan Zand to no avail, before receiving support from the Kurds and raising an army in Chenaran. Ahmad Shah began marching from Herat to Khorasan between 1769 and 1770, occupying Torbat-e Jam and Langar. Nasrullah immediately rushed back to Mashhad, while Ahmad Shah arrived and besieged the city.

== Campaign ==
Nasrullah dispatched Nader Mirza Afshar to try and seek aid, which he successfully did so from the chief of Tabas, Ali Mardan Khan. The siege at Mashhad persisted, and sortie attempts against the Afghans were made. Reinforcements under Nadir Mirza and Ali Mardan began arriving, however, and Ahmad Shah dispatched his general, Rasul Khan to battle against them. The Afghan contingent was repelled at Gonabad, leading to Ahmad Shah sending a second army under Jahan Khan and Nasir Khan, which defeated the Persians, slaying Ali Mardan Khan and pursuing Nader Mirza as far as Soltanabad.

== Aftermath ==
Not wishing to fire upon the city as it contained the Imam Reza shrine, negotiations were opened and successfully saw Shahrokh submit again to Afghan suzerainty. Shahrokh also offered his daughter, Gauhar-Shad in marriage to Timur Shah Durrani, which was accepted, with the marriage completed in the Afghan camp. Despite the surrender of Shahrokh and Nasrullah, Ahmad Shah had no intention of directly annexing Khorasan, and instead left Shahrokh to rule under Afghan suzerainty, who also furnished troops to the Afghan army. To ensure loyalty, one of Shahrokh's sons, Yazdan Bakhsh, was taken as hostage. Ahmad Shah began the march back to Kandahar on 9 June, ending his final military campaign.
