= Torbat-e Heydarieh =

City in Razavi Khorasan province, Iran

Torbat-e Heydarieh تربت حيدريه
- City
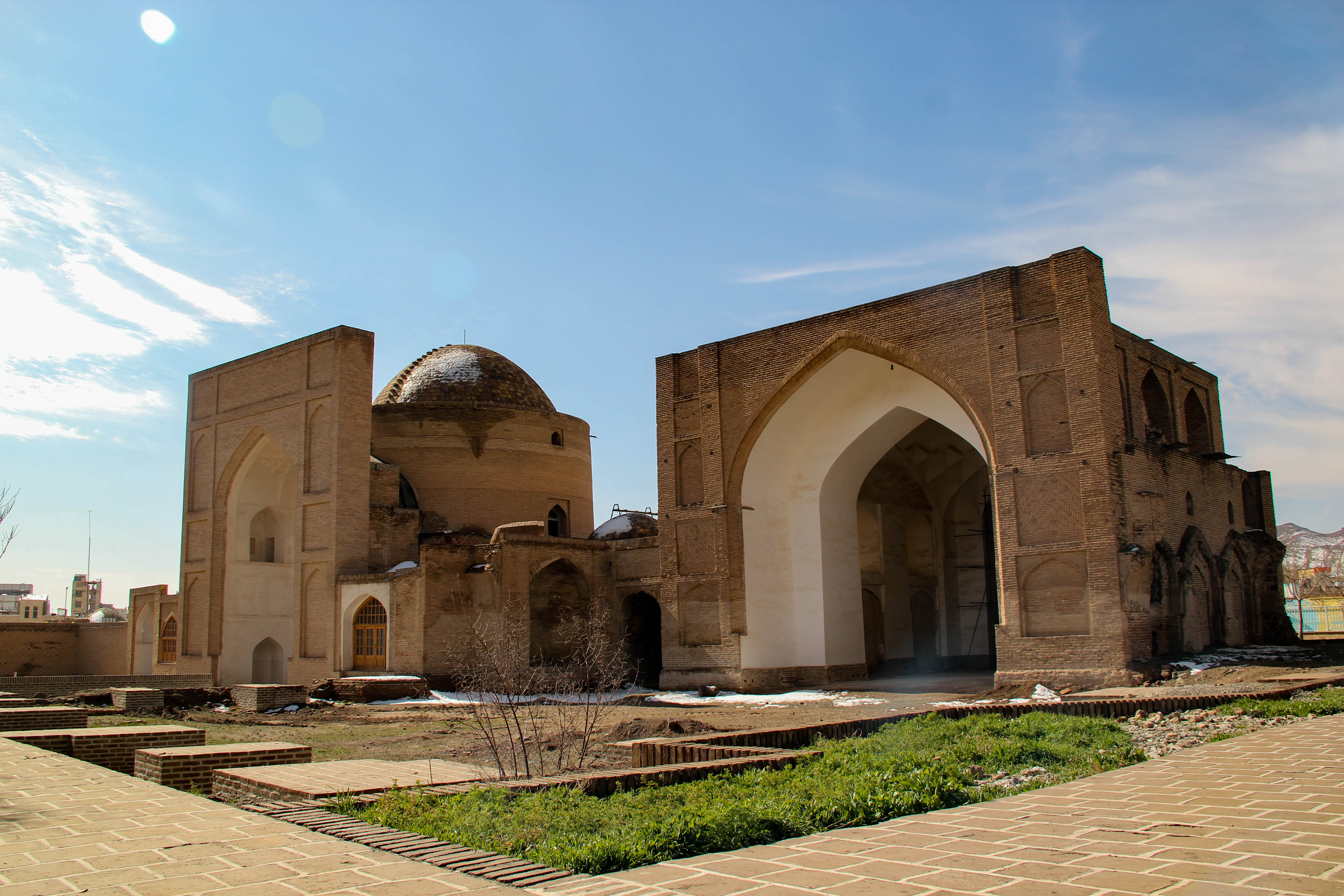
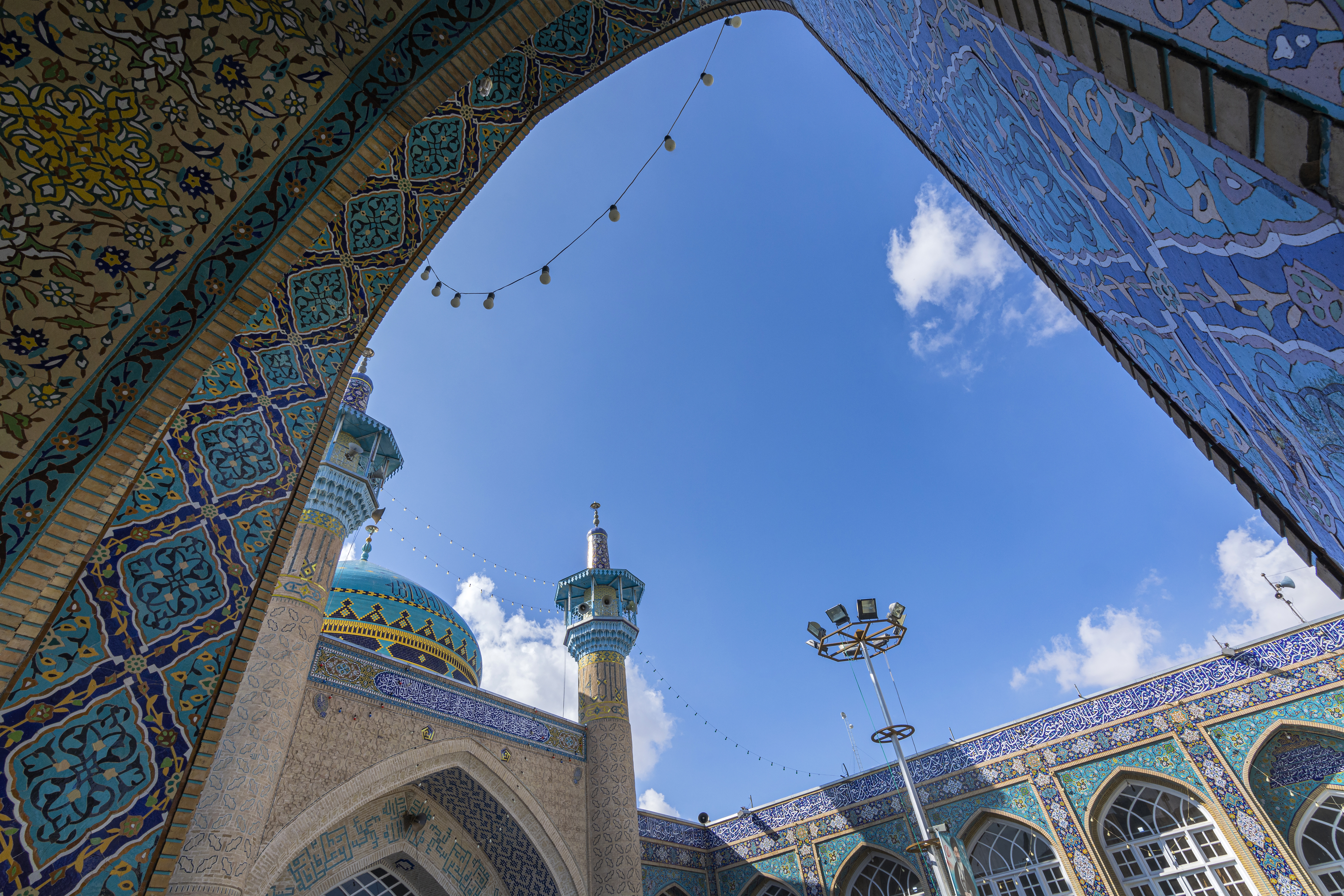
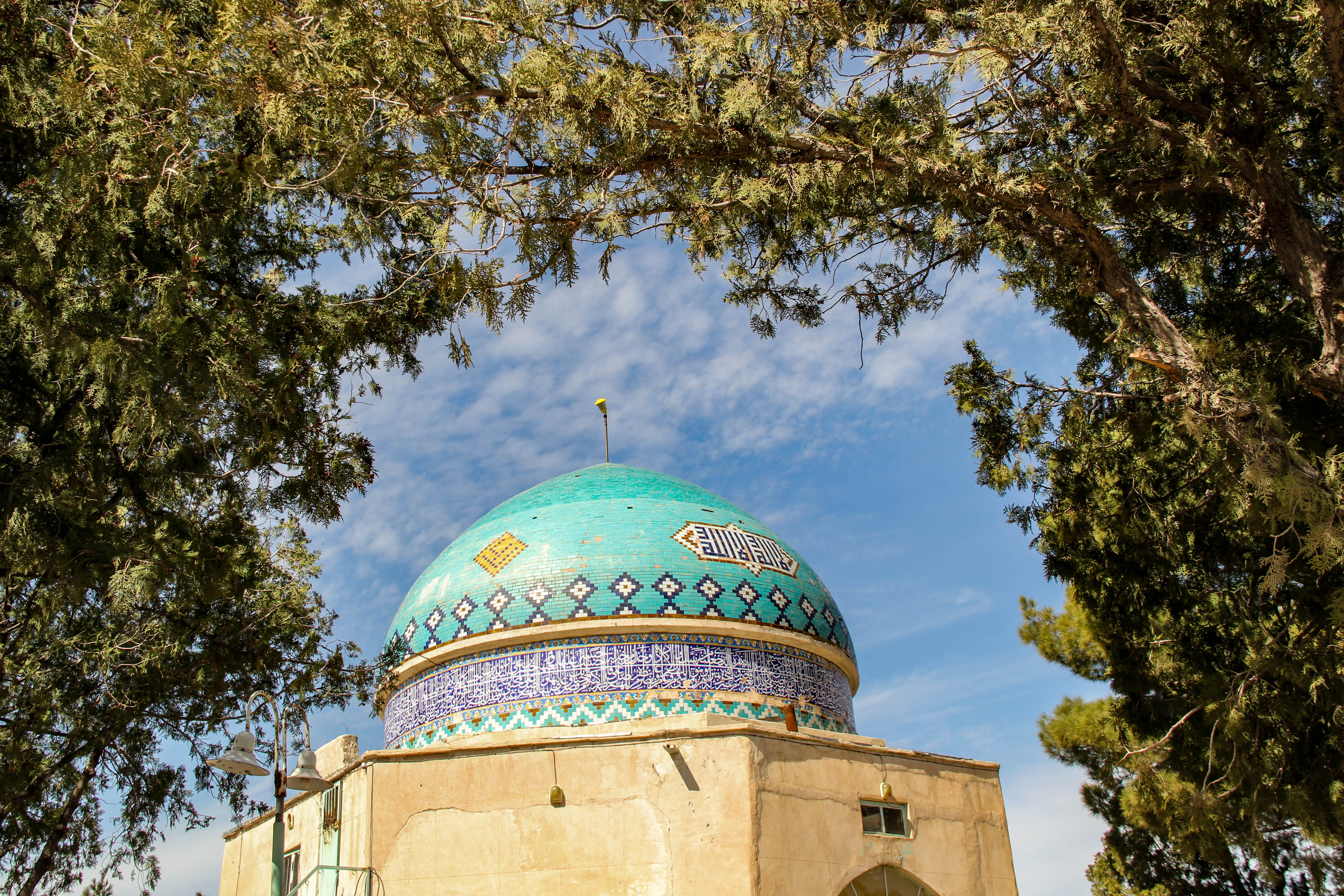
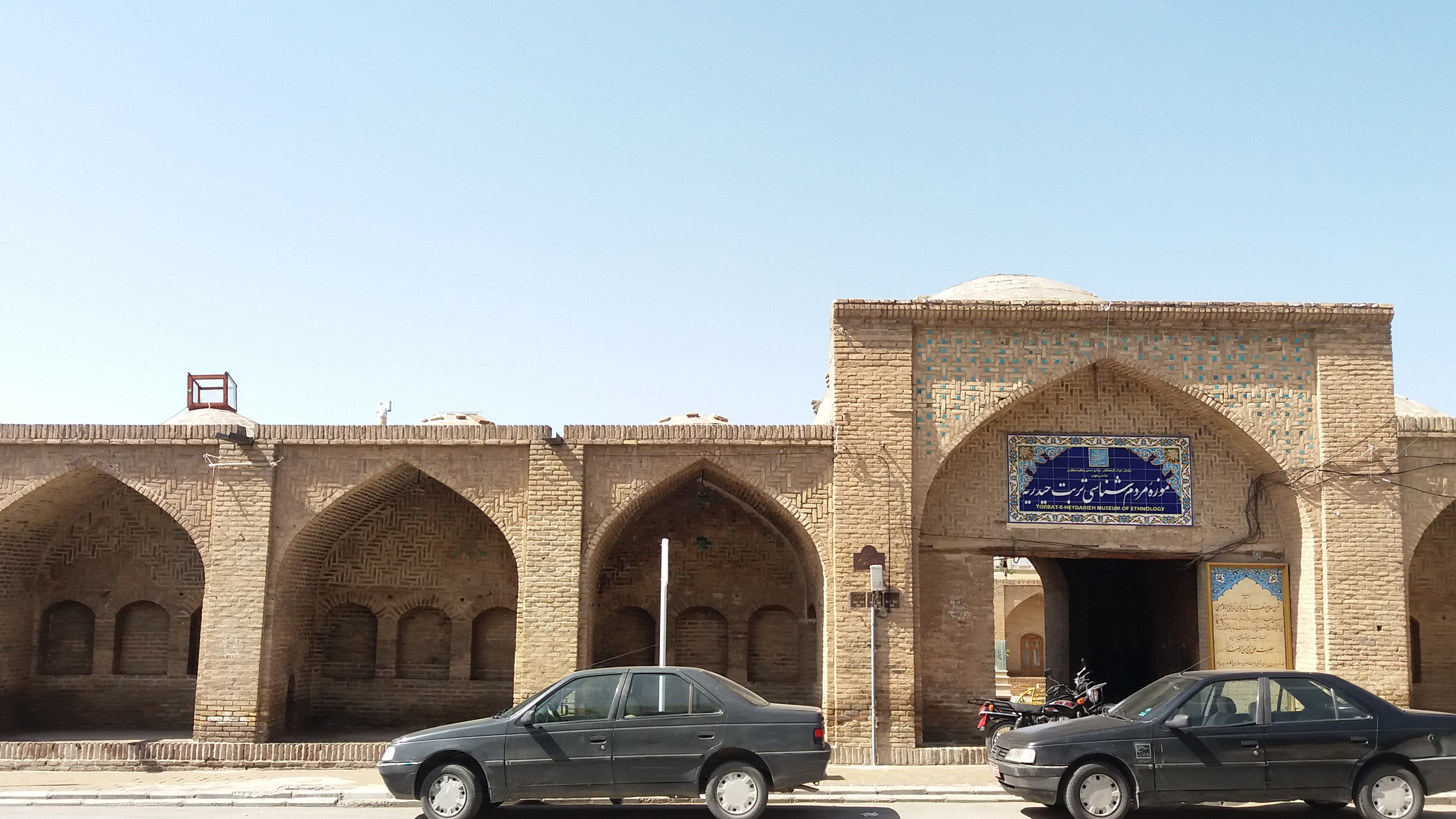
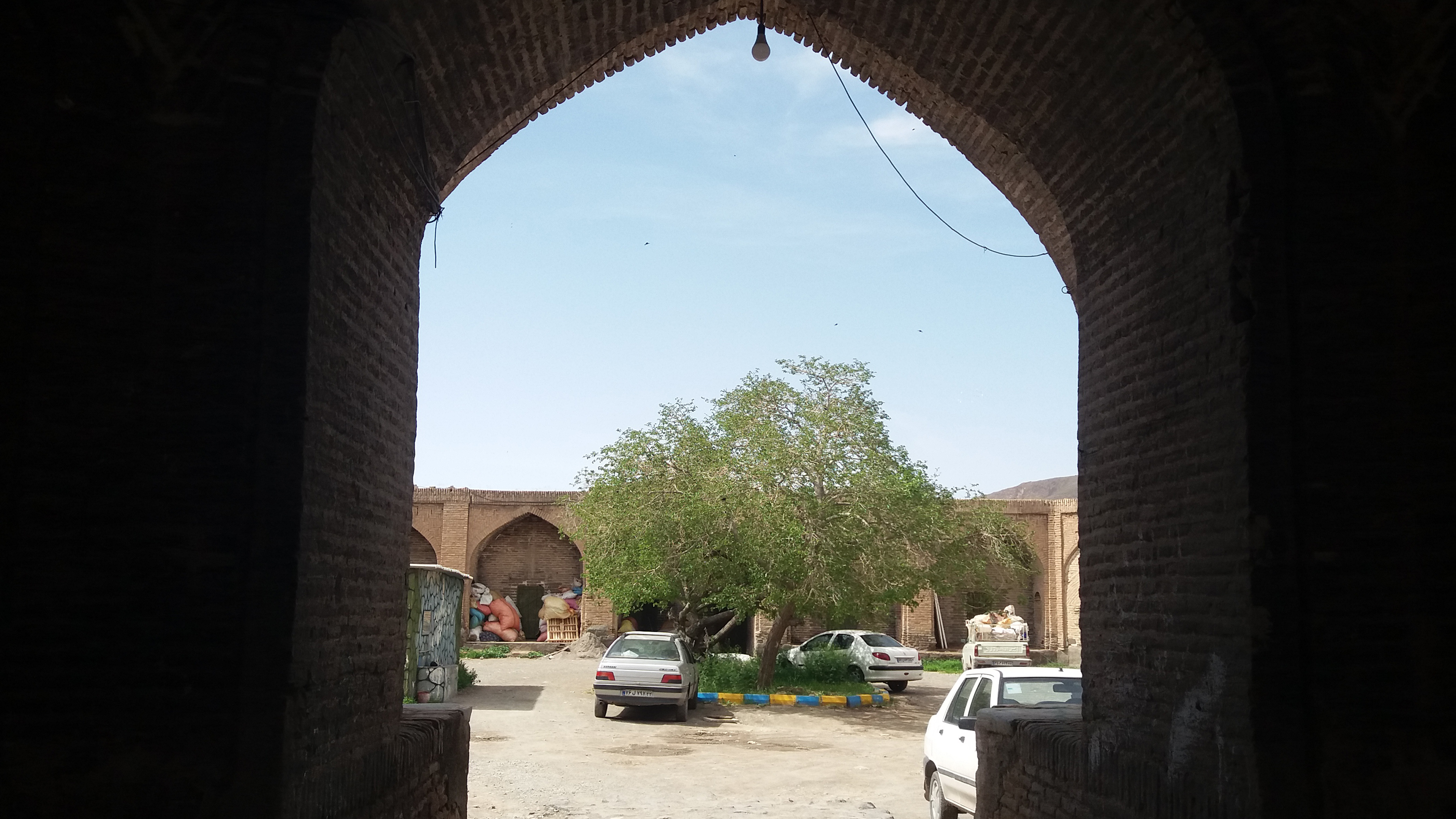
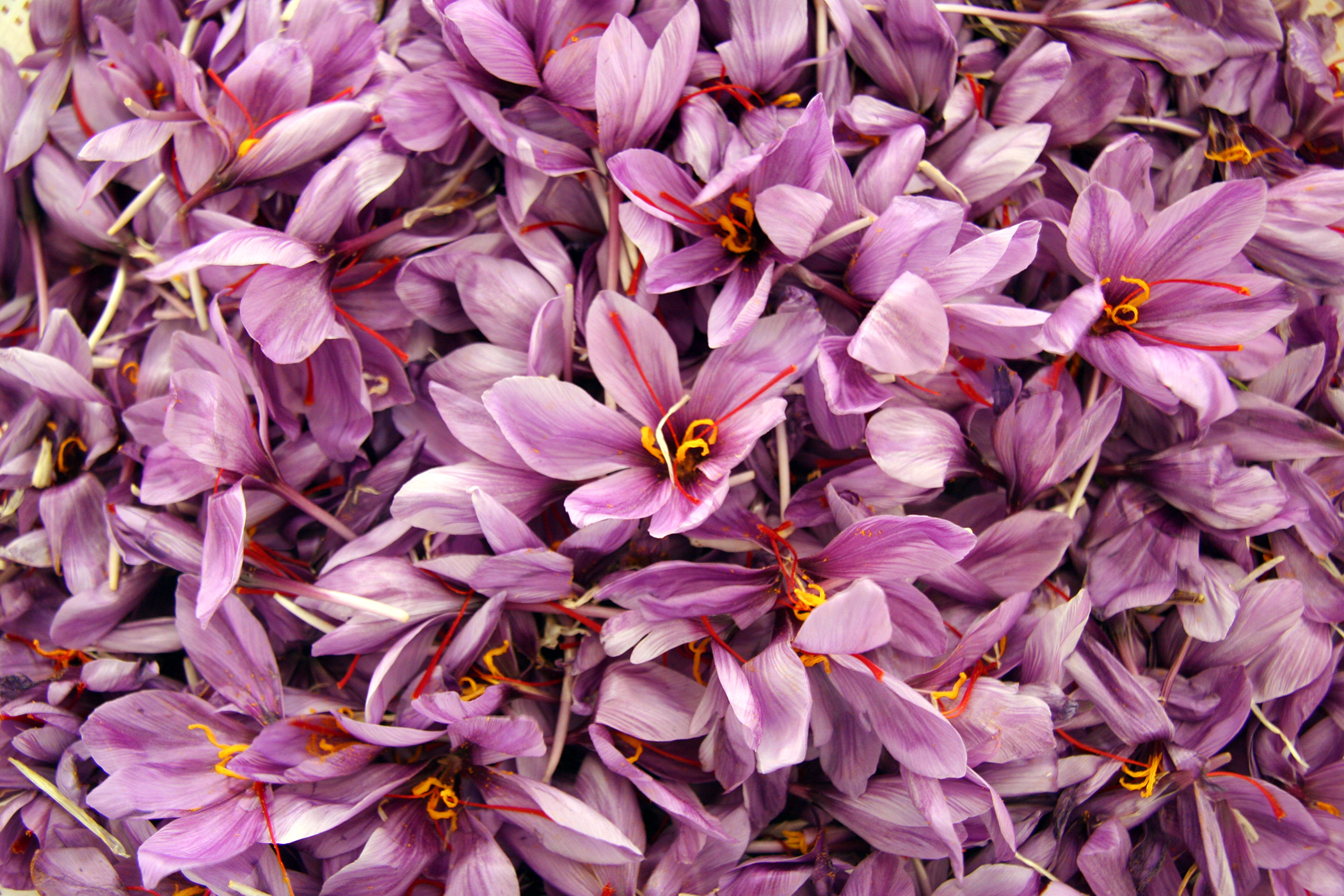
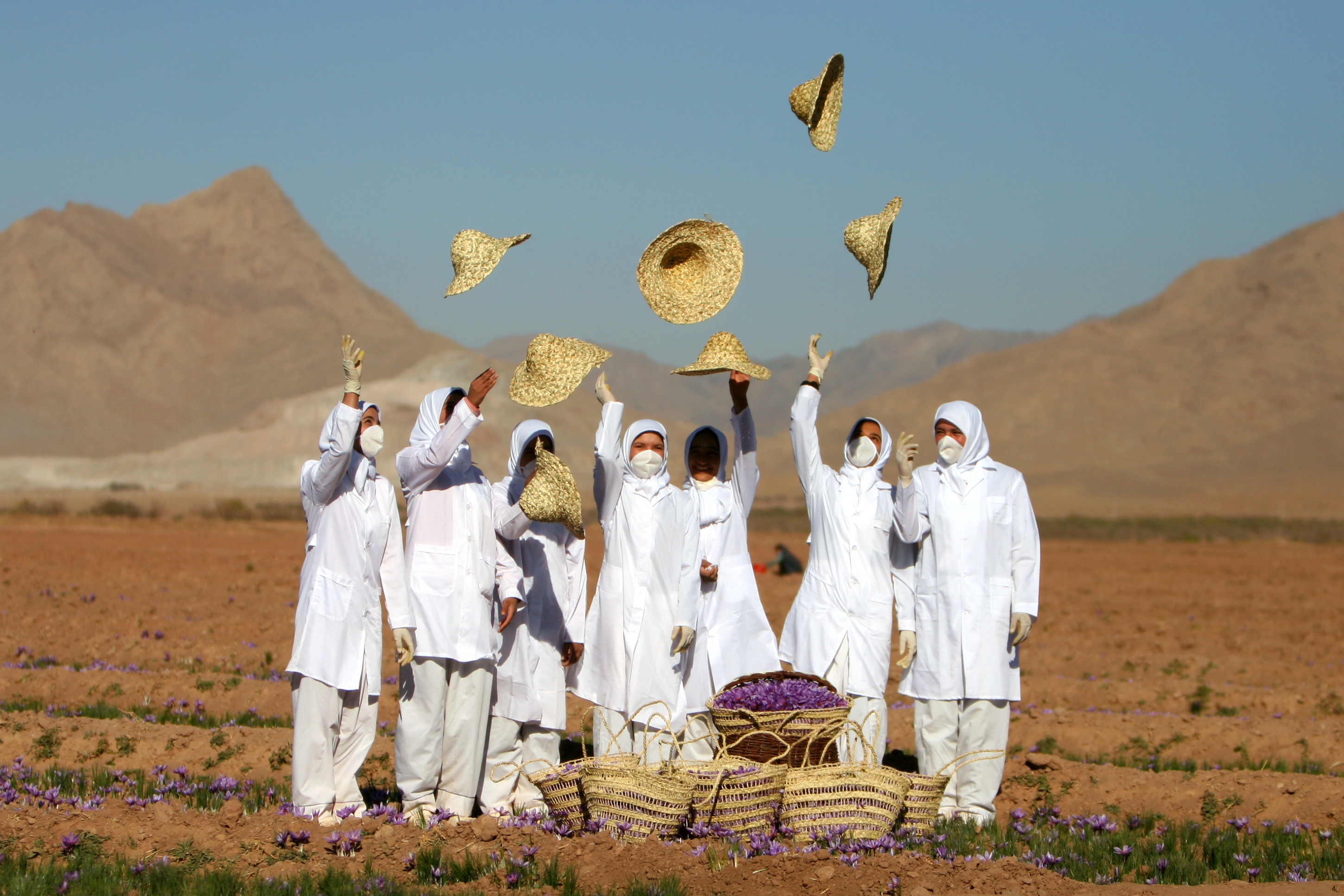
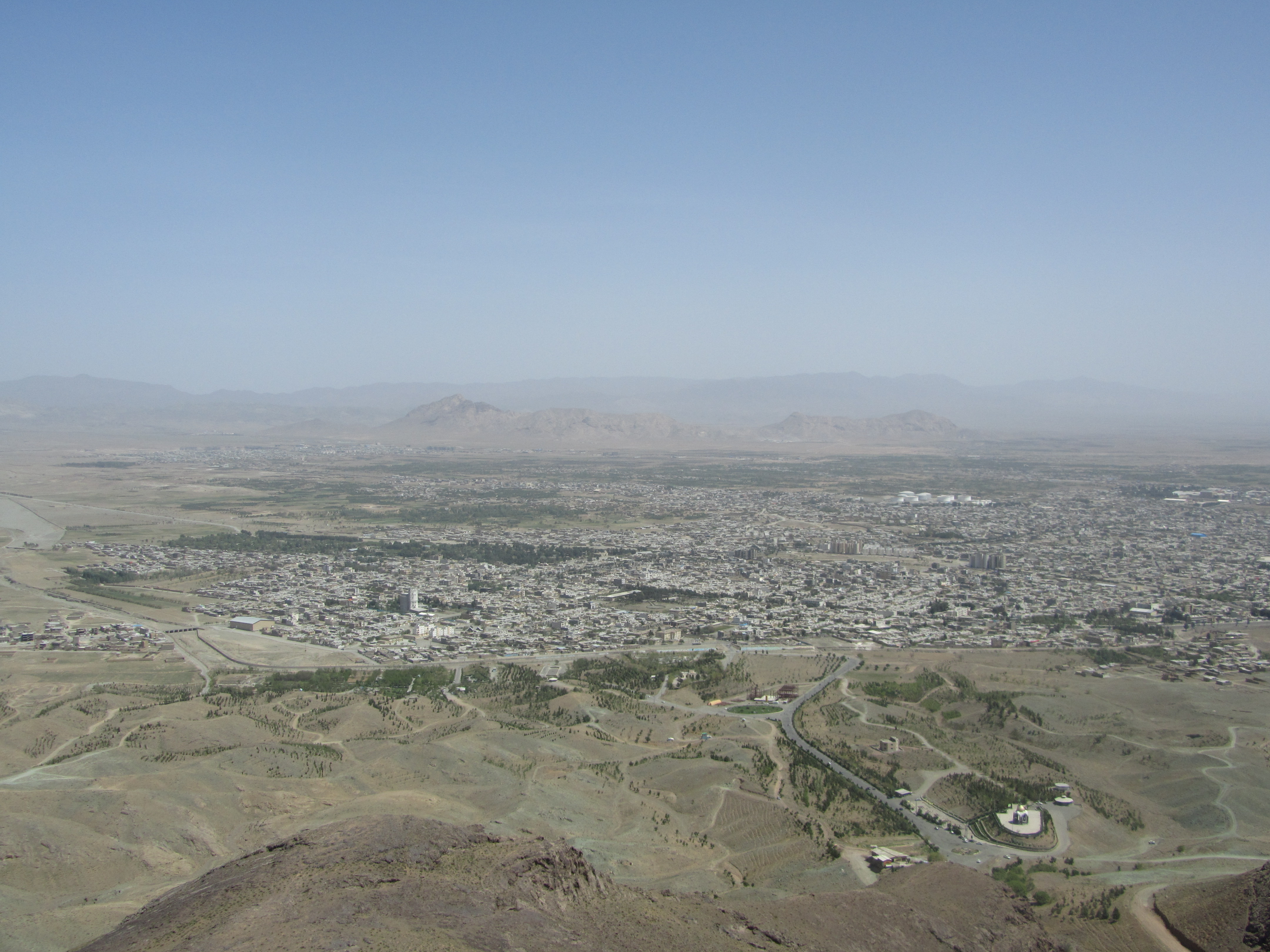
- Torbat-e Heydarieh.
- Nicknames: the Capital of Persian Red Gold or the Capital of Red Gold of Iran or the Saffron City
- Location within Iran
- Coordinates: 35°17′14″N 59°13′19″E
- Country: Iran
- Province: Razavi Khorasan
- County: Torbat-e Heydarieh
- District: Central

Population (2016)
  - Urban: 140,019
- Time zone: UTC+3:30 (IRST)

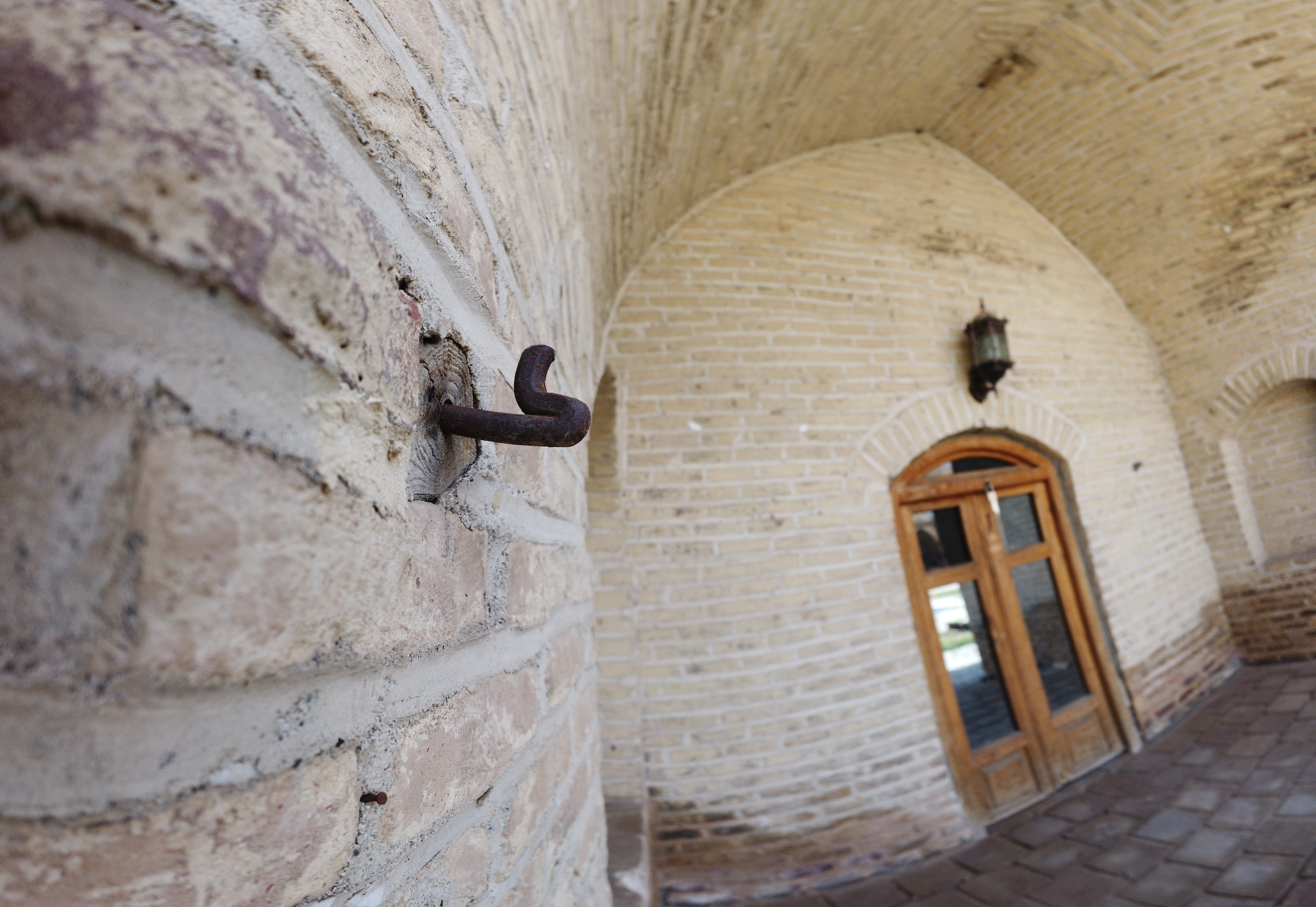
A room in Tabasi Caravanserai - Photo by Jalal Mirzaei

Torbat-e Heydarieh (Persian: تربت حيدريه) (Note: Also known as Torbat, Torbat-e Heydari, Torbate Heydari, Turbat-i-Haidari, and Turbet-i-Haidari) is a city in the Central District of Torbat-e Heydarieh County, Razavi Khorasan province, Iran, serving as capital of both the county and the district. The closest major city to Torbat-e Heydarieh is Mashhad, which is 175 kilometres (109 mi) away.

== Etymology ==
The name Torbat in Persian means burial place, thus the name of the city means Burial Place of Heydar, named after Qutb ad-Dīn Haydar a Sufi mystic whose tomb lies in the heart of the city.

In ancient times this city was known as Zaveh, and in the 19th century it was known as Torbat-e Ishaq Khan or Torbat-e Isa Khan after Ishaq Khan Qaraei the powerful chief of the local Qarai Turks who ruled as a semi-autonomous governor of Torbat-e Heydarieh from 1775 to 1816. It derives its present name from the turbet or tomb of a holy man named Kutb ed din Haidar, the founder of the ascetic sect of dervishes known as the Heydaris. He died c. 1230 and is buried in a large domed building a short distance outside the town.

== History ==
Following the Mongol invasion of Iran, the people of Zaveh (Old Torbat) were the first victims of the Mongol invasion. At the same time, Qutbuddin Haidar, a famous sixth-century mystic who had long resided in the city of Zaveh, died. Torbat-e Heydarieh became a city after the Safavid period. In fact, the city flourished about two hundred years ago, during the reign of Ishaq Khan Qaraei, one of the Khans and political figures of the Qajar era. Ishaq Khan renovated and developed the city and it created such a massive change in the city that this city has become known as Ishaq Khan Torbat for a long time. Prior to World War II, the British and Russian consulates were located in Torbat-e Heydarieh, in the Bagh-e-Soltani area of the city, indicating the city's political and economic importance at the time.

== Demographics ==
=== Language ===
The people of Torbat-e Heydarieh speak Persian and the Khorasani dialect, which is very close to the dialect of other cities of Khorasan, especially that of Mashhad. Books of poems with the Torbati accent such as Samandar Khan Salar written by Ali Akbar Abbasi Fahandari and also Torbati shout by Mohammad Ghahraman have been written.

=== Population ===
At the time of the 2006 National Census, the city's population was 119,360 in 31,869 households. The following census in 2011 counted 131,150 people in 37,807 households. The 2016 census measured the population of the city as 140,019 people in 43,029 households.

== Geography ==
=== Location ===
The city is located in the center of Razavi Khorasan province in Iran. This city is famous for its Zafaran (Saffron) fields. Torbat-e Heydarieh is the world's largest Saffron (or Zafaran in Persian) producer Hence the nickname "Capital of the Red Gold of Iran" has been given to it.

==== Red Gold Capital ====
70 percent of the saffron production in Khorasan Razavi Province, as well as 86 percent of the country's silk yarn, is produced in Torbat Heydariyeh County and its two neighboring counties, Zaveh and Mahvalat, which were considered part of Torbat Heydariyeh until recently.

=== Climate ===
Torbat-e Heydarieh has a cold semi-arid climate (BSk) according to the Köppen climate classification.

Climate data for Torbat-e Heydariyeh (1991-2020)
Month	Jan	Feb	Mar	Apr	May	Jun	Jul	Aug	Sep	Oct	Nov	Dec	Year
Record high °C (°F)	17.6 (63.7)	24.9 (76.8)	30.7 (87.3)	32.2 (90.0)	36.1 (97.0)	40.0 (104.0)	40.6 (105.1)	40.4 (104.7)	36.2 (97.2)	34.0 (93.2)	26.0 (78.8)	23.6 (74.5)	40.6 (105.1)
Mean daily maximum °C (°F)	6.9 (44.4)	9.3 (48.7)	14.6 (58.3)	21.2 (70.2)	26.9 (80.4)	31.7 (89.1)	33.0 (91.4)	31.9 (89.4)	28.8 (83.8)	22.8 (73.0)	14.8 (58.6)	9.4 (48.9)	20.9 (69.6)
Daily mean °C (°F)	0.8 (33.4)	3.2 (37.8)	8.2 (46.8)	14.6 (58.3)	20.3 (68.5)	25.3 (77.5)	27.0 (80.6)	25.4 (77.7)	21.2 (70.2)	14.9 (58.8)	7.8 (46.0)	3.0 (37.4)	14.3 (57.7)
Mean daily minimum °C (°F)	−4.1 (24.6)	−1.9 (28.6)	2.5 (36.5)	8.1 (46.6)	13.2 (55.8)	17.9 (64.2)	20.3 (68.5)	18.3 (64.9)	12.9 (55.2)	7.4 (45.3)	1.9 (35.4)	−2.0 (28.4)	7.9 (46.2)
Record low °C (°F)	−24.6 (−12.3)	−18.6 (−1.5)	−10.0 (14.0)	−4.8 (23.4)	0.5 (32.9)	7.0 (44.6)	11.0 (51.8)	7.8 (46.0)	0.7 (33.3)	−7.0 (19.4)	−14.5 (5.9)	−14.8 (5.4)	−24.6 (−12.3)
Average precipitation mm (inches)	38.5 (1.52)	42.6 (1.68)	56.6 (2.23)	36.3 (1.43)	21.0 (0.83)	3.0 (0.12)	0.9 (0.04)	0.7 (0.03)	1.0 (0.04)	7.4 (0.29)	17.5 (0.69)	25.3 (1.00)	250.8 (9.87)
Average precipitation days (≥ 1.0 mm)	5.3	5.7	6.7	5.1	3.7	0.6	0.2	0.2	0.2	1.1	2.9	4.1	35.8
Average relative humidity (%)	67	64	58	50	39	28	26	25	28	37	52	62	44.7
Average dew point °C (°F)	−5.2 (22.6)	−3.9 (25.0)	−0.8 (30.6)	2.8 (37.0)	4.3 (39.7)	4.6 (40.3)	5.1 (41.2)	3.1 (37.6)	0.6 (33.1)	−1.2 (29.8)	−2.8 (27.0)	−4.5 (23.9)	0.2 (32.3)
Mean monthly sunshine hours	183	186	213	251	310	358	384	373	323	288	214	184	3,267
Source: NOAA NCEI

== Economy ==
Torbat Heydariyeh has two industrial towns and the most important industrial production units of the city include Torbat Heydariyeh Sugar Factory, Zarmehr Gold, Zarrin Tile, Kaolin Factory, also products such as milk and dairies, flour, cumin and cotton gin, animal feed and silk works are also produced in Torbat.

== Universities and higher education centers ==
Torbat Heydariyeh in recent years as a university hub in Khorasan Razavi, has good higher education facilities. Torbat Heydariyeh Higher Education Centers are:

Islamic Azad University Torbat Heydarieh

Torbat Heydariyeh University

Torbat Heydariyeh University of Medical Sciences

== Photo gallery ==
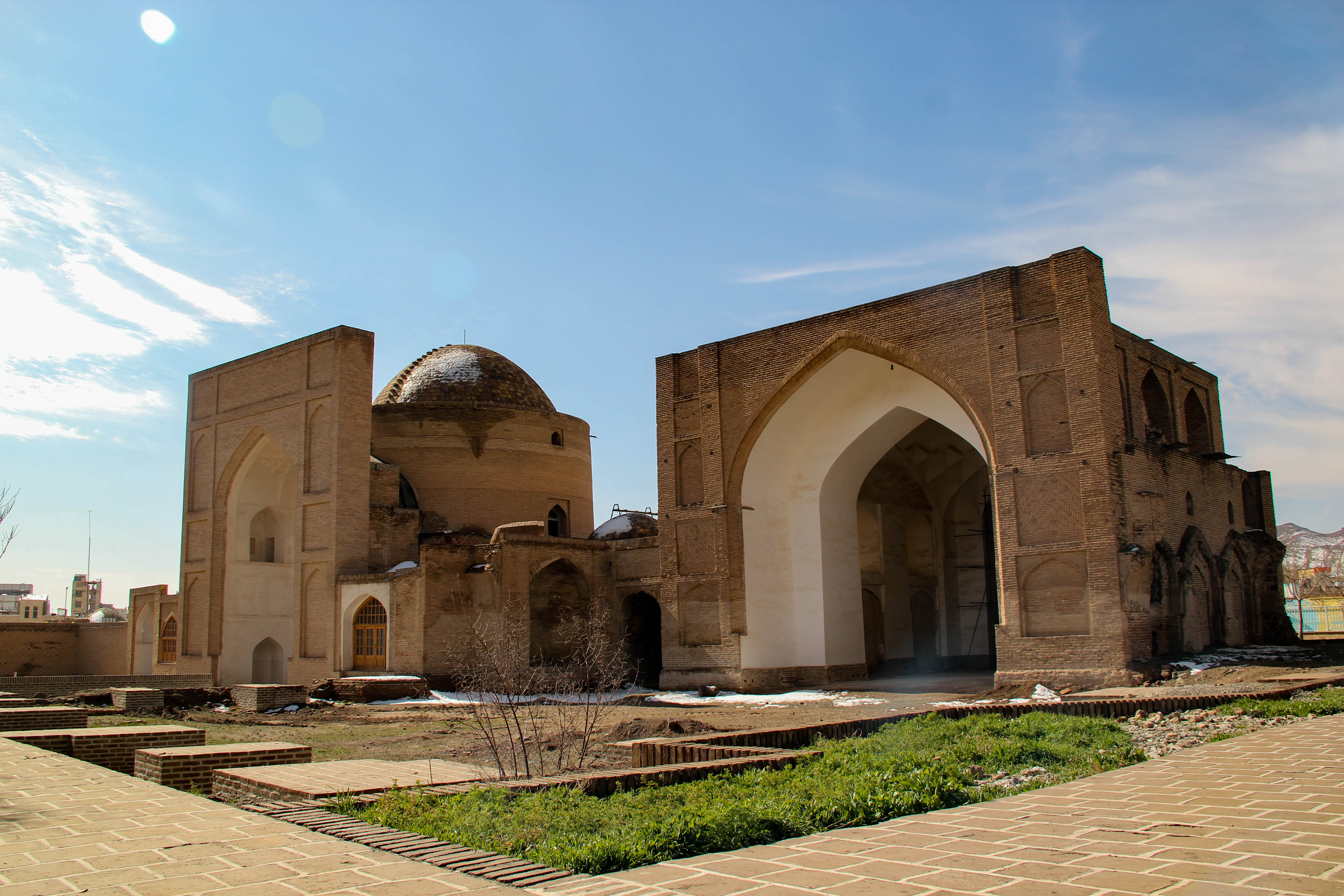
Tomb of Qutb ab-Din Haydar

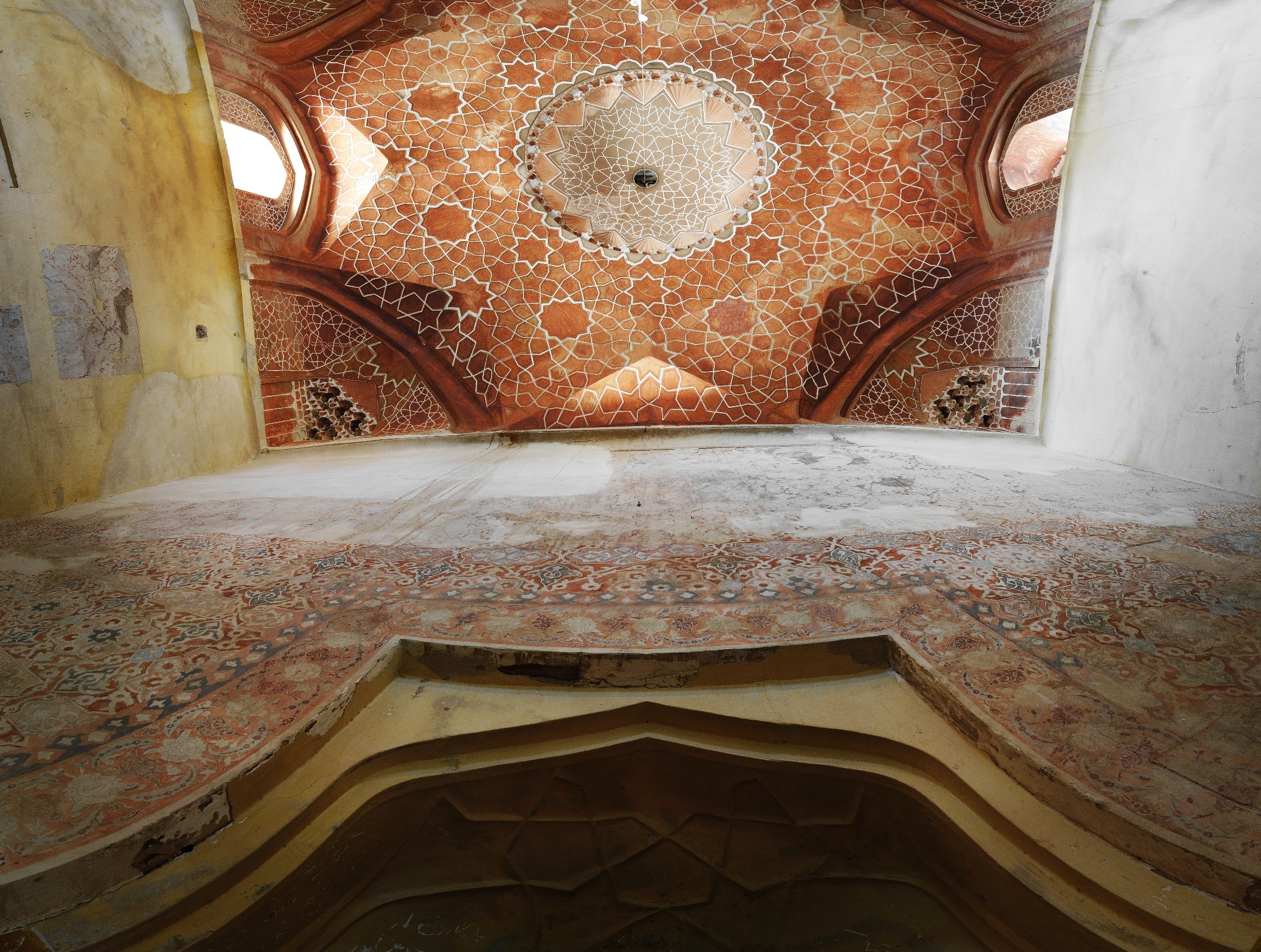
Altar and roof of Ghotboddin Heydar's Tomb - Photo by Jalal Mirzaei

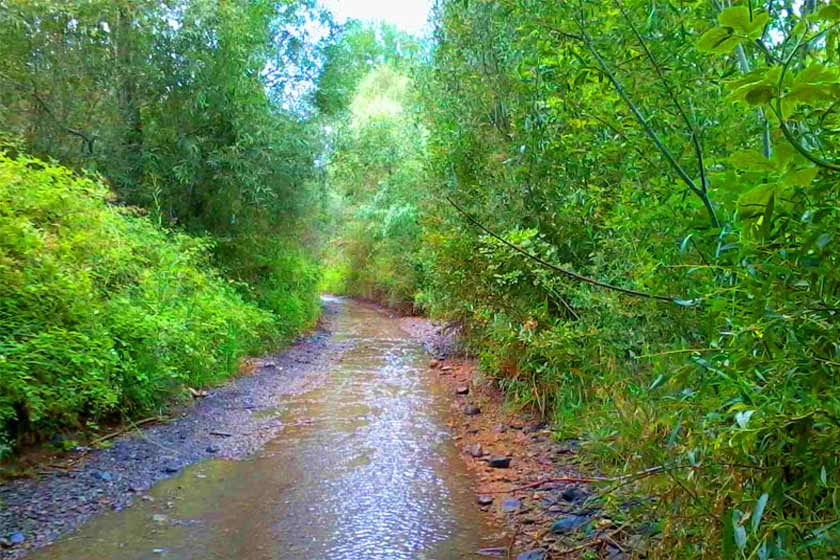
Hesar River in Torbat

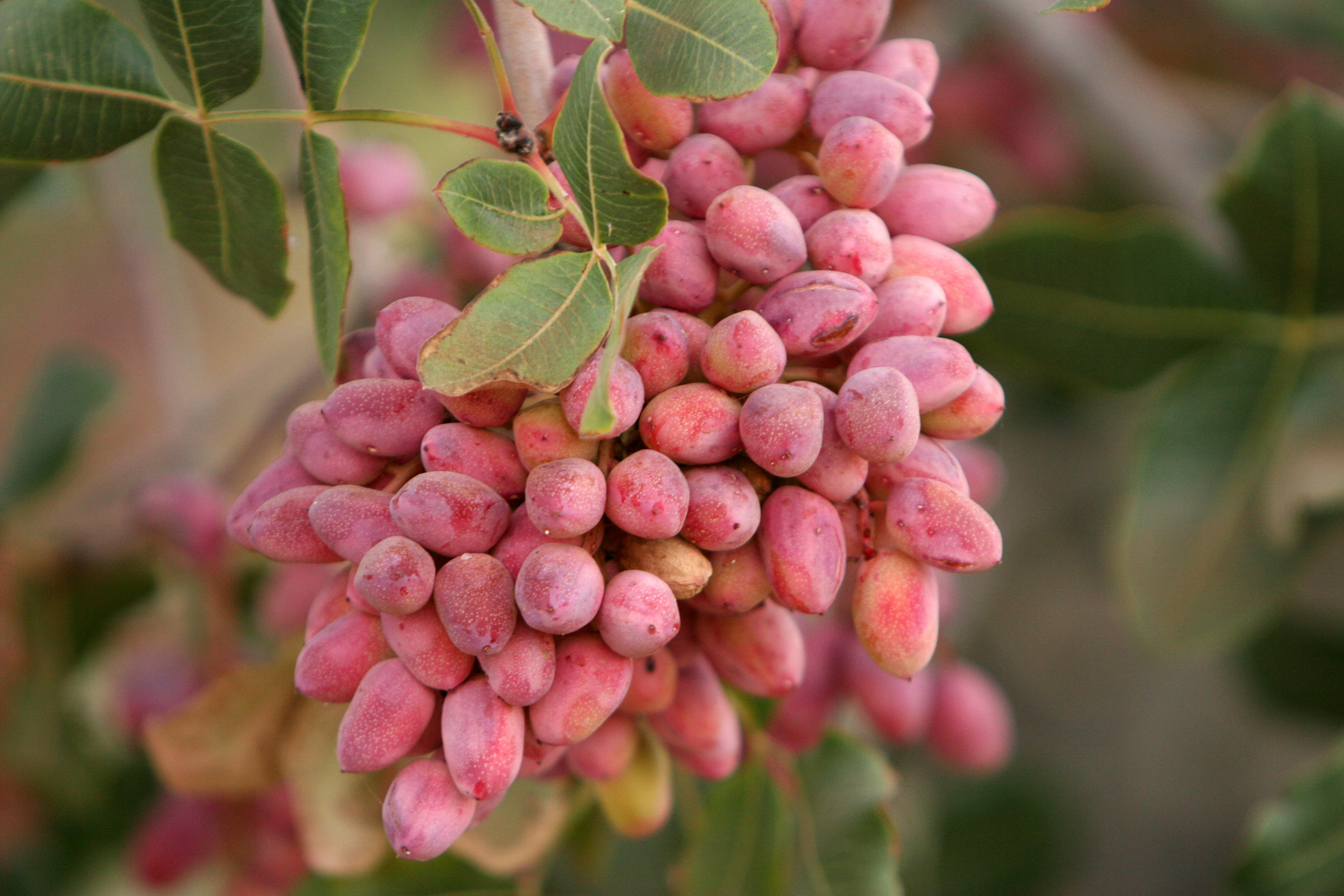
Pistachio farm, Torbat-e Heydarieh, Razavi Khorasan Province, Iran.

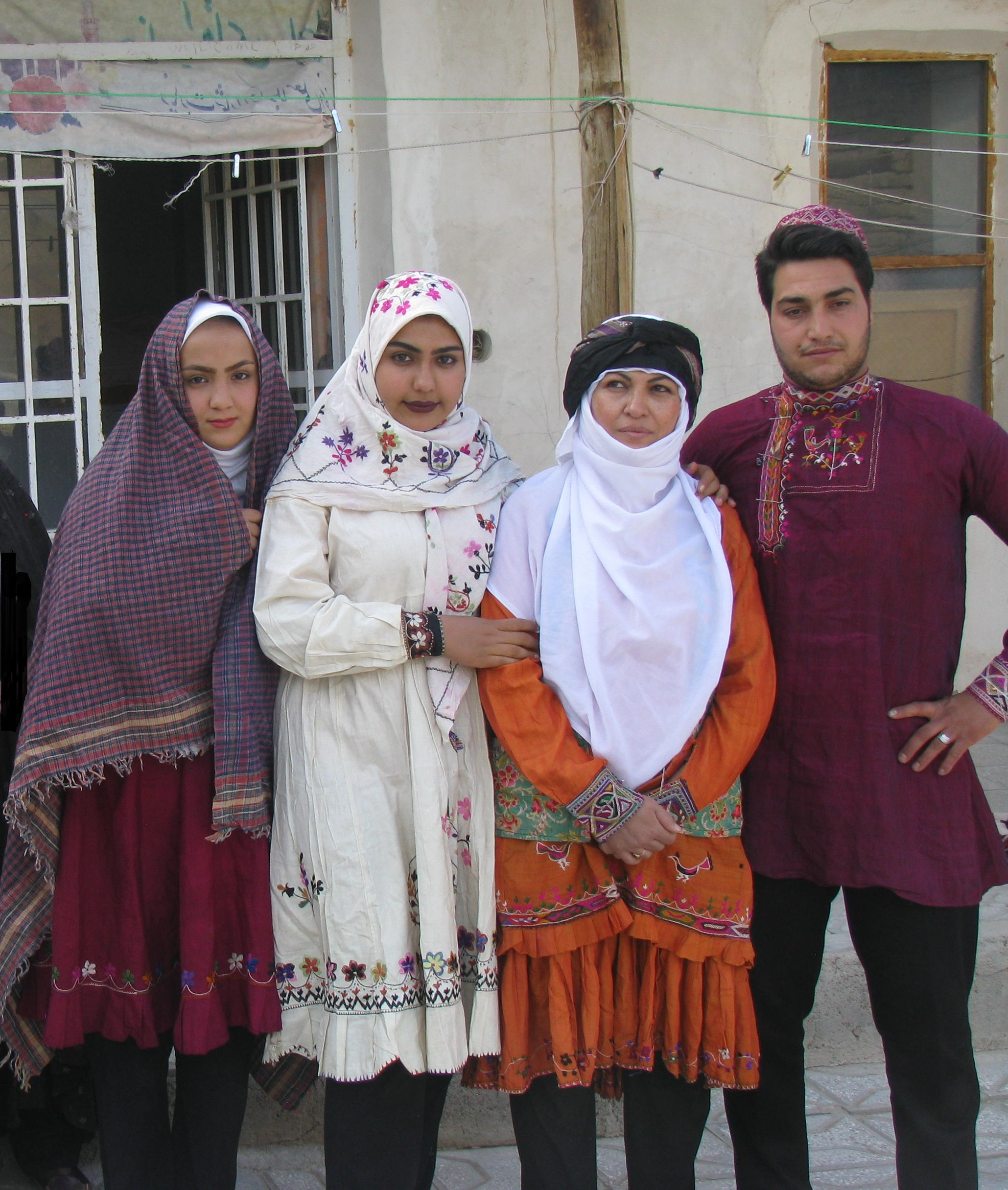
Traditional clothing in Rud Majan of Torbat

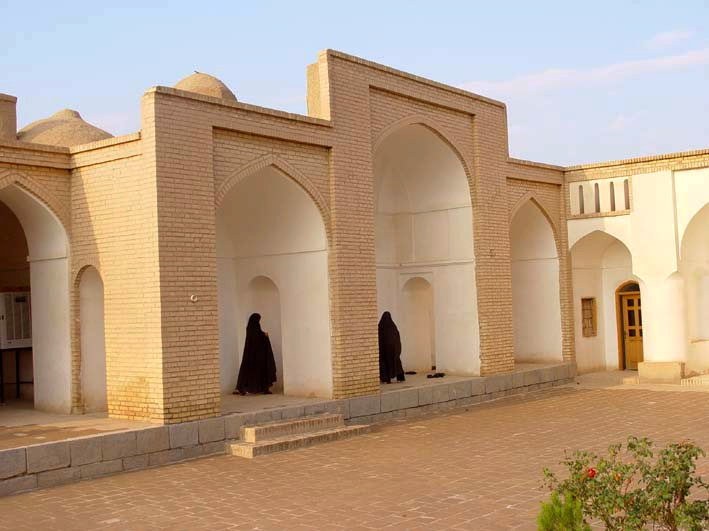
Village of Mahne, Torbat-e Heydarieh County, Mah Welat, Razavi Khorasan Province

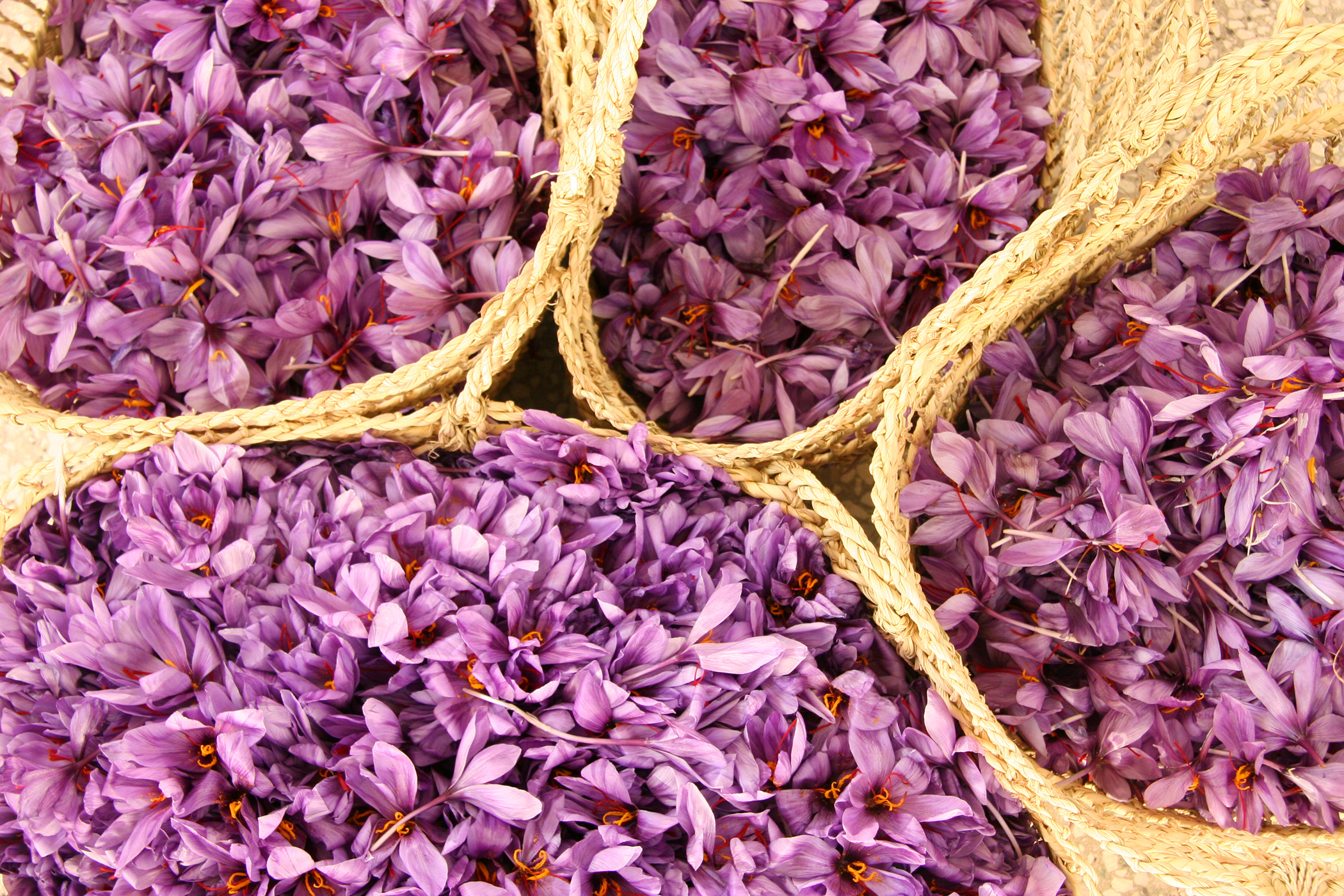
Saffron Farm, Torbat-e-Heydarieh, Razavi Khorasan, Iran

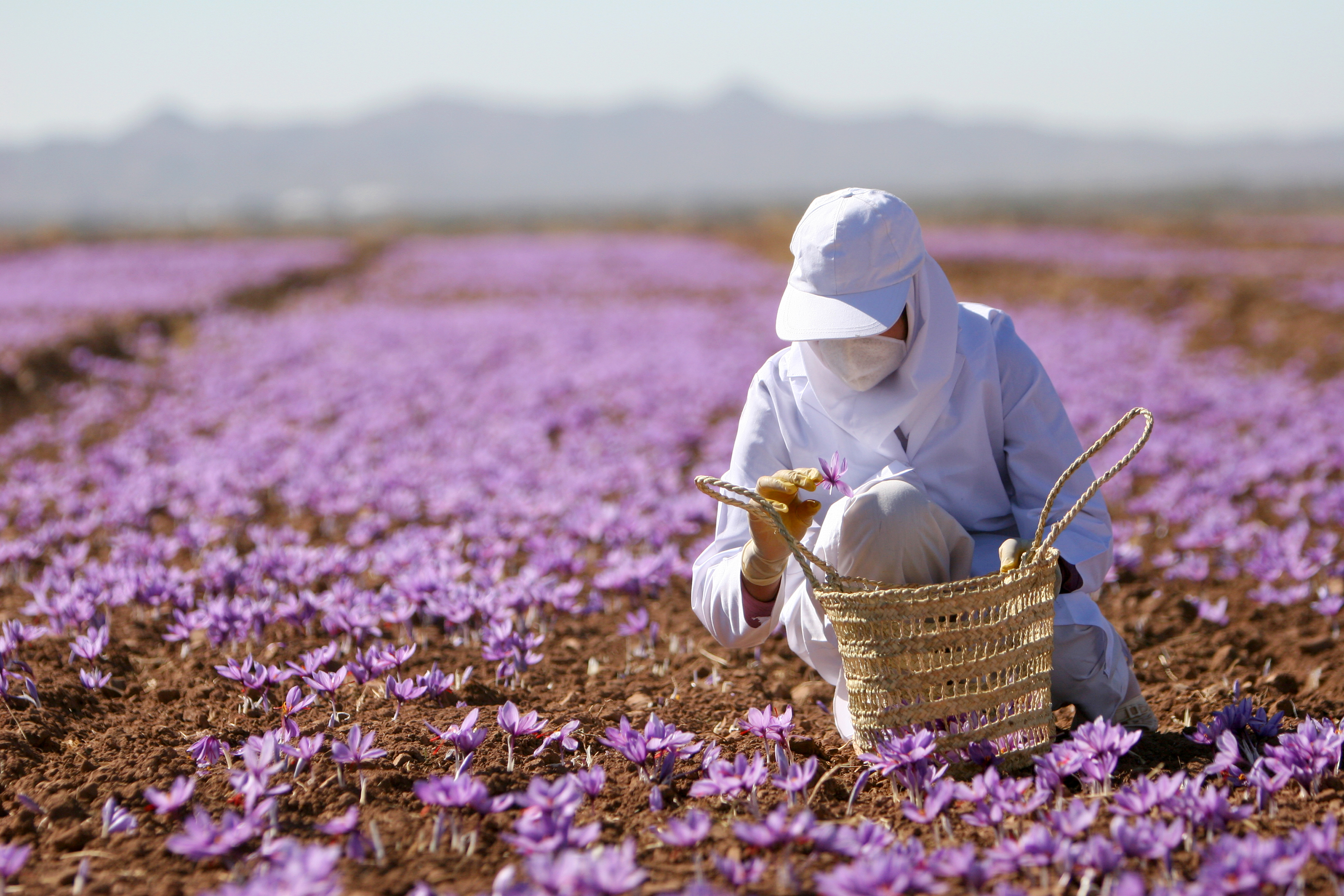
Saffron Farm, Torbat-e-Heydarieh, Razavi Khorasan, Iran

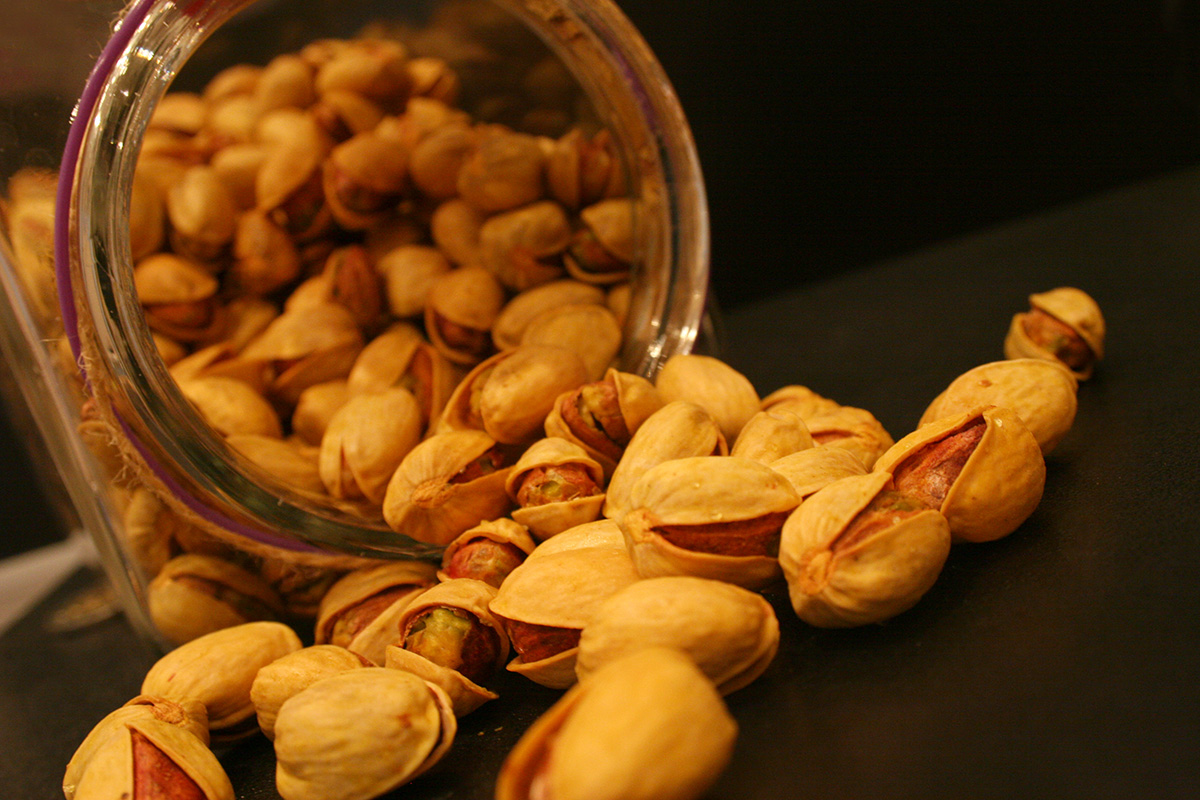
Dried pistachios, Iran

== Notable people ==
- Eshaq Khan Qaraei-Torbati, died in 1816; chief of the Qarai tribe and founder of Torbat-e Heydarieh city in the late Afshar period
- Mahmoud Shehabi Khorassani, born 1903 in Torbat-e Heydarieh, died in 1986 in Mulhouse, France; a lawyer, a high-ranking philosopher and one of the most famous and eminent jurists of the Pahlavi era. He was a distinguished and emeritus professor at the University of Tehran
- Mohammad Qahraman, born 1929 in Torbat-e Heydarieh, died in 2013 in Mashhad; a poet
- Saeed Soheili, born 1959 in Torbat-e Heydarieh; an Iranian director and script writer
- Reza Rafi, born August 1968 in Torbat-e Heydarieh; an Iranian writer, satirist, journalist, and showman
- Setareh Eskandari, born 15 June 1974 in Torbat-e Heydarieh; an Iranian actress
- Laleh Eskandari, born 1975 in Torbat-e Heydarieh; an Iranian actress
- Hassan Taftian, born 1993 in Torbat-e Heydarieh; an athlete

== Sources ==
- Tarikh-e Torbat-e Heydarieh: ba tekiye be naqshe Ishaq Khan Qaraei, Mohammad Qaneyi
- Chisholm, Hugh, ed. (1911). "Turbet i Haidari" . Encyclopædia Britannica. Vol. 27 (11th ed.). Cambridge University Press.
