= Qutb ad-Dīn Haydar =

13th-century Persian Muslim saint

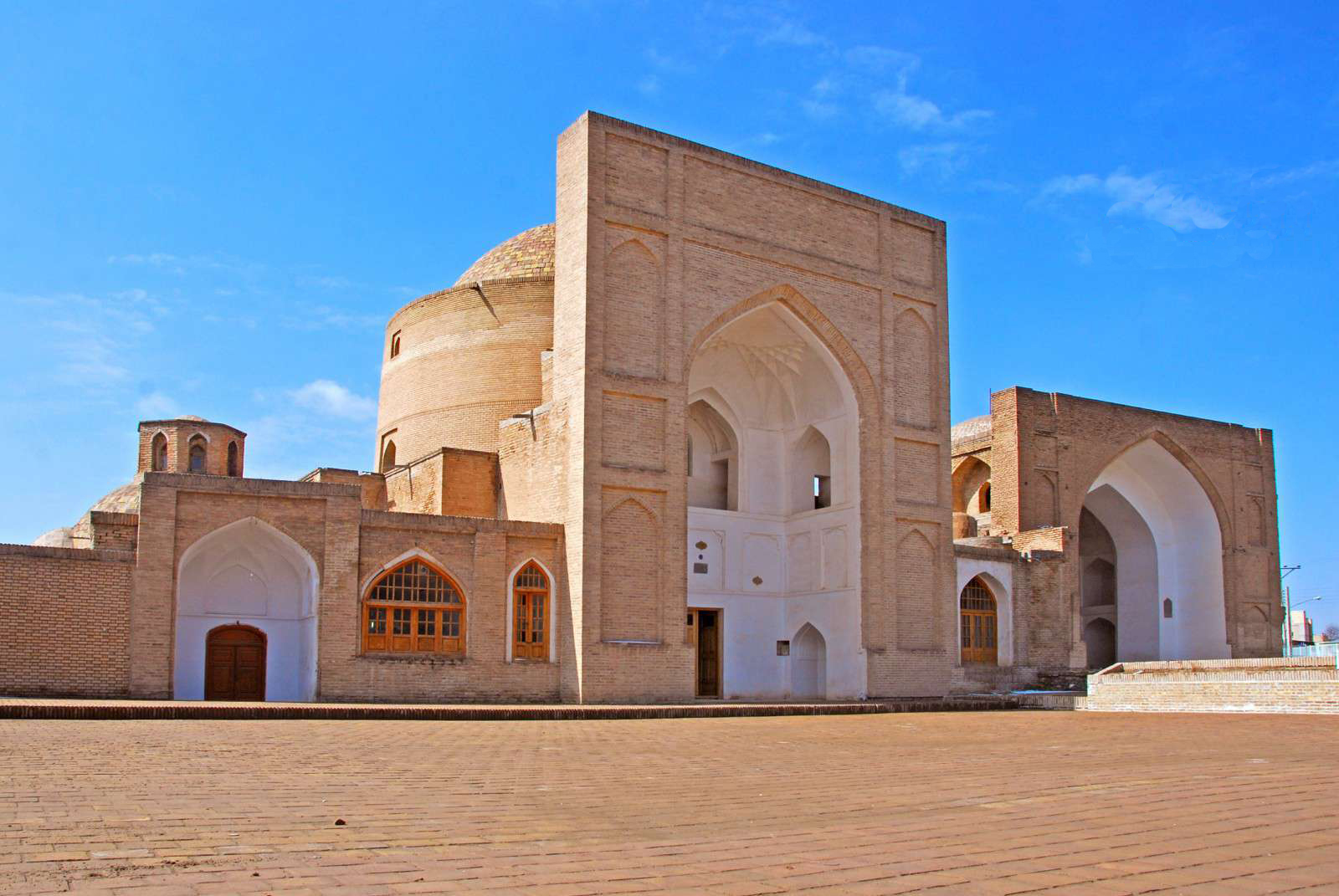
- Qutb ad-Din Haydar Mausoleum
- Title: Qutb ad-Dīn Haydar

Personal life
- Died: 1221 CE (618 Hijri)

Religious life
- Religion: Islam

Muslim leader
- Influenced by: Ahmed Yesevi
- Influenced: Hajji Bektash Wali

Qutb ad-Dīn Haydar was a Persian Sufi saint and Malāmatī-Qalāndārī Sheikh, of possible Turkic origin, and is buried in Zava, Khurasan. Qazvini, author of the Tarikh-i guzida, states Haydar was alive at the time of the Mongol invasion of Central Asia in 1220 and died in 1221 CE/618 AH. The date of his life helpfully indicates the time when the use of cannabis took hold in Islamic society.

Haydar apparently followed an ascetic discipline until he ate some marijuana that he found growing. He then took to eating it constantly. It was deemed compatible with a spiritual life, a positive aid even.

God almighty has granted you as a special favour an awareness of the virtues of this leaf, so that your use of it will dissipate the cares that obscure your souls and free your spirits from everything that might hamper them, keep carefully, then the deposit he has confided in you.

Use of cannabis migrated into Iraq, Syria and Egypt where it was known as 'Haydar's Lady' or 'the Wine of Haydar'.

Haydar – the Persian form of his name is Heydar – founded an order of mendicant dervishes called the Ḥaydariyya who were known for their celibacy and mortification of the flesh through piercing their own bodies with iron rings. His followers also wore felt and walked barefoot. According to al-Jawbari in his book Kashf al-Asrar "Unveiling the Secrets", "members of the Haydariyya dervish order took Hashish before staging their performances of self-mutilation, in order to numb the pain." Al-Jawbari's Kashf al-Asrar was written in 13th century Iraq. The author was a conjuror whose writing was an exposé of not only magic tricks but also the 'dodges' of beggars and other 'low-life'. In fact the term hashishiyya is synonymous with 'low-life' and has been used as such for centuries in the Islamic world.

== See also ==
- Sidi Heddi
