= Qarai (tribe) =

Turkic tribe in Iran

The Qarai, Karai or Qara Tatars (lit. Black Tatars) are a Turkic tribe found in Khorasan, Azerbaijan, Kerman, and Fars.

== Etymology ==
According to Encyclopedia Iranica, the Qara'i or Qara Tatars are "a Turkic-speaking tribe of Azerbaijan, Khorasan, Kermān, and Fārs." According to Vladimir Minorsky, the name Karāʾi may have been rooted in the Keraites, a Turco-Mongol people, while according to Gyula Németh, the tribe's name might have originated from other ethnic groups in Central Asia.

Since qara "black" is a designation for "north" in Turkic languages it was a frequently used tribal identifier among the early Turkic peoples, and there are numerous Kipchak groups known by this adjective. The earliest mention of these, not necessarily related, are the "Black Tatars" (Chinese: 黑韃靼), a subdivision of the Rouran Khaganate in Tang sources. Meanwhile, at the western end of the steppe, more "black Tatars" were troops serving the First Bulgarian Empire.

== History ==
The Qara Tatars were recorded as a Mongol tribe of 30–40,000 nomad families dwelling near Amasya and Kayseri in Anatolia at the time of Timur's conquests. Upon a suggestion by the Ottoman Sultan Bayezid I and to refill the depopulated extremities of his empire, Timur deported these tribes back to Central Asia, specifically Khwarazm and an island in Issyk-Kul that later ceased to exist. Many of the tribesmen tried to escape from the forced migration, and although many were captured, some tribesmen remained in Anatolia. A portion of the tribe that was previously deported managed to escape to the Golden Horde, and some additionally returned to Anatolia following Timur's demise. In 1419, groups from the tribe were deported by the Ottomans to the Balkans, settling near Pazardzhik in modern-day Bulgaria.

At the start of the Qajar dynasty, Qarai Turks were also scattered beyond southern Khorasan through the desert zone of Sistan. Malcolm (1829) thought the Qarai of Persia arrived from "Tartary" as a result of Timur's campaigns. Under Afsharid Nader Shah (r. 1736–1747), they were settled in Khorasan. Before that time, the Karai seem also to have been found in Azerbaijan. Adam Olearius, who traveled in Azerbaijan in 1638, mentions Karai as one of the tribes of Mogan.

They became influential there in the 18th century, after their leader, Amir Khan, was made governor of Mashhad under Ahmad Shah Durrani in 1749. Their political power peaked in the early 19th century under the leadership of Eshaq Khan Qaraei-Torbati. Eshaq Khan had submitted to Agha Mohammad Khan Qajar in 1795, but under Fath-Ali Shah Qajar he achieved de facto autonomy from the central Qajar government, seizing control of Mashad in 1813. But soon later, in 1816, Eshaq Khan's tribal alliance fell apart and he was killed in Mashad.

Esḥaq Khan was succeeded by his son Mohammad Khan Qaraei-Torbati, who managed to retain "a sort of semi-independent existence" But in the second half of the 19th century, the Karai chiefs lost most of their wealth and influence. George N. Curzon, who visited the area in 1889, described the region as "terribly decimated both by Turkmen ravages and by the great famine".

== Demographics ==
A small Qarai population is found in Kerman province, comprising some 420 households as of 1957, centered on the village of Tangu. and in Fars province, where clans using the name Qarai are found within the Qashqai, Khamsa and Mamasāni tribal confederacies. Oberling (1960:101) cites Iranian Army Files of 1956 according to which the Qarai of Kerman and Fars were moved there from Khorasan during the Safavid dynasty.

== See also ==
- Ethnicities in Iran
- Khorasani Turks
- Qizilbash
- Keraites

== Bibliography ==
- Barthold, Wilhelm (1936). "Tatar". E.J. Brill's First Encyclopaedia of Islam. Brill. ISBN 978-90-04-09794-0.
- Oberling, Pierre (2002). "Karāʾi". Encyclopædia Iranica. Vol. XV, Fasc. 5. pp. 536–537.
- P. Oberling, The Turkic Peoples of Southern Iran, Cleveland, 1960.
- Sümer, Faruk. İlhanlı Hükümdarları (in Turkish).
