= Ali Muhammad Khan Khudakka =

Durrani prince, author, historian (1779-1840)

- Shahzada of the Durrani Empire; Aali Jah
- Born: Multan, Durrani Empire
- Died: 1840 (aged 60–61)
- Issue: Shahzada Hajji Muhammad Bahram Khan; Shahzada Muhammad Zargham Khan; Shahzada Mubazar-ud-din Khan; Shahzada Azdar Ali Khan
Names
- Aali Jah Shahzada Ali Muhammad Khan Khudakka Sadozai
- Dynasty: Durrani dynasty
- Father: Shahzada Din Muhammad Khan
- Religion: Sunni Islam

Ali Muhammad Khan Khudakka Sadozai (born 1779 – died 1840) was a prince of the later Durrani Empire. He was born in Multan and was from the Khudakka (Multan) branch of the Durrani imperial family, being the closest of kin to Zaman Shah and Shuja Shah Durrani, the latter of whom he served as a close aide. He was designated with the style Aali Jah ('His Exalted Highness') by Shuja Shah Durrani. His other honorific prefix was Shahzada or Shahzadeh, as a prince. He was a cultivated and well-educated man who was highly involved in the politics and foreign affairs of his time.

== Early life and Background ==
Shahzada Ali Muhammad Khan was born in Multan to Shahzada Din Muhammad Khan, the former Governor of Multan under Timur Shah Durrani. His father and grandfather were the closest of kin to the Durrani Emperors, being members of the Khizr Khēl (Durrani imperial family) branch of the Sadōzai tribe. The family held an influential position in Multan.

Shahzada Ali had four sons: Shahzada Hajji Muhammad Bahram Khan, Shahzada Muhammad Zargham Khan, Shahzada Mubazar-ud-din Khan, and Shahzada Azdar Ali Khan. Their descendants form the modern Khudakka family. The four brothers collectively commissioned the construction of the Khudakka Mosque in Multan, which was completed in 1870.

== Scholarship ==
A renowned scholar as well, he authored Taẕkirat al-mulūk-i ʿālī-shān az awlād-i Sadō mīr-i Afghān (Biography of sublime sovereigns among the progeny of Sadō, chief of the Afghans), a comprehensive and well-regarded history of both the Pashtun people and the Sadōzai, with particular attention to its various branches, including his own. It consists of 483 folios handwritten in Persian with four complete copies within the Khudakka family, and one incomplete manuscript, residing in the Raverty collection of the British Library. He completed the work in 1835, a few years before his death. Taẕkirat al-mulūk-i ʿālī-shān, to use the shortened name of the text, was later consulted by the Amir of Afghanistan, Amir Abdur Rahman Khan in his conversation with the Viceroy of British India, Lord Curzon over the history of Pashtuns.

The Taẕkirat al-mulūk-i ʿālī-shān is considered as a significant primary source on Durrani history. Its structure consists of an introduction (muqaaddima), two focuses (aṣl) with sub-branches (farʿ), and a khātima (conclusion).

== Politics ==
As a courtier and close aide of Shuja Shah Durrani, Shahzada Ali served as ambassador to Maharaja Ranjit Singh of the Sikh Empire. He assisted in efforts to end the de facto independence of the Durrani province of Multan from Kabul.

In addition to his diplomatic duties, Shahzada Ali was responsible for drafting official documents on behalf of the Durrani emperor. His name appears frequently in the Sikh court chronicle ʿUmdat al-tawārīkh.

== Succession & Descendants ==
Shahzada Ali Muhammad Khan passed away in 1840 and was succeeded by his eldest son, Shahzada Hajji Muhammad Bahram Khan, who became Tehsildar of Multan. Shahzada Ali’s grandson, Shahzada Nur Muhammad Khan (also the son-in-law to Shahzada Bahram) was formally recognized by the British Indian Empire as the Chief of the dynasty. He was appointed a Viceregal Darbari and inducted into the Empire’s landed gentry; both the Darbari seat and the associated estates were established as hereditary honors, descending alongside the Shahzada title to his heirs.

Shahzada Nur Muhammad Khan's eldest granddaughter, Shahzadi Zeb-un-nisa, married Pir Syed Sardar Ali Shah Bukhari, an influential pir and jagirdar from Multan. They had three sons, and their descendants constitute the modern Mithan Bukhari clan.

Shahzada Muhammad Zargham Khan’s descendants currently manage the Khudakka properties in Multan. Members of this line, including Dr. Ashiq Muhammad Khan Durrani and Umar Kamal Khan, have made scholarly contributions in the field of Pashtun history.
