= Durrani Empire =

Afghan state from 1747-1823 and 1839-1843

Durrani Empire Durrani Kingdom د درانيانو ټولواکمني (Pashto) امپراتوری درانی‌ها (Persian)
- 1747–1823; 1839–1843 (Empire); 1793–1863 (Herat)
- Flags (Note: The flag on the top was used from 1747–1801, 1803–1809, and 1839–1842. The flag on the bottom was used during Humayun Shah's rebellion from 1793–1796, (Note: Kuhzad, 1950.) and officially from 1801–1803 and 1809–1818, with its use continuing in Herat. From 1818–1823, the former flag continued to be used, but without the emblem.) Seals of Ahmad Shah Durrani
- Status: 1747–1823; 1839–1843 (Empire); 1793–1863 (Herat)
- Capital: Kandahar (1747–1776); Kabul (1776–1823) (Note: Summer capital); Peshawar (1776–1823) (Note: Winter capital); Herat (1793–1863)
- Official languages: Pashto (1747–1776) (Note: Dynastic, buraucratic, poetry); Persian (1776–1823) (Note: Chancery, chief court language, historiographical works, diplomacy)
- Religion: Sunni Islam (official)
- Government: Confederal elective monarchy
- Shah
  - 1747–1772 (first): Ahmad Shah Durrani
  - 1842–1843 (last): Shahpur Shah Durrani (Empire)
  - 1863 (last): Shah Nawaz Khan (Herat)
- Historical era: Early modern period
  - Empire established by Ahmad Shah Durrani: 23 July 1747
  - Civil War: 20 May 1793
  - Fall of Kabul: March 1823
  - Restoration: 7 August 1839
  - Restoration Collapse: April 1843
  - Fall of Herat: 9 June 1863

Area
  - Total: 2,000,000 km^{2} (770,000 sq mi)

Population
- 14 million
Preceded by
Afsharid Iran
Mughal Empire
Maratha Empire
Bukhara Khanate
Succeeded by
Principality of Kabul
Kingdom of Herat
Principality of Kandahar
Maimana Khanate
Sikh Empire
- Today part of: Afghanistan; Pakistan; Iran; India; Turkmenistan; Tajikistan

The Durrani Empire, (Note: Pashto: د درانيانو ټولواکمني, romanized: Də Durrānyāno Ṭolwākmani, pronounced [d̪ə d̪u(ɾ).ɾɑn.jɑ.no ʈol.wɑk.ma.ni]; Persian: امپراتوری درانی‌ها, romanized: Imparātūrī-yi Durrānīhā, pronounced [ʔɪm.pʰä.ɾɑː.t̪ʰuː.ɾíː‿jɪ d̪uɾ.ɾɑː.níː‿ɦɑː]) colloquially known as the Kingdom of Afghanistan, the Afghan Empire, or the Sadozai Kingdom, was an Afghan empire founded in 1747 by Ahmad Shah Durrani, of the Pashtun Durrani tribe. The empire spanned parts of Central Asia, the Iranian plateau, and the Indian subcontinent. At its peak, it ruled over present-day Afghanistan, much of Pakistan, parts of northeastern and southeastern Iran, eastern Turkmenistan, and northwestern India. Alongside the Ottoman Empire, the Durrani Empire is considered one of the most significant Islamic empires of the second half of the 18th century.

Ahmad was the son of Muhammad Zaman Khan, chief of the Abdali tribe, and the commander of Nader Shah Afshar. Following Afshar's death in June 1747, Ahmad secured western and central Afghanistan by taking Kandahar and Ghazni. After his accession as the nation's king, he changed his tribal name from Abdali to Durrani. In 1749, the Maratha Empire controlled eastern Afghanistan after driving out the Mughals; Ahmad then set out westward to take possession of Mashhad, which was ruled by the Afsharid dynasty under Shahrokh Shah, who also acknowledged Afghan suzerainty. Subsequently, Ahmad sent an army to subdue the areas north of the Hindu Kush down to the Amu Darya, and in short order, all of the different Afghan tribes began to join his cause. Under Ahmad, the Afghans invaded India on eight occasions, subjugating parts of Kashmir and the majority of Punjab. In early 1757, Ahmad Shah sacked Delhi, but permitted Mughal emperor Alamgir II to remain in nominal control as long as he acknowledged Afghan suzerainty over the regions south of the Indus River, up to the Sutlej River.

Following Ahmad's death in 1772, his son Timur Shah Durrani became the next ruler of the Durrani dynasty. Under Timur, Kabul became the new capital of the Durrani Empire, while Peshawar served as its winter capital. However, the empire had begun to crumble by this time, and lost Peshawar, Multan, and Kashmir to the Sikh Empire in the early 19th century. The dynasty continued in Afghanistan for generations, up until Dost Muhammad Khan and the Barakzai dynasty deposed it in Kabul, leading to its supersession by the Emirate of Afghanistan. The Durrani Empire is considered the foundational polity of the modern nation-state of Afghanistan, with Ahmad being credited as its Father of the Nation.

== History ==
=== Reign of Ahmad Shah Durrani (1747–1772) ===
==== Foundation of the Afghan state ====
In 1709, Mirwais Hotak, chief of the Ghilji tribe of Loy Kandahar, gained independence from the Safavid Persians. From 1722 to 1725, his son Mahmud Hotak briefly ruled large parts of Iran and declared himself as Shah of Persia. However, the Hotak dynasty came to a complete end in 1738 after being toppled and banished by the Afsharids who were led by Nader Shah Afshar of Persia.

The year 1747 marks the definitive appearance of an Afghan political entity independent of both the Persian and Mughal empires. In June of that year a loya jirga (grand council) was called into session. The jirga lasted for nine days and two chief contestants emerged: Hajji Jamal Khan of the Mohammadzai lineage and Ahmad Khan of the Sadozai. Mohammad Sabir Khan, a noted darwish (holy man), who had earlier predicted that Ahmad Khan would be the leader of the Afghans, rose in the jirga and said

Why all this verbose talk? God has created Ahmad Khan a much greater man than any of you; his life is the most noble of all the Afghan families. Maintain, therefore, God's work, for His wrath will weigh heavily upon you if you destroy it.

Ahmad Khan reputedly hesitated to accept the open decision of the jirga, so Sabir Khan again intervened. He placed some wheat or barley sheaves in Ahmad Khan's turban, and crowned him Pādshah, Durr-i-Durrān (Shah, Pearl of the Pearls). The jirga concluded near the city of Kandahar with Ahmad Shah Durrani being selected as the new leader of the Afghans, thus the Durrani dynasty was founded. Despite being younger than the other contenders, Ahmad Shah had several overriding factors in his favor. He belonged to a respectable family of political background, in particular, his father had served as Governor of Herat and had died in a battle defending the Afghans.

==== Early victories ====
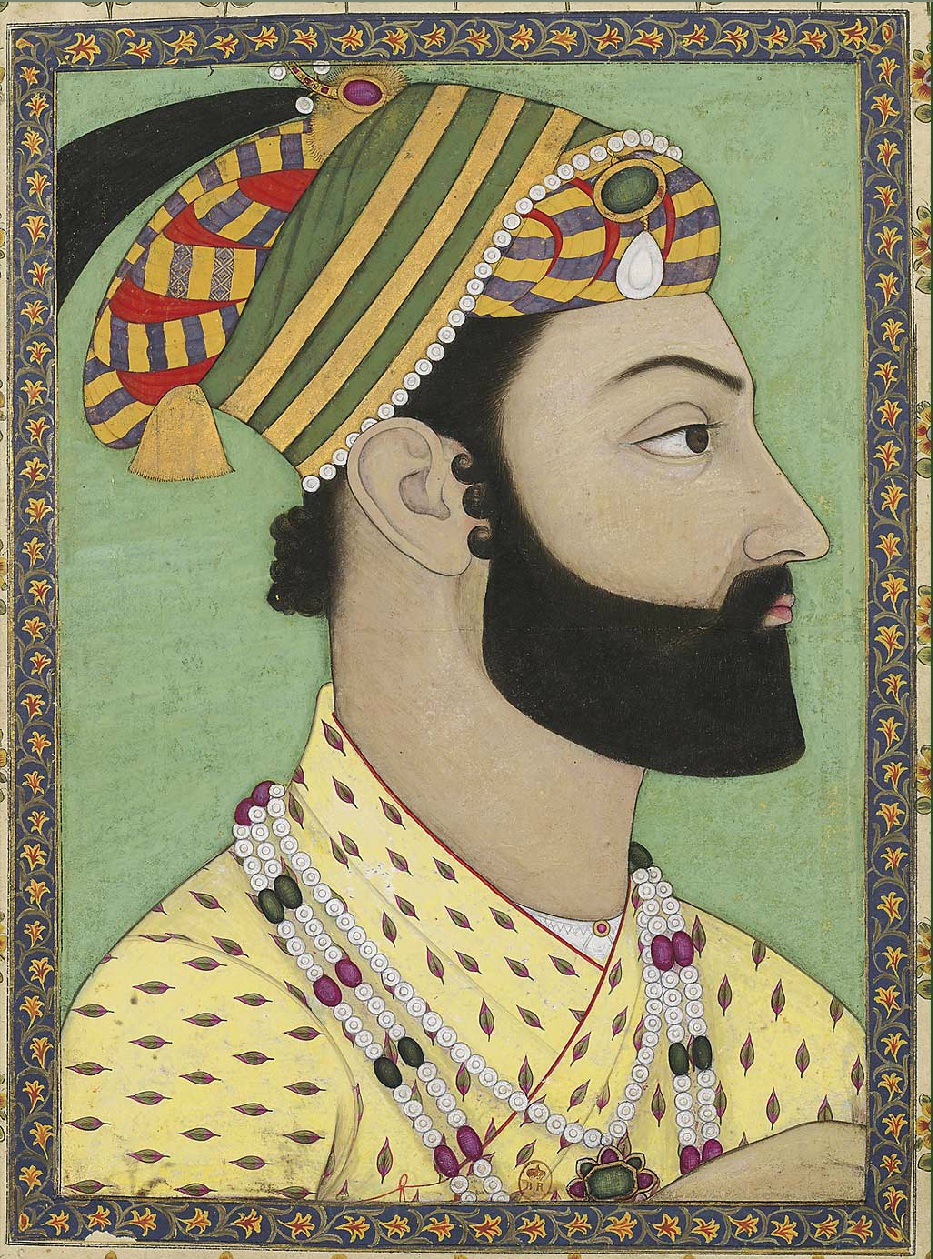
Portrait of Ahmad Shah Durrani, c. 1757

One of Ahmad Shah's first military actions was to capture Qalati Ghilji and Ghazni from the Ghilji, and wrest Kabul and Peshawar from Mughal-appointed governor Nasir Khan. In 1749, the Mughal Emperor Ahmad Shah Bahadur was induced to cede Sindh, the Punjab and the important trans-Indus River to Ahmad Shah Durrani in order to save his capital from Afghan attack. Having thus gained substantial territories to the east without a fight, Ahmad Shah turned westward to take possession of Mashhad, which was ruled by Nader Shah Afshar's grandson, Shahrukh Afshar. Ahmad Shah next sent an army to subdue the areas north of the Hindu Kush mountains. In short order, the powerful army brought under its control the Tajik, Hazara, Uzbek, Turkmen, and other tribes of northern Afghanistan. Ahmad Shah invaded the remnants of the Mughal Empire a third time, and then a fourth, consolidating control over the Kashmir and Punjab regions, with Lahore being governed by Afghans. He sacked Delhi in 1757 but permitted the Mughal dynasty to remain in nominal control of the city as long as the ruler acknowledged Ahmad Shah's suzerainty over Punjab, Sindh, and Kashmir. Leaving his second son Timur Shah to safeguard his interests, Ahmad Shah left India to return to Afghanistan.

==== Relations with China ====
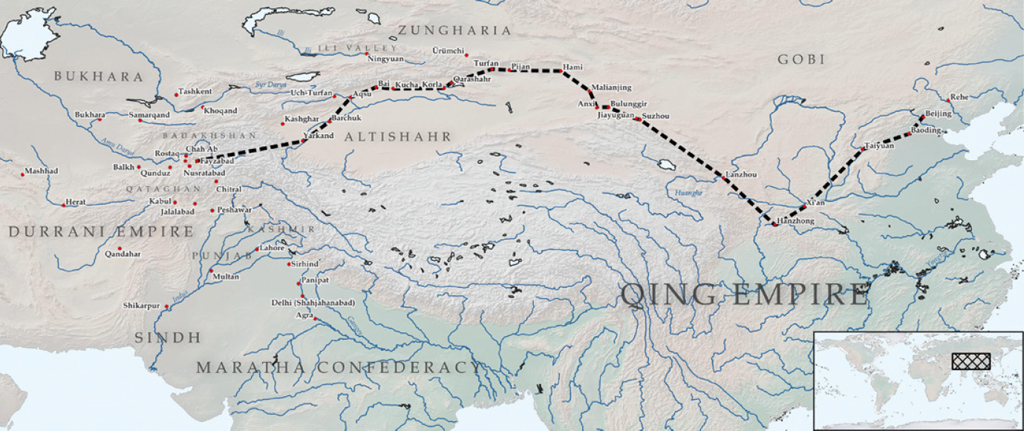
Map of the route the Afghan embassy undertook to the Qing dynasty in 1763

Fazil Biy, the ruler of Kokand, and other Kyrgyz chieftains pleaded to Ahmad Shah to aid them against Qing expansionism. Ahmad Shah, delighted to use a casus belli in the name of Islam, accepted, and occupied the regions between Tashkent and Kokand in 1763, though later withdrawing by 1764 as any alliance failed to be forged.

In 1763, Ahmad Shah had dispatched an embassy to the Qing. His aims in this are unknown, however, an embassy allowed Ahmad Shah to establish himself as an emperor. The letter he sent to the Qing emperor Qianlong is missing, but from the Qing reply, the letter was likely dedicated to his conquests and victory at Panipat, alongside Qing expansion.

The letter positioned Ahmad Shah's expansions as bringing order and stability to areas overrun with rebels and lawlessness (in reference to his campaigns in Iran and India). The battle of Panipat was strongly detailed in the letter, in what was likely a fath-nama, meaning a victory letter or declaration to celebrate a victory. The Qing emperor ignored the effective threat.

In the second part of the letter, Qianlong appeared much more defensive, justifying the Qing conquest of the Dzungars and the Altishahr Khojas. He accused them of causing devastation and laying false accusations against him. A report also suggested that Ahmad Shah considered the territories the Qing claimed belonged to the Muslims. In reality, Ahmad Shah possibly wanted to establish spheres of influence, which was similarly done with the Ottomans which divided Iran between them, and a treaty with Bukhara that had established the Amu Darya as the border.

Why has your Khan dispatched you? Has your Khan not sent you to appear at an audience with the brilliance of our Great Lord? Our Great Lord is the ruler who has united All under Heaven. Besides you Afghans, as soon as people from the West, Russia, even the former Zunghars came, all of them promptly prostrated themselves before the Great Lord. He is like Heaven; do you not bow before Heaven?

— A Qing grand councillor, remarking at the Afghan envoy's refusal to Kowtow

When the Afghan embassy had arrived in Beijing, the chief envoy, Khwaja Mirhan, had refused to kowtow before the Qing emperor. The Qing officials, in shock, demanded he kowtow, to which Mirhan eventually acquiesced. This incident damaged the Qing-Afghan relations and Qianlong cut ties with the Afghans following this. No immediate consequence occurred, and the envoy was shown favor.

Mirhan's refusal likely came out of religious reasons, but the Qing received it as Ahmad Shah declaring himself equal to Qianlong. From Qianlong's view, he saw the Afghans as a significant power and attempted to impress the envoy and in contrast, Ahmad Shah, of the Qing empire. This was especially done in motivation of Altishahr's recent conquest and concerns over stability in the region.

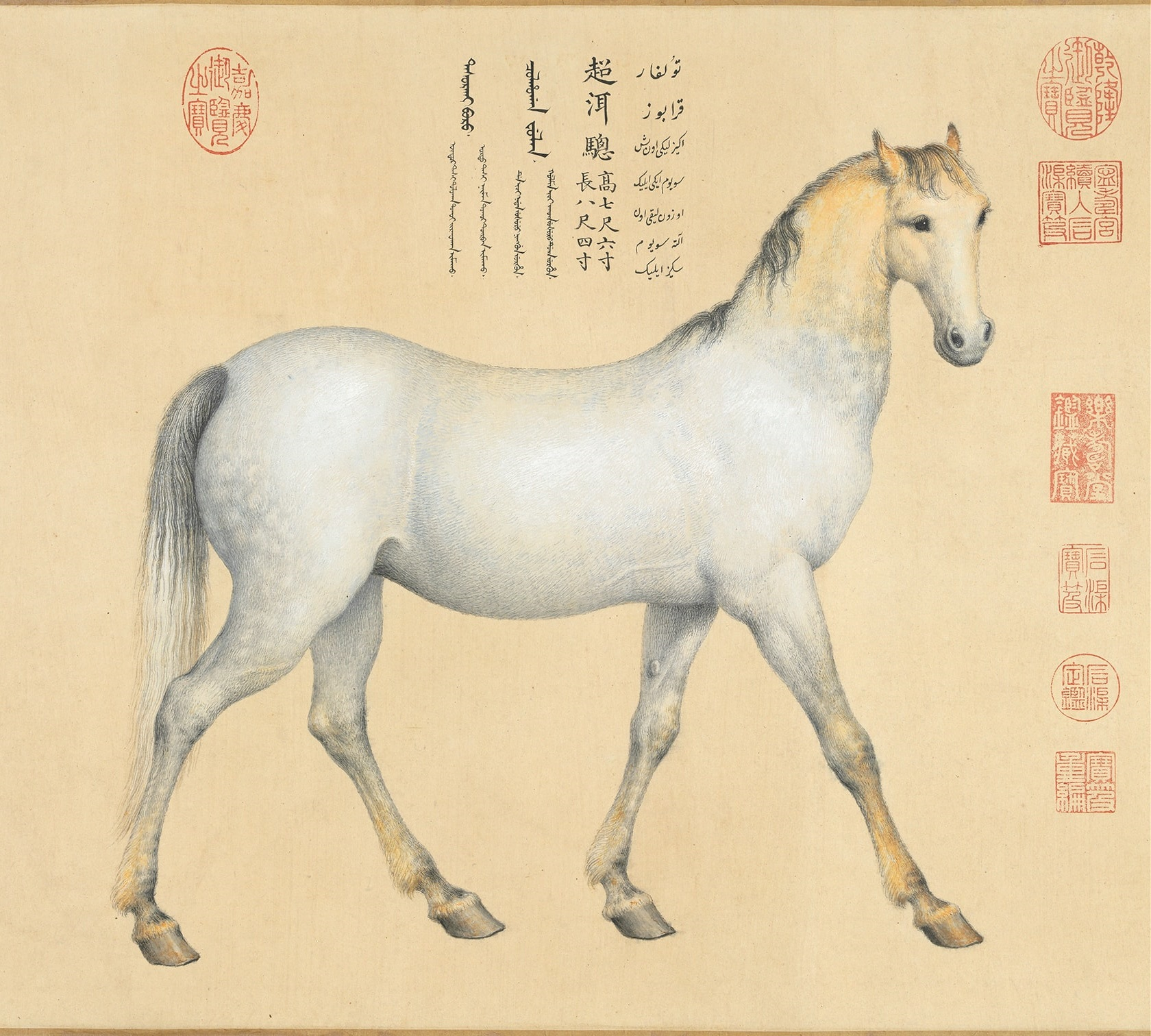
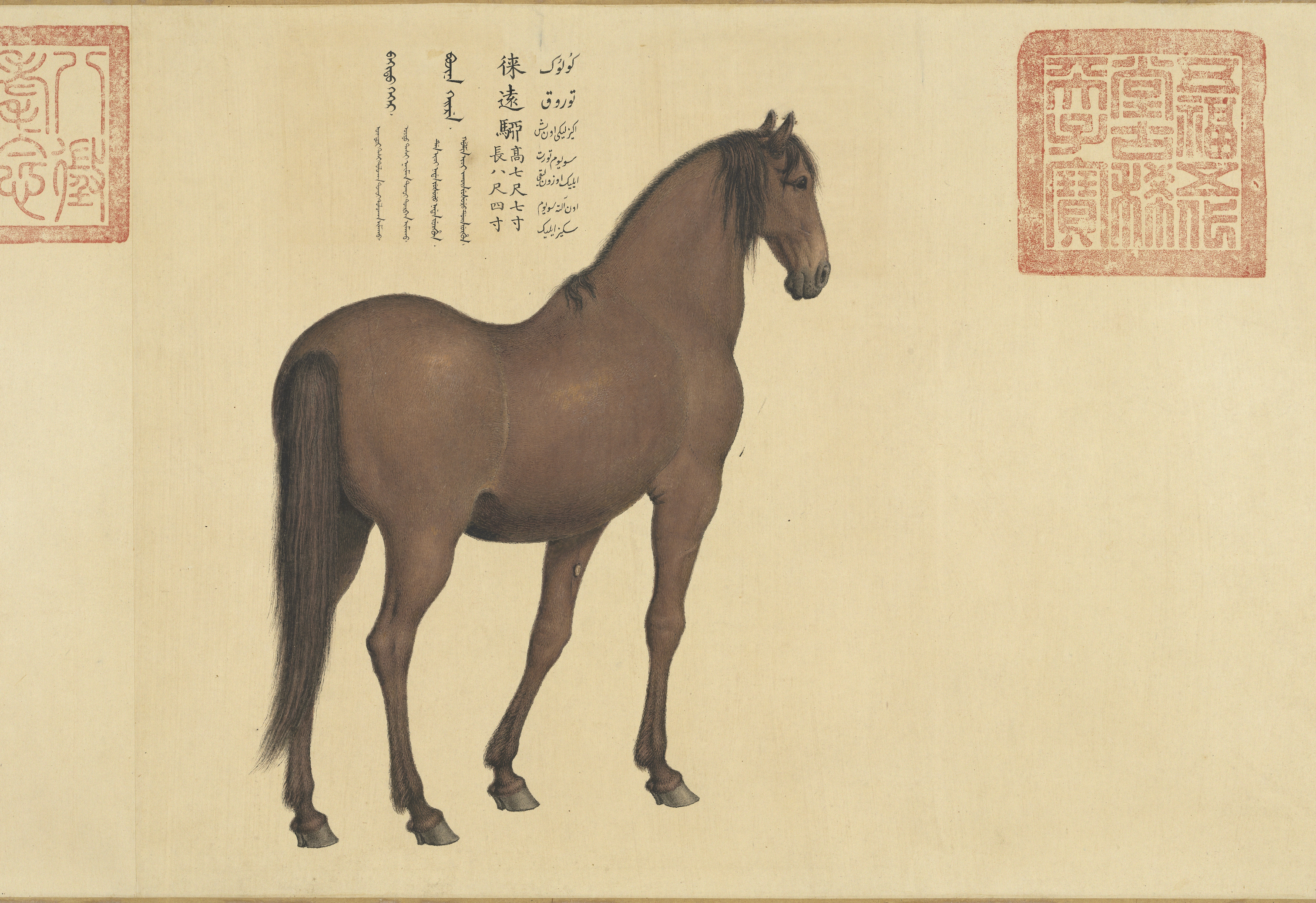
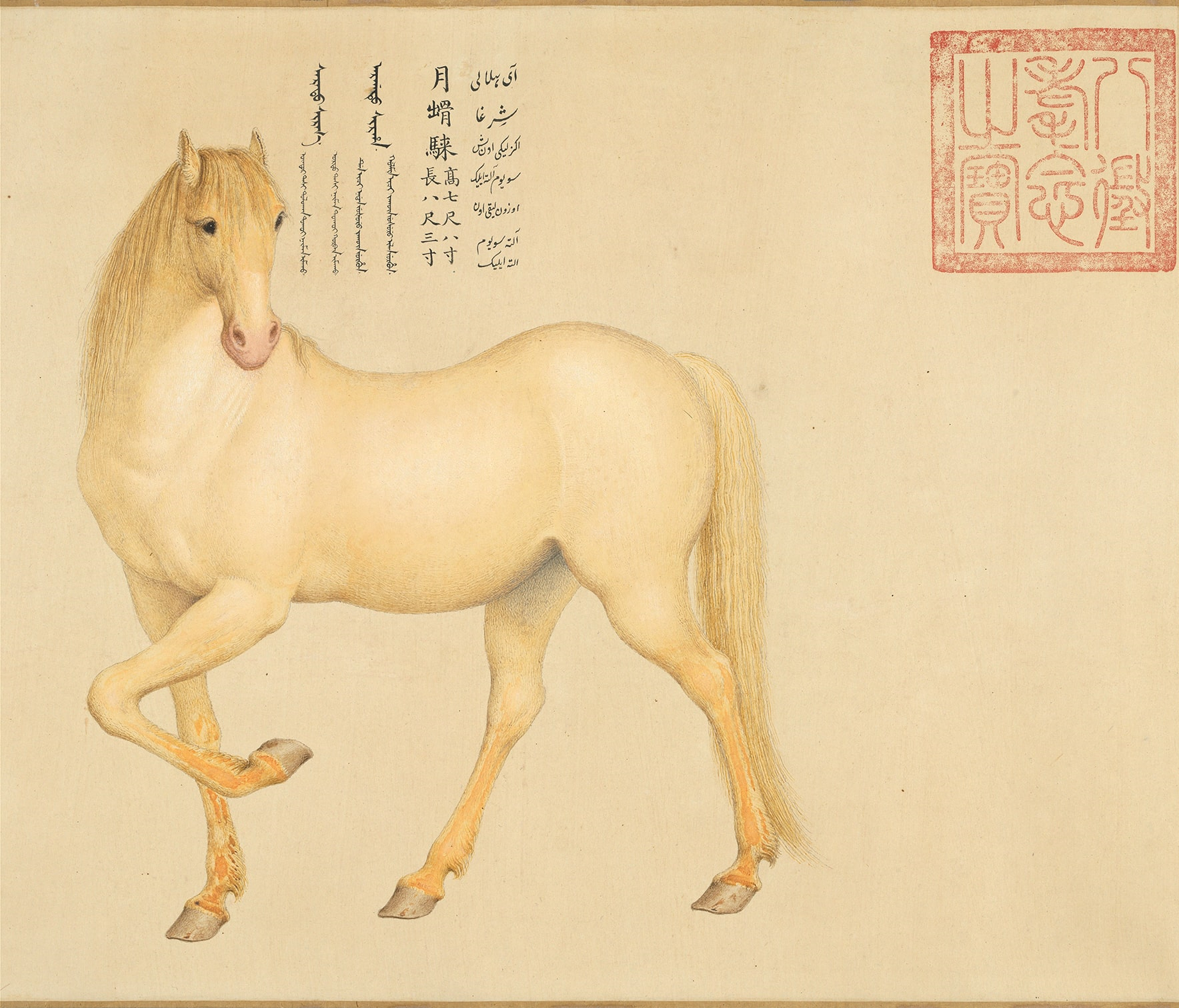
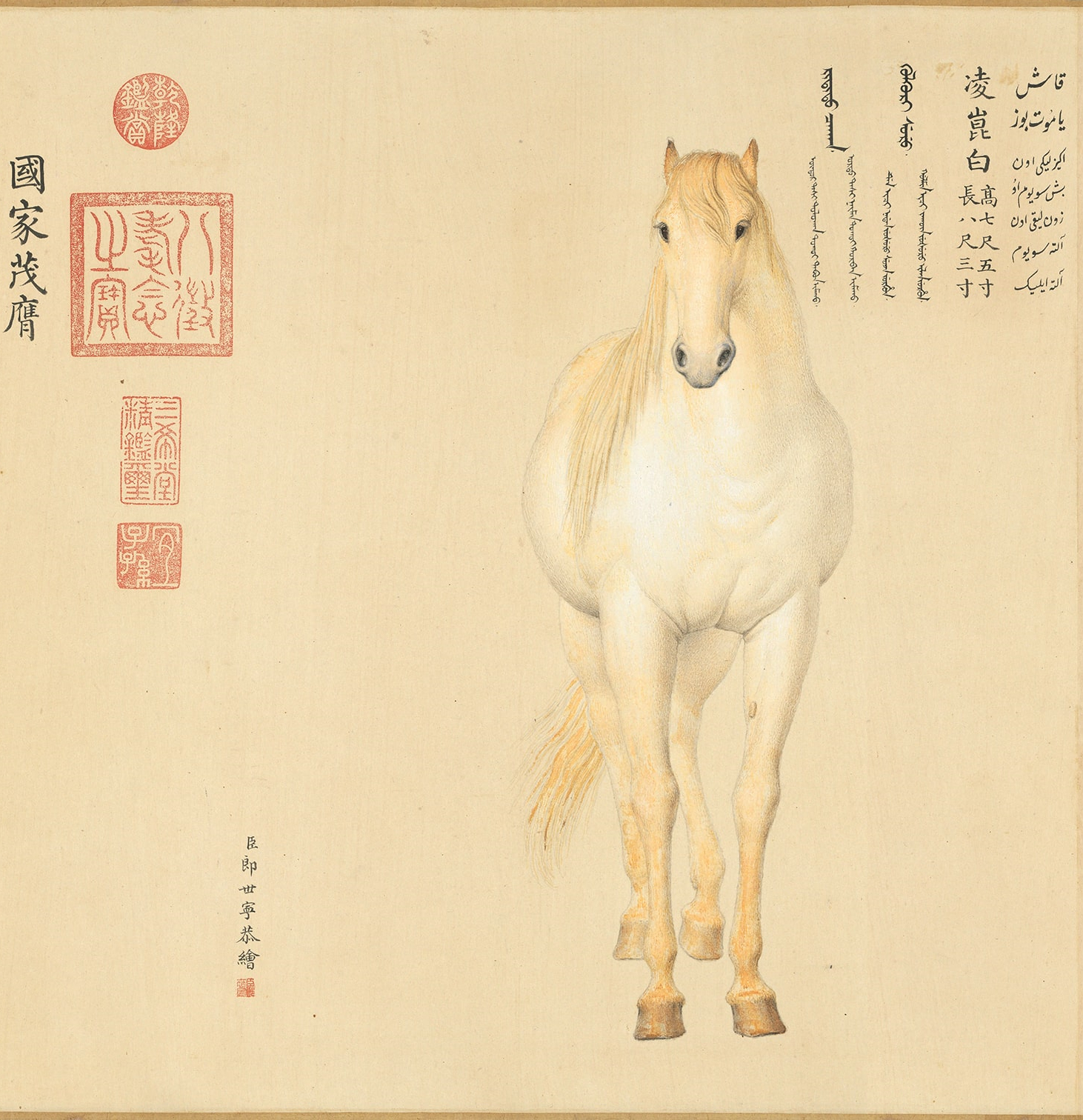
Depiction of the four Afghan horses sent by Ahmad Shah, painted by Qing court painter Giuseppe Castiglione

Ahmad Shah's gifts to the Qing emperor included four horses, which were painted by the Qing court painter, Giuseppe Castiglione. Nonetheless, by the time of the envoy's return journey to Afghanistan, Qianlong made preparations to secure Qing territories.

In 1759, as the revolt of the Altishahr Khojas crumbled, two descendants of the Afaqi Sufi lineage crossed into Badakhshan, being pursued by the Qing forces. Fude, the Qing general of the expedition, demanded that Sultan Shah, the ruler of Badakhshan, to arrest the brothers. Sultan Shah accepted, likely wishing to receive Qing military aid against the Durrani Empire. Distrust occurred, however, due to the Afaqi descendants residing in Badakhshan for months, including Sultan Shah's initial refusal to hand them over, possibly intending to send them to Bukhara. Qianlong threatened invasion, which did not occur as one of the descendant's remains were sent to Yarkand.

The death of the Afaqi brothers spurned relations with the Afghans, causing Sultan Shah to plead to the Qing, claiming that Ahmad Shah intended to exact revenge for their deaths. No immediate Afghan invasion occurred. The Qing however, faced numerous frustrations with their tributaries in Central Asia, alongside a major insurrection in Uch-Turfan that required tremendous effort to defeat.

As a result, Qianlong adopted a policy of strict non-interference, realizing that Qing troops in Altishahr were significantly stretched and spread thin. The Afghans, however, seen as a threat, would show the weakness of Qing control in the region.

In August 1768, Qianlong was informed of the Afghan invasion of Badakhshan led by Shah Wali Khan in May, with Afghan forces seizing Sultan Shah's capital, Fayzabad. A Qing agent, Yunggui, held the position that the Qing should interfere in the conflict. Qianlong, however, affirmed that military intervention would irrational, and strictly forbade any military interference. Historians see this as surprising, as the invasion by the Afghans threatened the Qing Empire itself.

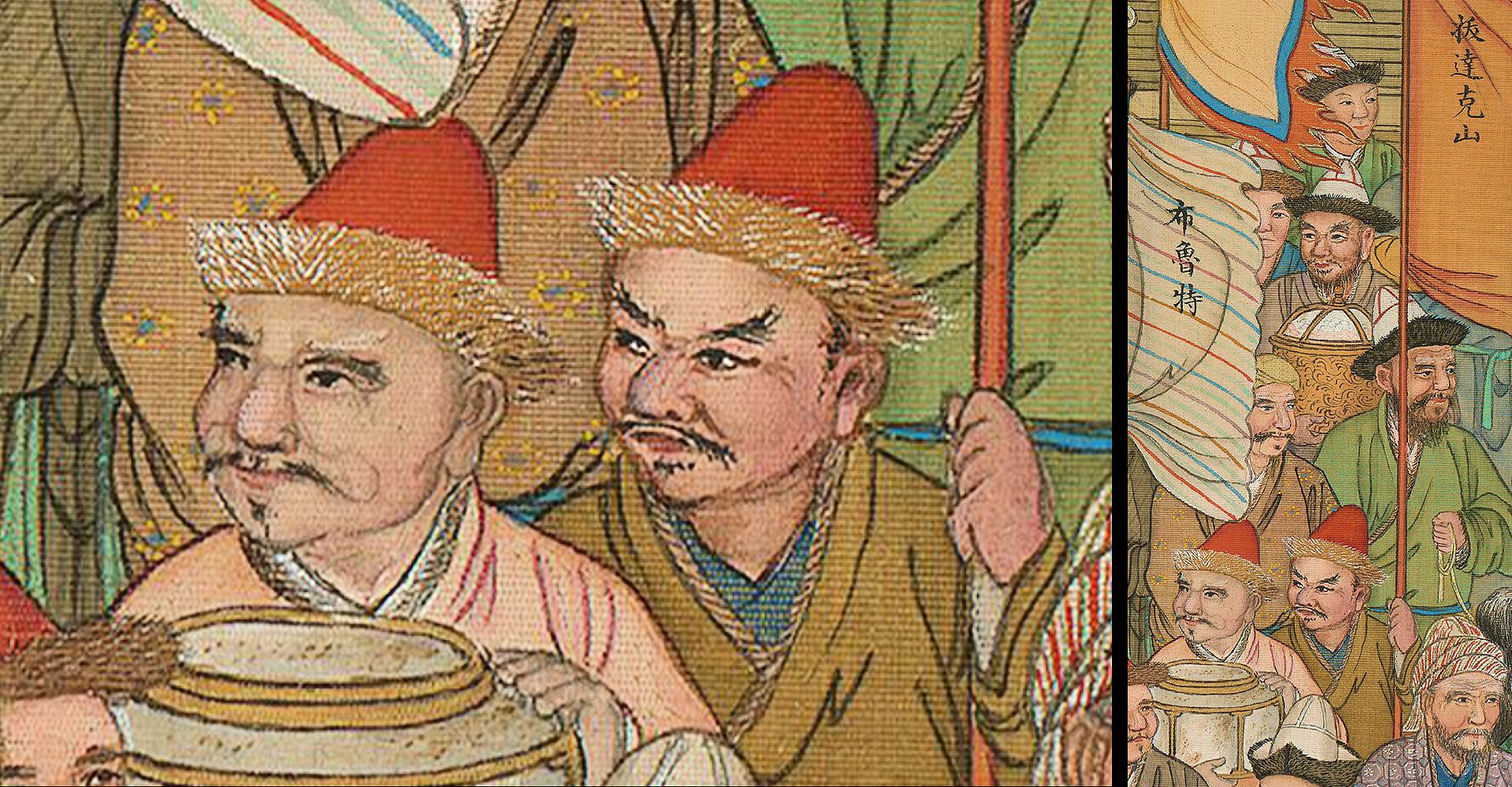
Delegates from Badakhshan in Peking, 1761

Qing sources affirm that the Afghans established Sarimsaq, a child of the Afaqi's who escaped to Badakhshan, in Kunduz. Qianlong was distraught, as another possible revolt could revolve around Sarimsaq, especially after reports came of Muslim travelers and funds being sent to Sarimsaq. This still did not convince Qianlong to act, and he refused to send any negative response to Ahmad Shah at all. During this, Sultan Shah defeated the Afghan governor and reoccupied his capital, but feared another Afghan invasion, sending desperate letters to the Qing in the winter of 1768 to ask for help, claiming that Ahmad Shah would invade next year.

Qianlong rebutted, blaming Sultan Shah for provoking the conflict with the Afghans and affirmed that he would only fight the Afghans if they actually invaded Qing territory. Sultan Shah wrote a letter to Emin Khoja in response in August 1769, expecting aid as he was a vassal, only to find himself abandoned. In December 1769, Sultan Shah wrote another letter that accused Qianlong of failing to uphold his duties. Qianlong rebuked him, and stated that under no circumstances would the Qing aid him.

We have long known that you have previously presented gifts to the Afghans. That you now have no more options but to evade the issue just shows that you are paying tribute to the Afghans! […] If you cannot protect your own lands, and wish to submit to the Afghans, then suit yourself! […] If you wish to rely on our armies to serve your enmities and to subjugate your neighboring tribes, then we will under no circumstances provide you with our troops.

— Qianlong's reply to Sultan Shah's plea for aid against Ahmad Shah

Qianlong had initially considered the Afghans tributaries, but after the former incident, he no longer even sought the prospect of any form of Durrani submission. His reply to Sultan Shah effectively saw the Qing recognize the Afghans as a rival power to them, with Qianlong recognizing that the Afghans were unable to be treated like tributaries. Rather than aiding the ruler of Badakhshan as his initial policy implicated him to, Qianlong instead justified the Afghan invasion, prompted to by overextended armies, the distance, and stability, and gambling on the difficult terrain between the Afghan and Qing realms for safety. Within the year, Ahmad Shah occupied Badakhshan and Sultan Shah was executed.

==== Third Battle of Panipat ====
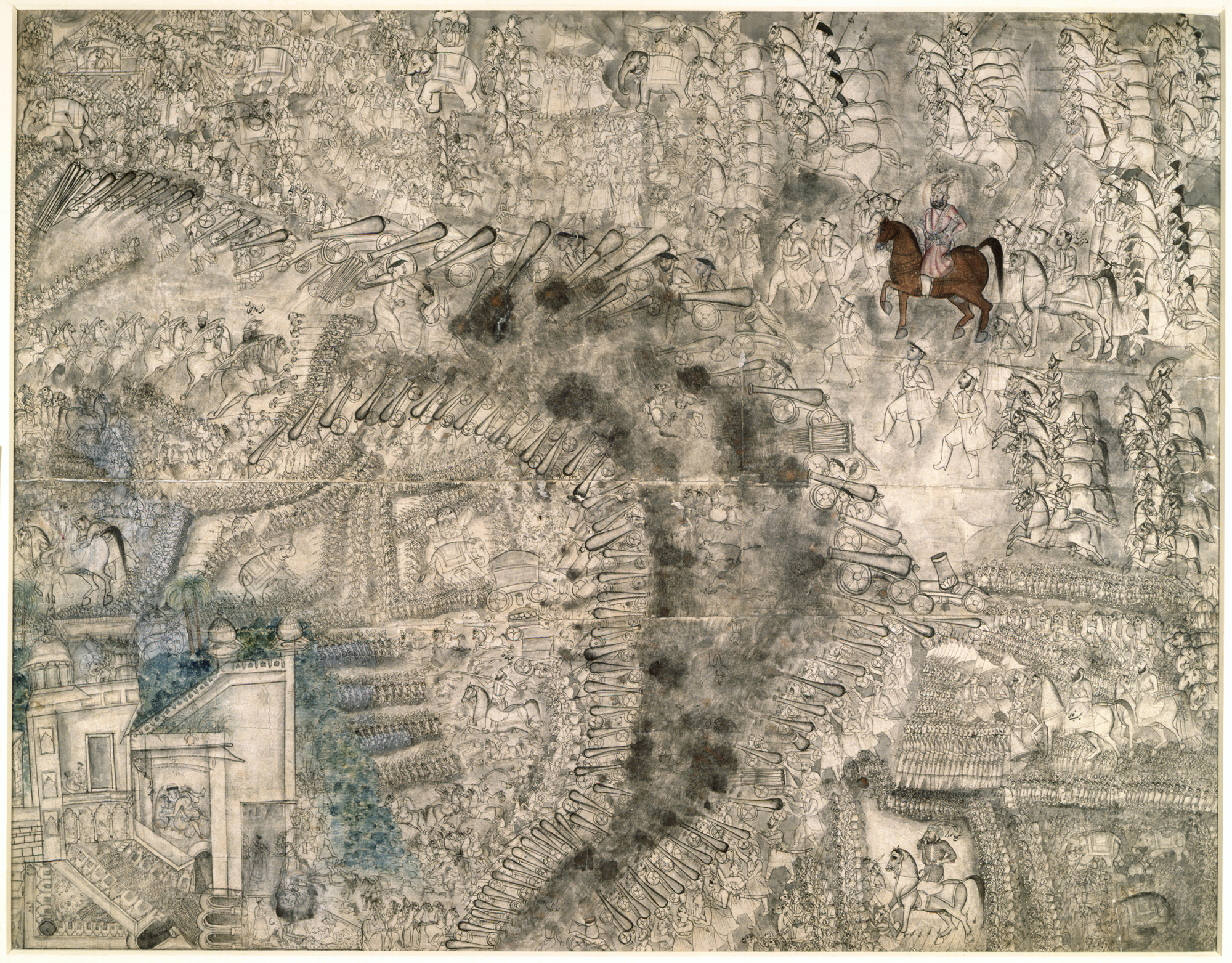
Ahmad Shah Durrani and his coalition decisively defeat the Maratha Confederacy, during the Third Battle of Panipat and restored the Mughal Empire to Shah Alam II.

The Mughal power in northern India had been declining after the death of Emperor Aurangzeb, who died in 1707. In 1751–52, the Ahamdiya treaty was signed between the Marathas and Mughals, when Balaji Bajirao was the Peshwa. Through this treaty, the Marathas controlled virtually the whole of India from their capital at Pune and the Mughal rule was restricted only to Delhi (the Mughals remained the nominal heads of Delhi). Marathas were now straining to expand their area of control towards the Northwest of India. Ahmad Shah sacked the Mughal capital and withdrew with the booty he coveted. To counter the Afghans, Peshwa Balaji Bajirao sent Raghunathrao. He defeated the Rohillas and Afghan garrisons in Punjab and succeeded in ousting Timur Shah and his court from India and brought Lahore, Multan, Kashmir and other subahs on the Indian side of Attock under Maratha rule. Thus, upon his return to Kandahar in 1757, Ahmad was forced to return to India and face the formidable attacks of the Maratha Confederacy.

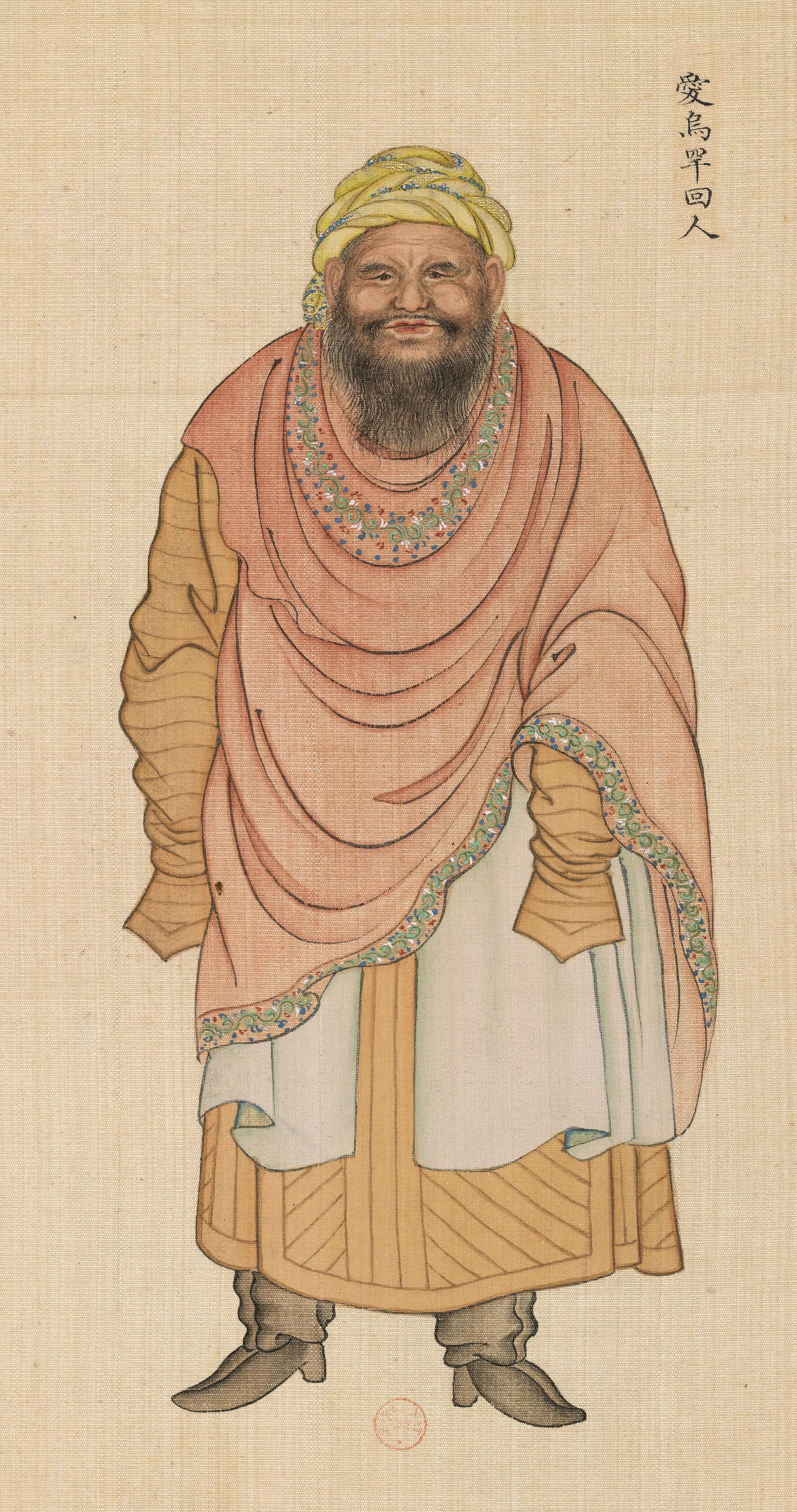
Muslim man from Afghanistan (愛烏罕回人). Huang Qing Zhigong Tu, 1769

Ahmad Shah declared a jihad (or Islamic holy war) against the Marathas, and warriors from various Afghan tribes joined his army, including the Baloch people under the command of Khan of Kalat, Mir Nasir Khan I. Suba Khan Tanoli (Zabardast Khan) was selected as army chief of all military forces. Early skirmishes were followed by victory for the Afghans against the much larger Maratha garrisons in Northwest India and by 1759 Ahmad Shah and his army had reached Lahore and were poised to confront the Marathas. Ahmad Shah Durrani was famous for winning wars much larger than his army. By 1760, the Maratha groups had coalesced into a big enough army under the command of Sadashivrao Bhau. Once again, Panipat was the scene of a confrontation between two warring contenders for control of northern India. The Third Battle of Panipat (14 January 1761), fought between largely Muslim and largely Hindu armies was waged along a twelve-kilometer front. There were rebellions in the north in the region of Bukhara. The Durranis decisively defeated the Marathas in the Third Battle of Panipat on 14 January 1761. The defeat at Panipat resulted in heavy losses for the Marathas, and was a huge setback for Peshwa Balaji Rao. He received the news of the defeat of Panipat on 24 January 1761 at Bhilsa, while leading a reinforcement force. Besides several important generals, he had lost his own son Vishwasrao in the Battle of Panipat. He died on 23 June 1761, and was succeeded by his younger son Madhav Rao I.

==== Final years ====
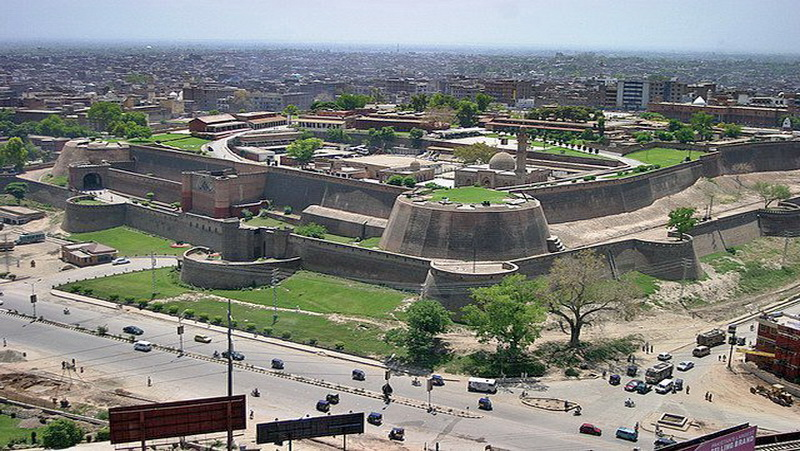
The Bala Hissar fort in Peshawar was one of the royal residences of the Durrani kings.

The victory at Panipat was the high point of Ahmad Shah's—and Afghan—power. However, even prior to his death, the empire began to unravel. In 1762, Ahmad Shah crossed the passes from Afghanistan for the sixth time to subdue the Sikhs. From this time and on, the domination and control of the Empire began to loosen, and by the time of Durrani's death he had lost parts of Punjab to the Sikhs, as well as earlier losses of northern territories to the Uzbeks, necessitating a compromise with them.

He assaulted Lahore and, after taking their holy city of Amritsar, massacred thousands of Sikh inhabitants, destroyed their revered Golden Temple. Within two years, the Sikhs rebelled again and rebuilt their holy city of Amritsar. Ahmad Shah tried several more times to subjugate the Sikhs permanently, but failed. Durrani's forces instigated the Vaḍḍā Ghallūghārā when they killed thousands of Sikhs in the Punjab in 1762. (Note: "Ghallughara is a Punjabi word meaning large scale massacre of people or carnage or holocaust. Two events in Sikh history are particularly known as ghallugharas. 1. Chhota Ghallughara .......[and] 2. Wadda Ghallughara : This took place in 1762 AD. Ahmad Shah Abdali had invaded India again in 1761 AD. This time his main aim was to teach the Sikhs a lesson for capturing Lahore and other important areas. ..... On February 3, 1762 AD he caught up with the Sikh families at Kupp near Malerkotla comprising 35000 women and children. Despite the efforts of Jassa Singh Ahluwalia and other Sikh generals, Abdali was successful in killing every Sikh man, woman and child who was camping at Kupp on February 5, 1762 AD. This massacre has become known in Sikh history as Wadda Glzallughara (major holocaust)." Quoted from Singha (2005), p. 76.) Ahmad Shah also faced other rebellions in the north, and eventually he and the Uzbek Emir of Bukhara agreed that the Amu Darya would mark the division of their lands. Ahmad Shah retired to his home in the mountains east of Kandahar, where he died in 1772. He had succeeded to a remarkable degree in balancing tribal alliances and hostilities, and in directing tribal energies away from rebellion. He earned recognition as Ahmad Shah Baba, or "Father" of Afghanistan.

=== Other Durrani rulers in the Empire (1772–1823) ===
Ahmad Shah's successors governed so ineptly during a period of profound unrest that within fifty years of his death, the Durrani empire per se was at an end, and Afghanistan was embroiled in civil war. Much of the territory conquered by Ahmad Shah fell to others in this half century. By 1818, the Sadozai rulers who succeeded Ahmad Shah controlled little more than Kabul and the surrounding territory within a 160-kilometer radius. They not only lost the outlying territories but also alienated other tribes and lineages among the Durrani Pashtuns.

==== Humayun Mirza (1772) ====
Prior to his death, Ahmad Shah announced that his son, Timur Shah, would inherit the empire. This was controversial in the court, as many powerful military and tribal leaders had supported Ahmad Shah's elder son, Sulaiman Shah; they attempted to convince Ahmad Shah to change his mind. However, Ahmad Shah said he felt that Sulaiman was violent, unpopular with the Kandahari Durranis, and would be an inferior leader. Timur's appointment would also possibly limit the power held by Senior Generals and the Durrani Tribal Council. Timur was in Herat, however far from his ailing father; Begi Khan Bamizai and Sardar Jahan Khan used this opportunity to turn Ahmad Shah against his son. When Timur came to see his father, he turned him away. Recognizing that a conflict with his brother was imminent, Timur began building his forces; in this task he was interrupted by Darwish 'Ali Khan's revolt, an action was that possibly orchestrated by those loyal to Sulaiman. Timur promised Darwish Ali pardon and power, then executed him after he arrived in Herat.

Upon Ahmad Shah's death in 1772, Shah Wali Khan and Sardar Jahan Khan pretended that the Shah was not dead, merely ill, and was being kept separate from all but the most trusted officials. They began a march, with his body, to the capital, Kandahar; upon arriving, they told Sulaiman of his father's death and declared Sulaiman was to be king. Timur received word of this from Amirs who had turned against Shah Wali, and he too went to Kandahar. The two sides met at Farah, where Shah Wali and his sons were assassinated. Shah Sulayman surrendered to Timur Shah and became loyal, according to Amir Habibullah Khan. Timur Shah ascended the throne in November 1772.

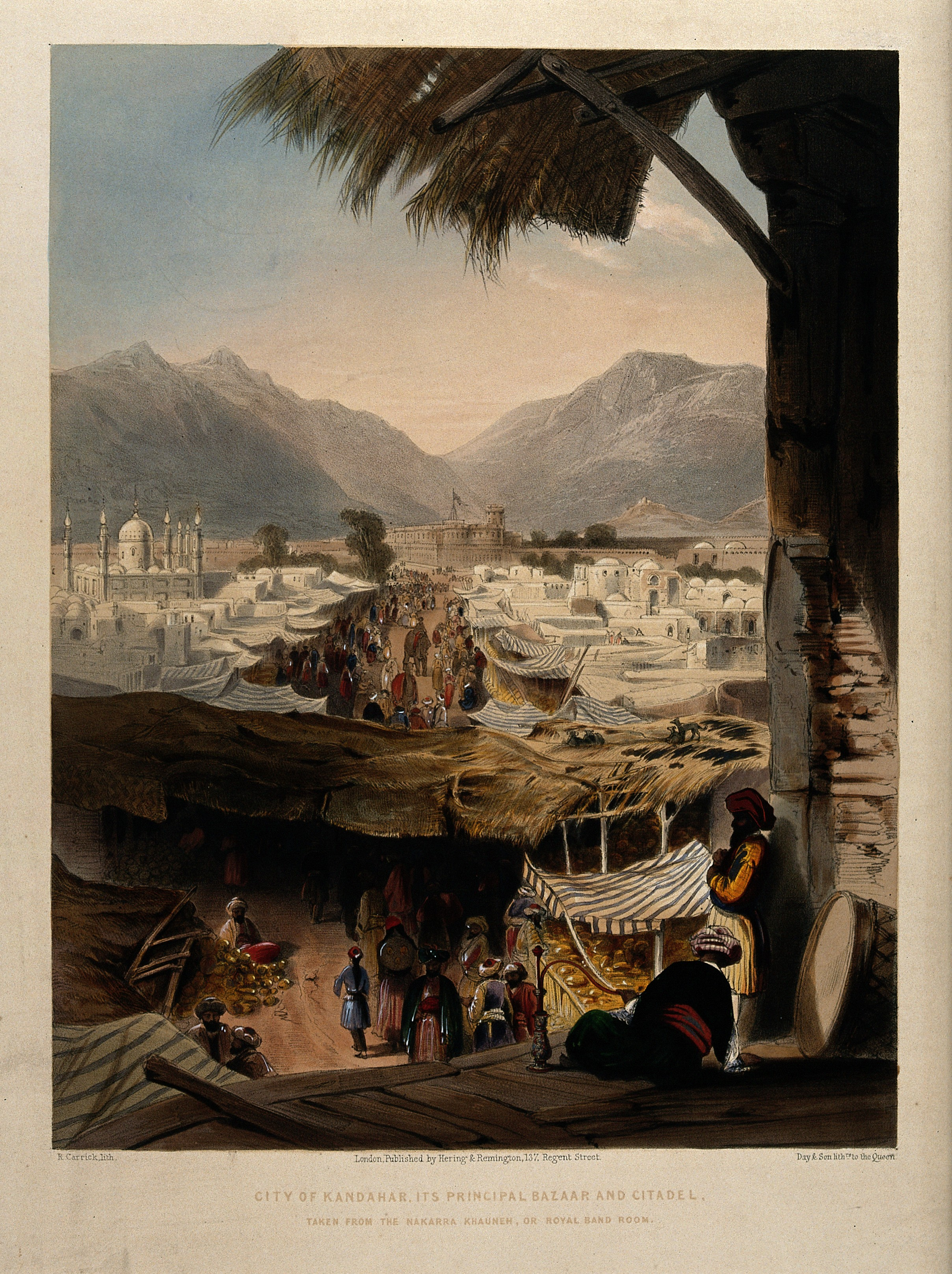
City of Kandahar, its principal bazaar and citadel, as seen from the Nakkara Khauna

==== Timur Shah (1772–1793) ====
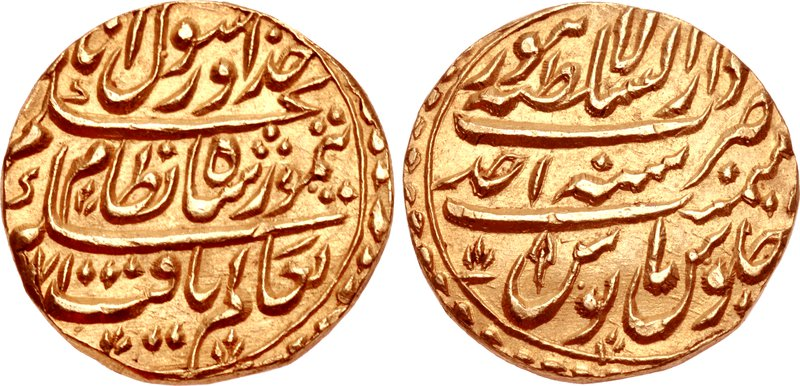
Coin of Timur Shah Durrani as Nizam of the Punjab, minted in Lahore, dated 1757/8

==== Zaman Shah (1793–1801) ====
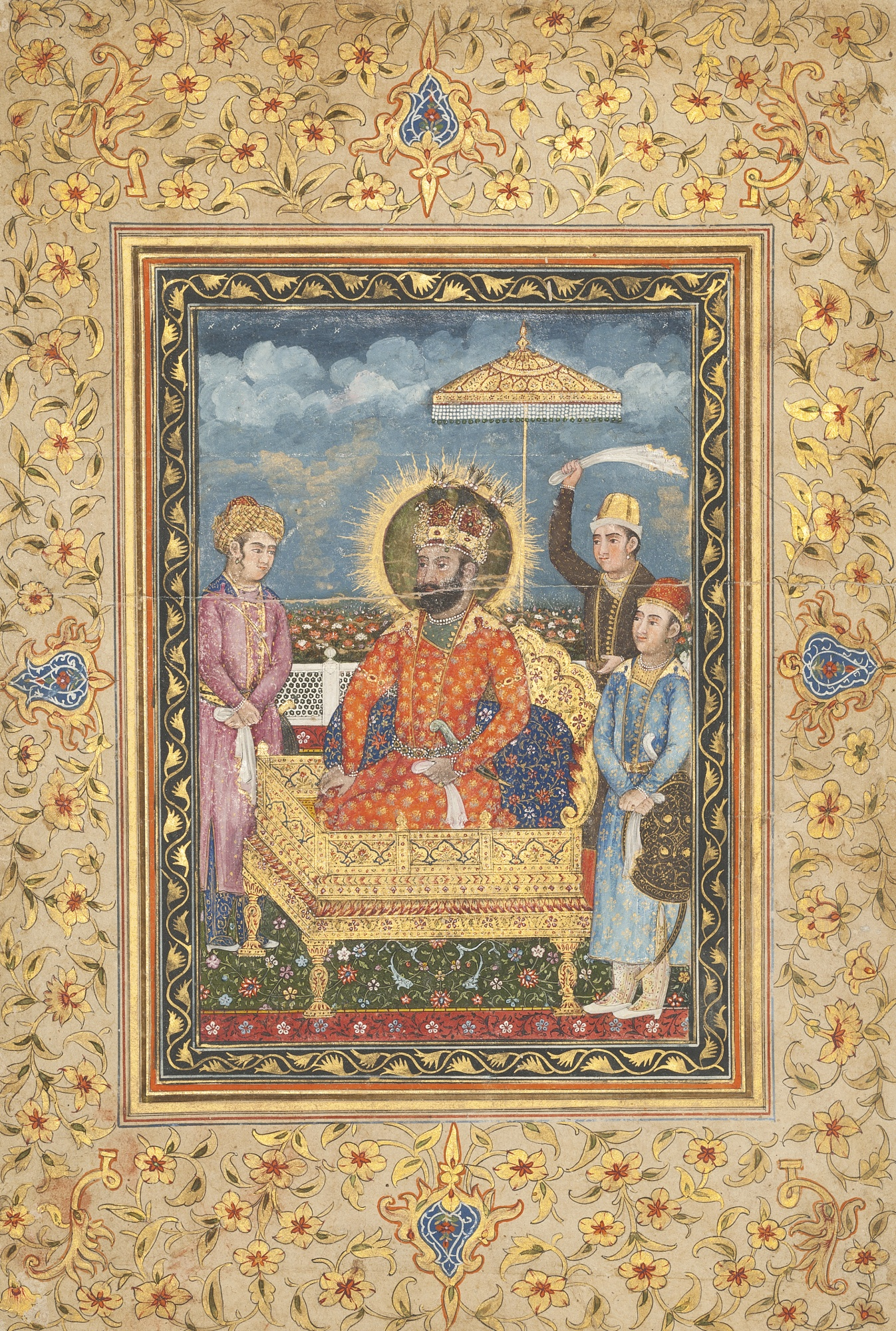
Zaman Shah Durrani being enthroned

After the death of Timur Shah, three of his sons, the governors of Kandahar, Herat and Kabul, contended for the succession. Zaman Shah, governor of Kabul, held the field by virtue of being in control of the capital, and became shah at the age of twenty-three. Many of his half-brothers were imprisoned on their arrival in the capital for the purpose, ironically, of electing a new shah. The quarrels among Timur's descendants that threw Afghanistan into turmoil also provided the pretext for the interventions of outside forces.

The efforts of the Sadozai heirs of Timur to impose a true monarchy on the truculent Pashtun tribes, and their efforts to rule absolutely and without the advice of the other major Pashtun tribal leaders, were ultimately unsuccessful. The Sikhs started to rise under the command of Sikh Jat chief, Ranjit Singh, who succeeded in wresting power from Zaman's forces. Later, when Zaman was blinded by his brother, Ranjit Singh gave him asylum in Punjab.

Zaman's downfall was triggered by his attempts to consolidate power. Although it had been through the support of the Barakzai chief, Painda Khan, that he had come to the throne, Zaman soon began to remove prominent Barakzai leaders from positions of power and replace them with men of his own lineage, the Sadozai. This upset the delicate balance of Durrani tribal politics that Ahmad Shah had established and may have prompted Painda Khan and other Durrani chiefs to plot against the shah. Painda Khan and the chiefs of the Nurzai and the Alizai Durrani clans were executed, as was the chief of the Qizilbash clan. Painda Khan's son fled to Iran and pledged the substantial support of his Barakzai followers to a rival claimant to the throne, Zaman's younger brother, Mahmud Shah. The clans of the chiefs Zaman had executed joined forces with the rebels, and they took Kandahar without bloodshed. Mahmud Shah had then proceeded to march to Kabul, where he met Zaman Shah and his army on the way from Ghanzi to Kabul, Zaman Shah was decisively defeated, including portions of his army fleeing to Mahmud Shah's cause. Mahmud Shah ordered the lancing of Zaman Shah's eyes, and had succeeded Zaman Shah on the throne of the Durrani Empire.

==== Mahmud Shah (first reign, 1801–1803) ====
Zaman Shah's overthrow in 1801 was not the end of civil strife in Afghanistan, but the beginning of even greater violence. Mahmud Shah's first reign lasted for only two years before he was replaced by Shuja Shah.

==== Shuja Shah (1803–1809 and 1839–1842) ====
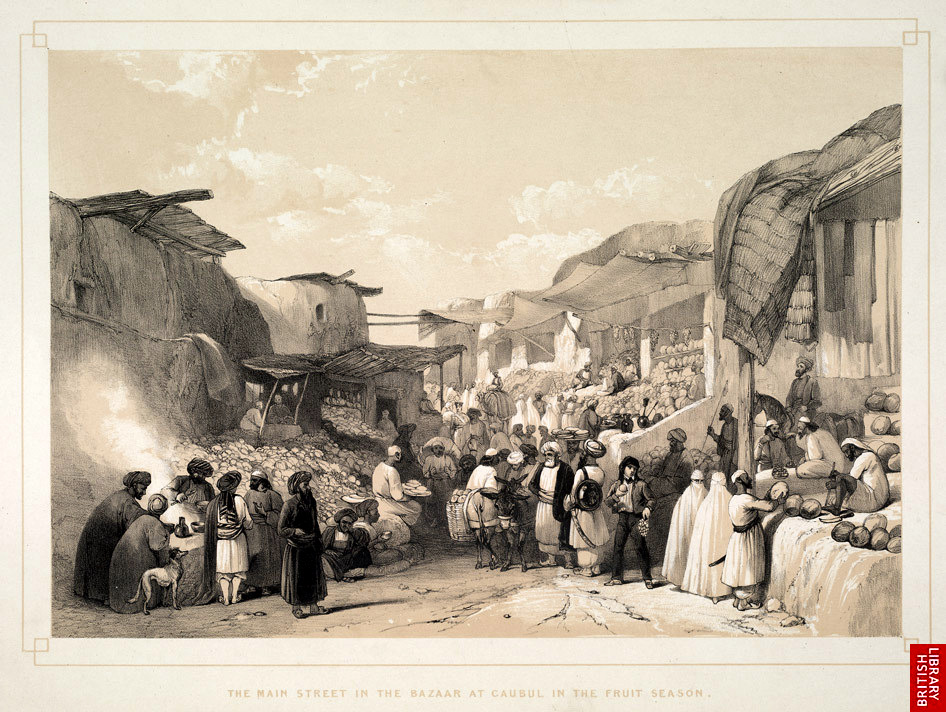
The main street in the bazaar at Kabul, 1842 James Atkinson watercolour painting.

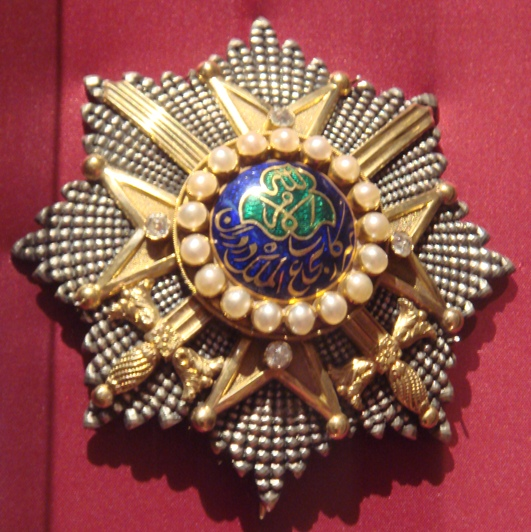
Order of the Durrani Empire, founded by Shuja Shah in 1839.

Yet another of Timur Shah's sons, Shuja Shah (or Shah Shuja), ruled for only six years. On June 7, 1809, Shuja Shah signed a treaty with the British East India Company, which included a clause stating that he would oppose the passage of foreign troops through his territories. This agreement, the first Afghan pact with a European power, stipulated joint action in case of Franco-Persian aggression against Afghan or British dominions. Only a few weeks after signing the agreement, Shuja was deposed by his predecessor, Mahmud. Much later, he was reinstated by the British, ruling during 1839–1842. Two of his sons also ruled for a brief period in 1842.

==== Mahmud Shah (second reign, 1809–1818) ====
Mahmud's second reign lasted 9 years, where he had further attempted to consolidate power, but was deposed by his brother in 1818, Mahmud's reign was also disputed in 1810, while he was campaigning, another one of Timur Shah Durrani's sons had seized the throne, but was defeated by Shah Mahmud in 1810.

==== Abbas Mirza (1810) ====
While Mahmud Shah was campaigning in 1810, another one of Timur Shah's sons placed himself in rule at Kabul. Abbas Mirza ruled for a short period of time before being defeated by Mahmud Shah once he returned from campaign.

==== Sultan Ali Shah (1818–1819) ====
Ali Shah was another son of Timur Shah. He seized power for a brief period in 1818–1819. in 1818 or 1819, He was strangled by his brother, Isma'il.

==== Ayub Shah (1819–1823) ====
Ayub Shah was another son of Timur Shah, who took control of the Durrani Empire after the death of Ali Shah Durrani. The Durrani Empire lost its control over Kashmir to the Sikh Empire in the Battle of Shopian in 1819. Ayub Shah was himself later deposed, and presumably killed in 1823.

=== Shah Shuja and the First Anglo Afghan War (1839–1842) ===
In the 19th century as a whole, Britain and Russia were interlocked in a battle for influence in South Asia. Russian advance was trudging through Central Asia, while the British were landing in the masses on the Indian subcontinent. The "Army of the Indus", full of both British and Indian infantrymen and cavalrymen, was intent on restoring Shah Shuja Durrani, the deposed monarch to the throne of Afghanistan. By March 1839, the British had already crossed into the Emirate of Afghanistan.

== Military ==
The Durrani military was based on cavalry armed with flintlocks who performed hit-and-run attacks, combining new technology in firearms with Turco-Mongol tactics. The core of the Durrani army were the 10,000 sher-bacha (blunderbuss)-carrying mounted ghulams (slave-soldiers) of which a third were previously Shia soldiers (Qizilbash) of Nader Shah. Many others were also former troops of Nader Shah. The bulk of the army were Afghan irregular tribal cavalry armed with lance and broadsword. Mounted archers were still used but were uncommon due to the difficulty of training them. Infantry played a very small role in the Durrani army and, with the exception of light swivel guns mounted on camels, the Zamburak, so did artillery.

== List of monarchs ==
=== Empire (1747–1823; 1839–1842) ===
Name	Lifespan	Reign start	Reign end	Notes	Family	Image
Ahmad Shah Durrani: احمد شاه دراني	1720 – 16 October 1772	July 1747	16 October 1772		Durrani	
Sulaiman Shah Durrani: سليمان شاه دراني	Unknown	16 October 1772	November 1772		Durrani	
Timur Shah Durrani: تېمور شاه دراني	December 1746 – 20 May 1793	November 1772	20 May 1793		Durrani	
Zaman Shah Durrani: زمان شاه دراني	1767 – 13 September 1845	20 May 1793	25 July 1801		Durrani	
Mahmud Shah Durrani (1st reign): محمود شاه دراني	1769 – 18 April 1829	25 July 1801	13 July 1803		Durrani	
Shuja Shah Durrani (1st reign): شجاع شاه دراني	4 November 1785 – 5 April 1842	13 July 1803	3 May 1809		Durrani	
Mahmud Shah Durrani (2nd reign): محمود شاه دراني	1769 – 18 April 1829	3 May 1809	February 1811		Durrani	
Abbas Shah Durrani: عباس شاه دراني	Died February 1811	February 1811	February 1811		Durrani	
Mahmud Shah Durrani (3rd reign): محمود شاه دراني	1769 – 18 April 1829	February 1811	September 1818		Durrani	
Ali Shah Durrani: علي شاه دراني	Died December 1818	September 1818	December 1818		Durrani	
Ayub Shah Durrani: ايوب شاه دراني	Died 1 October 1837	December 1818	1823		Durrani	
Shuja Shah Durrani (2nd reign): شجاع شاه دراني	4 November 1785 – 5 April 1842	7 August 1839	5 April 1842		Durrani	
Fateh Jang Durrani: فتح جنگ دراني	Died 25 June 1855	5 April 1842	12 October 1842		Durrani	
Shahpur Shah Durrani: شاهپور شاه دراني	Died 1884	12 October 1842	December 1842		Durrani	

=== Kandahar (1793–1795) ===
Name	Lifespan	Reign start	Reign end	Notes	Family	Image
Humayun Shah Durrani: همایون شاه درانی	Died December 1795	May 1793	December 1795	Rose in revolt against his uterine brother King Zaman Shah Durrani by attempting to conquer Kandahar in three separate occasions	Sadozai	

=== Herat (1793–1863) ===
Name	Lifespan	Reign start	Reign end	Notes	Family	Image
Mahmud Shah Durrani	1769 – 18 April 1829	20 May 1793	14 October 1797		Sadozai	
Firuz al-Din Mirza Durrani	Unknown	25 July 1801	September 1818		Sadozai	
Fath Ali Khan	1758 – August 1818	September 1818	1826		Barakzai	
Mahmud Shah Durrani	1769 – 18 April 1829	1826	March 1842		Sadozai	
Kamran Mirza Durrani	Died 1842	March 1842	23 June 1851		Sadozai	
Yar Mohammad Khan	1790–1851	23 June 1851	15 September 1855		Alakozai	
Said Mohammad Khan	Unknown	15 September 1855	28 April 1856		Alakozai	
Mohammad Yusuf Mirza Durrani	Died March 1857	28 April 1856	25 October 1856		Sadozai	
Isa Khan Bardurrani	Unknown	25 October 1856	September 1857		Bardurrani	
Sultan Ahmad Khan	Died January 1863	27 July 1857	6 March 1863		Barakzai	
Shah Nawaz Khan	Unknown	6 March 1863	27 June 1863		Barakzai	

== See also ==
- List of Durrani Wazirs
- List of Pashtun empires and dynasties

== Sources ==
- Dupree, Louis (1980). Afghanistan. Princeton University Press. ISBN 0691000239.
- Eijk, Juul; Khan, Timur (2023). "'Do You Not Bow before Heaven?': The First Qing- Durrānī Encounter, the Tributary Non-relationship, and Disorder on a Shared Frontier" (PDF). Journal of the Economic and Social History of the Orient. 66 (5–6): 707–741. doi:10.1163/15685209-12341605. ISSN 1568-5209.
- Elphinstone, Mountstuart (1815). An account of the kingdom of Caubul, and its dependencies in Persia, Tartary and India: comprising a view of the Afghaun nation and a history of the Dooraunee monarchy. London: Longman, Hurst, Rees, Orme, and Brown.
- Fraser-Tytler, William Kerr (1953). Afghanistan: A Study of Political Developments in Central and Southern Asia. London: Oxford University Press. OCLC 409453.
- Green, Nile (2019). "The Rise of New Imperial and National Languages (ca. 1800 – ca. 1930)". In Green, Nile (ed.). The Persianate World: The Frontiers of a Eurasian Lingua Franca. University of California Press. ISBN 978-0520972100.
- Hanifi, Shah Mahmoud (2011). Connecting Histories in Afghanistan: Market Relations and State Formation on a Colonial Frontier. Stanford University Press. ISBN 9780804777773.
- Katib, Fayz Muhammad (2013) [1912]. The History Of Afghanistan (Sirāj Al Tawārīkh). Vol. 1 - The Saduza’i Era 1747-1843. Translated by R.D. Mcchesney. Brill. ISBN 9789004234925.
- Lee, Jonathan L. (1996). The Ancient Supremacy: Bukhara, Afghanistan and the Battle for Balkh, 1731–1901 (illustrated ed.). Brill. ISBN 9004103996.
- Lee, Jonathan L. (2022). Afghanistan A History From 1260 To The Present. Reaktion Books. ISBN 9781789145885.
- Malleson, George Bruce (1878). History of Afghanistan, from the Earliest Period to the Outbreak of the War of 1878. London: W.H. Allen & Co. OCLC 4219393.
- Newby, Laura J. (2005). The Empire And the Khanate: A Political History of Qing Relations With Khoqand C1760-1860. Brill. ISBN 9789004145504.
- Roy, Kaushik (2004). India's Historic Battles: From Alexander the Great to Kargil. Orient Blackswan. ISBN 9788178241098.
- Runion, Meredith L. (2017). The History of Afghanistan (2nd, illustrated ed.). Greenwood. ISBN 9781610697774.
- Schimmel, AnneMarie (1975). Pain and Grace: A study of Two Mystical Writers of Eighteenth-Century Muslim India. Brill.
- Singh, Ganda (1959). Ahmad Shah Durrani: Father of Modern Afghanistan. London: Asia Publishing House. OCLC 4341271.
- Singh, Sarina (2008). Pakistan and the Karakoram Highway. Lonely Planet. ISBN 9781741045420.
- Singha, H.S. (2005) [2000]. "Ghallughara" (PDF). The Encyclopedia of Sikhism. New Delhi: Hemkunt. ISBN 8170103010.
- Tanner, Stephen (2002). Afghanistan: a military history from Alexander the Great to the fall of the Taliban. New York: Da Capo Press. ISBN 0-306-81164-2.
