= Fateh Jang Durrani =

Shah of the Durrani Empire

Fateh Jang Durrani فتح جنگ دراني
- His Majesty, Grace of God, King Sultan Fath Jang the Brave, Abdali, Pearl of the Pearls, King of Afghanistan (Note: Persian: اعلی حضرت عنایت الهی پادشاه سلطان فتح جنگ بهادر ابدالی در دران پادشاه افغانستان, romanized: A'lā Hazrat Ināyat-i Ilāhī Pādishāh Sultān Fatih Jang Bahādur Abdālī Durr-i Durrān, Pādishāh-i Afghānistān)
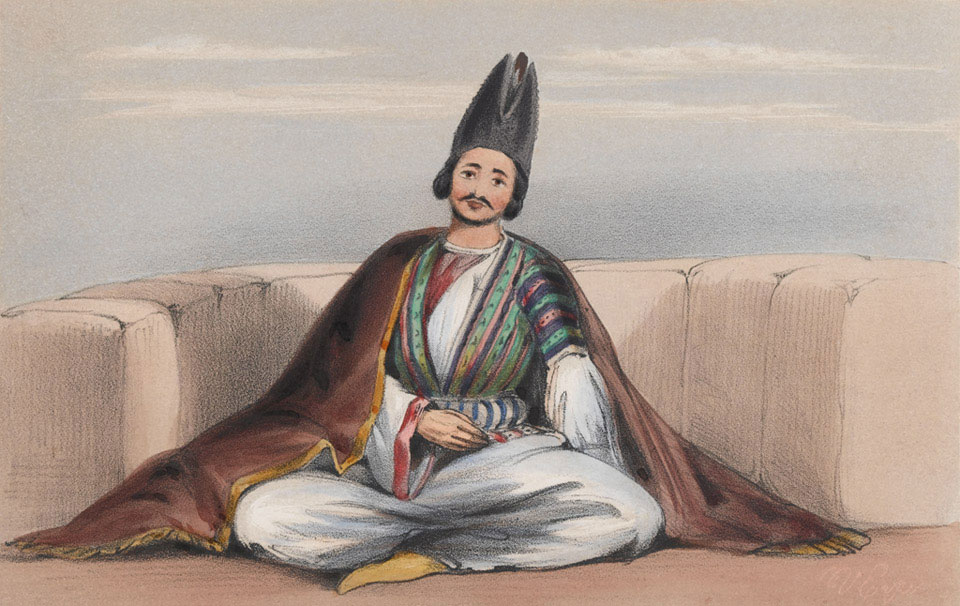
- Prince Futty Jung, by Vincent Eyre (c. 1842)

Shah of the Durrani Empire
- Reign: 5 April 1842 – 12 October 1842 (6 months and 1 week)
- Coronation: 29 June 1842; Bala Hissar, Kabul, Durrani Empire
- Predecessor: Shuja Shah Durrani
- Successor: Shahpur Shah Durrani
- Died: 25 June 1855; Ludhiana, British India
- Spouse: Aga Begum Sahiba; Begum Jan; Khadija Begum; Kishtwar Sultan Begum; Thuke un-nisa Begum; Mubarak Sultan Begum; Sumbul Khanum; Bibi Jawahir Khanum; Khurdi Jan Khanum; Sahib Jan Khanum
- Issue: Shujaat Jang; Unknown daughter
- House: Durrani
- Father: Shuja Shah Durrani
- Mother: Wafa Begum
- Religion: Sunni Islam
- Military career
- Conflicts: First Anglo-Afghan War (surrendered)

Fateh Jang Durrani, (Note: Pashto: فتح جنگ دراني, romanized: Fath Jang Durrāni [pä.t̪i/fä.t̪i(h) d͡ʒäŋg d̪u(ɾ).ɾɑ.ni]; Persian: فتح جنگ درانی, romanized: Fath Jang Durrānī [fä.t̪ʰɪ(ʱ) d͡ʒäŋɡ d̪ʊɾ.ɾɑː.níː]) also known as Fath Jang Shah, Prince Fatteh Jang, and Prince Futty Jung, was briefly the ruler of Afghanistan following the death of his father, Shuja Shah Durrani.

== Early life ==
Fateh Jang was born into a Sadozai family to his father Shuja Shah Durrani, and to his mother Wafa Begum of the Barakzai tribe, alongside his brothers Mohammad Akbar Mirza and Shahpur Mirza.

== Reign ==
Despite his elder uterine brother Timur Mirza's position of being the heir apparent, Fateh Jang succeeded after the assassination of his father Shuja Shah Durrani on 5 April 1842. Jang was mostly an unpopular leader of his time due to his oppressive nature, and was known to sexually assault and personally rape members of his own garrison in Kandahar.

Aware of no external assistance during his reign, Jang soon chose to abdicate and withdraw alongside George Pollock's retreating British forces, and was succeeded by his brother, Shahpur Shah Durrani, who held the throne briefly before being deposed by the request of Mohammad Akbar Khan's nobles, being replaced by Dost Mohammad Khan. Jang was given a residency in Punjab, British Raj.
