= Durrani dynasty =

1747–1856 dynasty of the Durrani Empire

Durrani Dynasty د درانيانو کورنۍ
- Parent house: Durrani
- Origin: Durrani Empire
- Founded: July 1747; 279 years ago
- Founder: Ahmad Shah Durrani
- Final ruler: Sultan Shahpur Durrani (Empire); Mohammad-Yusuf Mirza Durrani (Herat)
- Titles: Shah; Pearl of Pearls (Note: Persian: در دران, romanized: Durr-i Durrān, pronounced [ˈdurːi durˈraːn])
- Connected families: Timurid dynasty (Family In "Laws")
- Traditions: Sunni Islam
- Estate: Afghanistan
- Dissolution: 28 April 1856

Durranis
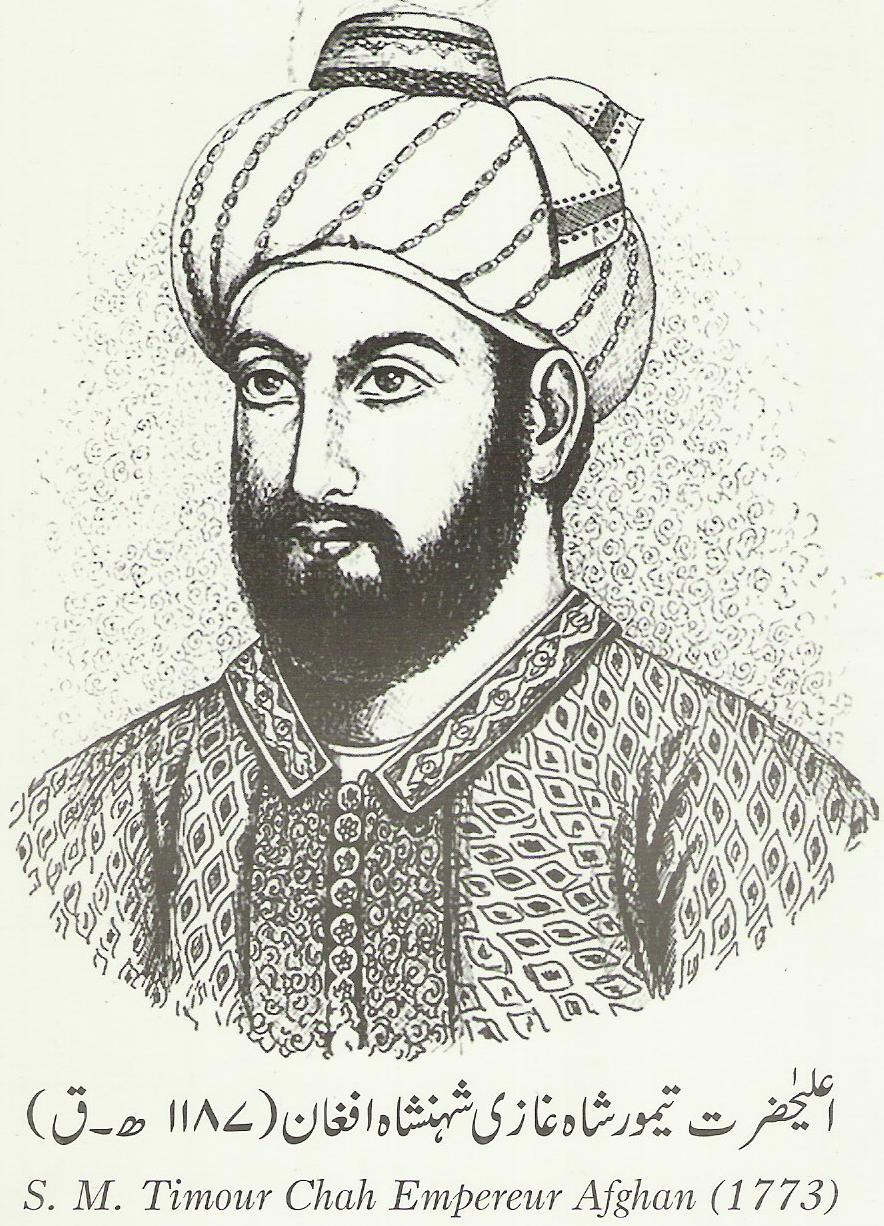

Total population
- 10 million+

Regions with significant populations
- Afghanistan

Languages
- Pashto (primary); Persian (bureaucracy)

Religion
- Predominantly Sunni Islam

The Durrani dynasty, (Note: Pashto: د درانيانو کورنۍ, romanized: Də Durānyānyo koranəy, pronounced [də dʊrɑnˈjɑnjo korɐˈnəɪ]; Persian: سلسله درانیان, romanized: Silsila-yi Durrāniyān, cyrillized: Силсилаи Дуррониён, pronounced [silsiˈlaji durˌraːniˈjaːn]) also called the Sadozai dynasty, was founded in 1747 by Ahmad Shah Durrani at Kandahar, Afghanistan. He united all Pashtun tribes and created the Durrani Empire. which at its peak included the modern-day Afghanistan, Pakistan, as well as some parts of northeastern Iran, eastern Turkmenistan, and northwestern India, including the Kashmir Valley. The Durranis were replaced by the Barakzai dynasty in 1823.

Ahmad Shah and his descendants were from the Sadozai subclan of Popalzai line of the Durranis (formerly known as Abdalis), making them the second Pashtun rulers of Kandahar after the Hotak dynasty. The Durranis were notable in the second half of the 18th century mainly due to the leadership of Ahmad Shah Durrani.

== History ==
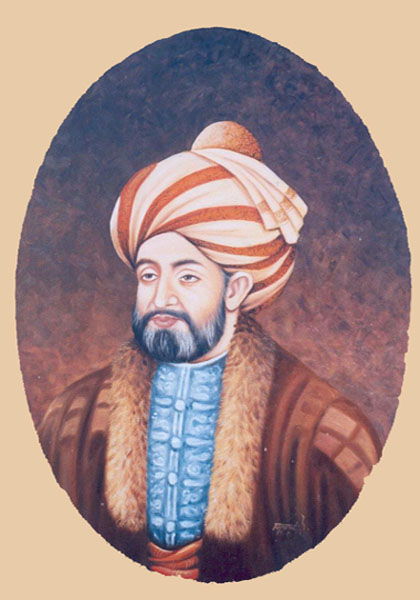
Ahmad Shah Durrani founder of Durrani dynasty

Nader Shah's rule ended in June 1747 after being murdered by his Persian soldiers. In July 1747, when the chiefs of the Afghans met at a loya jirga (grand council) in Kandahar to select a new ruler for the Abdali confederation, the young 25-year-old Ahmad Khan was chosen. Despite being younger than other claimants, Ahmad Khan had several overriding factors in his favour:

- He was a direct descendant of Asadullah Khan, patriarch of the Sadozai clan, the most prominent tribe amongst the Pashtun people at the time;
- He was unquestionably a charismatic leader and seasoned warrior who had at his disposal a trained, mobile force of 4,000 loyal cavalrymen;
- Not least, he possessed a substantial part of Nadir Shah's treasury, including the Koh-i-Noor diamond.

One of Ahmad Khan's first acts as chief was to adopt the title Padshah durr-i durrān (King, "pearl of the age" or "pearl of pearls"). The name may have been suggested, as some claim, from a dream, or as others claim, from the pearl earrings worn by the royal guard of Nadir Shah. The Abdali Pashtuns were known thereafter as the Durrani, and the name of the Abdali confederation was changed to Durrani.

Ahmad Shah began his campaign by capturing Ghazni from the Ghilji Pashtuns, and wresting Kabul and Peshawar from Mughal-appointed governor Nasir Khan, conquering the area up to the Indus River in 1747. In 1749, the Mughal ruler was induced to cede Sindh, the Punjab region and the important trans Indus River to Ahmad Shah in order to save his capital from Afghan attack. Having thus gained substantial territories to the east without a fight, Ahmad Shah turned westward to take possession of Herat, which was ruled by Nader Shah's grandson, Shah Rukh of Persia. Herat fell to Ahmad after almost a year of siege and bloody conflict, as did Mashad (in present-day Iran). Ahmad Shah next sent an army to subdue the areas north of the Hindu Kush mountains. In short order, the powerful army brought under its control the Turkmen, Uzbek, Tajik and Hazara tribes of northern Afghanistan. Ahmad Shah invaded the remnants of the Mughal Empire a third time, and then a fourth, consolidating control over the Punjab and Kashmir regions. Then, early in 1757, he sacked Delhi, but permitted the Mughal dynasty to remain in nominal control of the city as long as the ruler acknowledged Ahmad Shah's suzerainty over Punjab, Sindh, and Kashmir. Leaving his second son Timur Shah to safeguard his interests, Ahmad Shah left Hindustan (India) to return to Afghanistan.

Alarmed by the expansion of China's Qing Dynasty up to the western border of Kazakhstan, Ahmad Shah attempted to rally neighbouring Muslim khanates and the Kazakhs to unite and attack China, ostensibly to liberate its western Muslim subjects. Ahmad Shah halted trade with Qing China and dispatched troops to Kokand. However, with his campaigns in India exhausting the state treasury, and with his troops stretched thin throughout Central Asia, Ahmad Shah lacked sufficient resources to do anything except to send envoys to Beijing for unsuccessful talks.

=== Rise ===
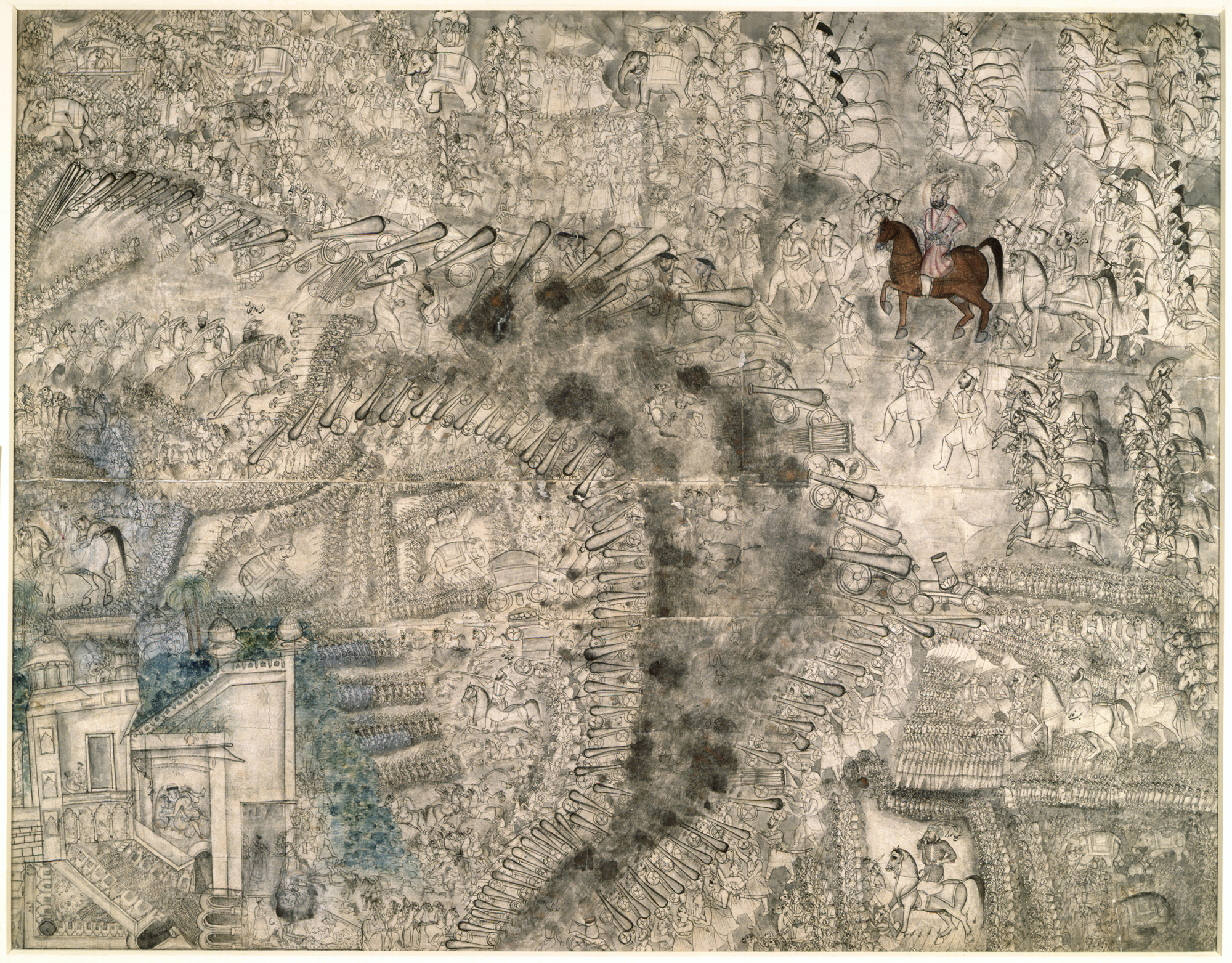
Ahmad Shah Durrani and his coalition decisively defeat the Maratha Confederacy, during the Third Battle of Panipat and restore the Mughal Empire to Shah Alam II.

The Mughal power in northern India had been declining since the reign of Aurangzeb, who died in 1707; In 1751–52, Ahamdiya treaty was signed between the Marathas and Mughals, when Balaji Bajirao was the Peshwa. Through this treaty, the Marathas controlled virtually the whole of India from their capital at Pune and Mughal rule was restricted only to Delhi (the Mughals remained the nominal heads of Delhi). Marathas were now straining to expand their area of control towards the northwest of India. Ahmad Shah sacked the Mughal capital and withdrew with the booty he coveted. To counter the Afghans, Peshwa Balaji Bajirao sent Raghunathrao. He defeated the Rohillas and Afghan garrisons in Punjab and succeeded in ousting Timur Shah and his court from India and brought Lahore, Multan, Kashmir and other subahs on the Indian side of Attock under Maratha rule.

Ahmad Shah Abdali declared a war against the Marathas, and warriors from various Pashtun tribes and 25,000 Baloch warriors joined his army under the command of Khan of Kalat Mir Noori Naseer Khan Baloch. Early skirmishes were followed by victory for the Afghans and Baloch against the smaller Maratha garrisons in Northwest India and by 1759 Ahmad and his army had reached Lahore and were poised to confront the Marathas. By 1760, the Maratha groups had coalesced into a big enough army under the command of Sadashivrao Bhau. Once again, Panipat was the scene of a confrontation between two warring contenders for control of northern India. The Third Battle of Panipat (January 1761), fought between largely Muslim and largely Hindu armies was waged along a twelve-kilometre front. Despite decisively defeating the Marathas, what might have been Ahmad Shah's peaceful control of his domains was disrupted by many challenges. As far as losses are concerned, Afghans too suffered heavily in the Third Battle of Panipat. This weakened his grasp over Punjab which fell to the rising Sikh misls. There were rebellions in the north in the region of Bukhara.

The victory at Panipat was the high point of Ahmad Shah. The Durrani was the second largest Islamic empire in the world, behind the Ottoman Empire at that time. However, even prior to his death, the empire began to unravel. In 1762, Ahmad Shah crossed the passes from Afghanistan for the sixth time to subdue the Sikhs. He assaulted Lahore and, after taking their holy city of Amritsar, massacred thousands of Sikh inhabitants, destroying their revered Golden Temple. Within two years, the Sikhs rebelled again and rebuilt their holy city of Amritsar. Ahmad Shah tried several more times to subjugate the Sikhs permanently, but failed.

In early 1771, ten years after the collapse of Maratha supremacy in north India in the Third Battle of Panipat, Marathas under Mahadji Shinde recaptured Delhi and restored the Mughal Emperor Shah Alam II to the throne in 1772. Ahmad Shah also faced other rebellions in the north, and eventually he and the Uzbek Emir of Bukhara agreed that the Amu Darya would mark the division of their lands. Ahmad Shah retired to his home in the mountains east of Kandahar, where he died on 14 April 1773. He had succeeded to a remarkable degree in balancing tribal alliances and hostilities, and in directing tribal energies away from rebellion. He earned recognition as Ahmad Shah Baba, or "Father of Afghanistan."

By the time of Ahmad Shah's ascendancy, the Pashtuns included many groups whose origins were obscure; They had in common, however, their Pashto language. To the east, the Waziris and their close relatives, the Maseed, had lived in the hills of the central Sulaiman Mountains since the 14th century. By the end of the 16th century and the final Mughal invasions, tribes such as the Shinwari, Yusufzai, and Mohmand had moved from the upper Kabul River Valley into the valleys and plains west, north, and northeast of Peshawar. The Afridi had long been established in the hills and mountain ranges south of the Khyber Pass. By the end of the 18th century, the Durranis had blanketed the area west and north of Kandahar Province.

== List of rulers ==
Name of Amir	Reign	Notes
Ahmad Shah Durrani	1747–1772	Born as Ahmad Khan c. 1722 to Zaman Khan Abdali, who was Governor of Herat Province and chief of the Abdali. During the war between Safavids and the Afghans, his father and grandfather were both killed in a battle, and the young Ahmad Khan fled south to take refuge in Kandahar with the Ghiljis. During his teenage years, Ahmad Khan and his elder brother, Zulfikar Khan, were imprisoned by Hussain Hotaki, the last Ghilji ruler of the Hotaki dynasty. In 1738, during the Siege of Kandahar, Ahmad Khan was released by Nader Shah of Khorasan and made to lead 4,000 Abdali soldiers. This was due to Ahmad Khan's family background and the fact that he and Nader Shah were both from the historical Khorasan region.
Sulayman Mirza	1772	Following the death of Sulayman's father, Ahmad Shah Durrani, the empire faced a period of succession crisis between himself and his brother, Timur Shah Durrani. Sulayman Mirza was later defeated in 1772, allowing for Timur Shah to be crowned in November 1772.
Timur Shah Durrani	November 1772 – 1793	Timur Shah spent most of his reign fighting off civil war and consolidating the territories that were chipping away from the empire such as the Punjab. He reestablished rule in Multan and halted Bukharan expansion into northern Afghanistan. Upon his death in 1793, he had 23 sons, leading to a succession crisis.
Zaman Shah Durrani	1793–1801	After the death of Timur Shah, three of his sons, the governors of Kandahar Humayun (not to be confused with the brother of Timur Shah), Herat (Mahmud Shah Durrani), and Kabul (Zaman Shah Durrani), contended for the succession. Zaman Shah, governor of Kabul, held the field by virtue of being in control of the capital, and became shah at the age of twenty-three. Many of his half-brothers were imprisoned on their arrival in the capital for the purpose, ironically, of electing a new shah. The quarrels among Timur's descendants that threw Afghanistan into turmoil also provided the pretext for the intervention of outside forces. The efforts of the Sadozai heirs of Timur to impose a true monarchy on the truculent Pashtun tribes, and their efforts to rule absolutely and without the advice of the other major Pashtun tribal leaders, were ultimately unsuccessful. The Sikhs became particularly troublesome, and after several unsuccessful efforts to subdue them, Zaman Shah made the mistake of appointing a forceful young Sikh chief, Ranjit Singh, as his governor of Lahore. This "one-eyed" warrior would later become an implacable enemy of Pashtun rulers in Afghanistan. Zaman's downfall was triggered by his attempts to consolidate power. Although it had been through the support of the Barakzai chief, Painda Khan Barakzai, that he had come to the throne, Zaman soon began to remove prominent Barakzai leaders from positions of power and replace them with men of his own lineage, the Sadozai. This upset the delicate balance of Durrani tribal politics that Ahmad Shah had established and may have prompted Painda Khan and other Durrani chiefs to plot against the shah. Painda Khan and the chiefs of the Nurzai and the Alizai Durrani clans were executed, as was the chief of the Qizilbash clan. Painda Khan's son fled to Iran and pledged the substantial support of his Barakzai followers to a rival claimant to the throne, Zaman's older brother, Mahmud Shah. The clans of the chiefs Zaman had executed joined forces with the rebels, and they took Kandahar without bloodshed, they then marched on to Kabul, deposing Zaman Shah.
Mahmud Shah Durrani	1801–1803	Zaman Shah's overthrow in 1801 was not the end of civil strife in Afghanistan, but the beginning of even greater violence. Mahmud Shah's first reign lasted for only two years before he was replaced by Shuja Shah.
Shuja Shah Durrani	1803–1809	Yet another of Timur Shah's sons, Shuja Shah (or Shah Shuja), ruled for only six years. On 7 June 1809, Shuja Shah signed a treaty with the British, which included a clause stating that he would oppose the passage of foreign troops through his territories. This agreement, the first Afghan pact with a European power, stipulated joint action in case of Franco-Persian aggression against Afghan or British dominions. Only a few weeks after signing the agreement, Shuja was deposed by his predecessor, Mahmud. Much later, he was reinstated by the British, ruling during 1839–1842. One of his sons, Fateh Jang, also ruled for a brief period in 1842, following Shah Shuja's assassination.
Mahmud Shah Durrani	1809–1818 (second reign) 1818–1826 (as ruler of Herat)	Mahmud's second reign lasted nine years. Mahmud alienated the Barakzai, especially Fateh Khan, the son of Painda Khan, who was eventually seized and blinded. Revenge would later be sought and obtained by Fateh Khan's youngest brother, Dost Mohammad Khan. Expelled to Herat in 1818, Mahmud Shah ruled that area until his son Kamran deposed and exiled him with Iranian help.
Abbas Mirza Durrani	1810 (Ruler of the Durrani Empire)	Abbas Mirza was placed on the throne of the Durrani empire in 1810 while Shah Mahmood was campaigning in Kashmir, Shah Mahmud had returned and deposed Abbas Mirza after a skirmish at the capital of Kabul.
Ali Shah Durrani	1818–1819	Ali Shah was another son of Timur Shah. He seized power for a brief period in 1818–19.
Ayub Shah Durrani	1819–1823	Ayub Shah was another son of Timur Shah, who deposed Sultan Ali Shah. He was himself later deposed, and presumably killed in 1823. The loss of Kashmir during his reign opened a new chapter in South Asian history.
Shuja Shah Durrani	1839–1842 (second reign)	He was declared as Amir with help and support from the British but was deposed by Akbar Khan in 1842.
Fateh Jang Durrani	April 1842-October 1842 (Ruler of the Durrani Kingdom)	Following Shah Shuja Durrani's death, Fateh Jang's father, Fateh Jang succeeded his father in rule at Kabul, however fled with the British after their punitive expedition to Kabul, leaving in October 1842.
Shahzada Kamran Durrani	1826–1842 (as ruler of Herat)	Expelled his father from Herat in 1826, ruled over Herat until 1842. Iranians invaded in 1833 and 1837, in the aftermath of the Iranian siege of Herat in early 1842 he was deposed and brutally murdered by his vizier Yar Mohammad Khan Alakozai.
Mohammad-Yusuf Mirza Durrani	1855–1856 (as ruler of Herat)	Ruler of Herat 15 September 1855 to 28 April 1856. Overthrew Sa'id Mohammad Khan Alakozai in 1855, Iranian siege of Herat began April 1856. Overthrown by his vizier 'Isa Khan Bardurrani on 28 April 1856, given up to the Iranians.

== Dynasty Family Tree ==
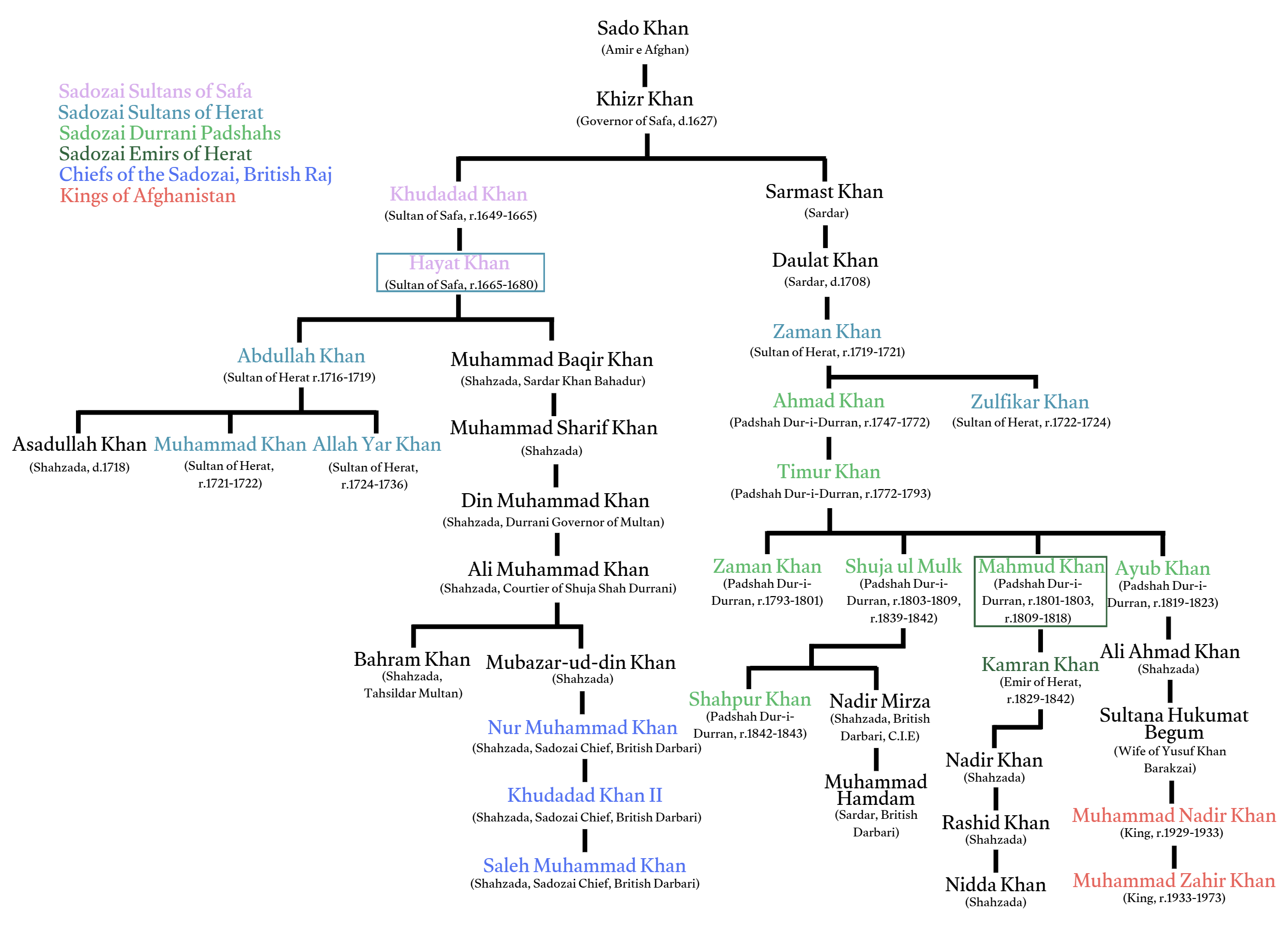
A complete chart showing the different branches of the Sadozai/Durrani Royal Family, including the fate of descendants of the family during the British Raj.

The Sadozai from their progenitor Amir-e-Afghan Sado Khan to the Sadozai Sultanate of Safa, followed by the Sadozai Sultanate of Herat and then the Durrani Empire. Includes branches settled in the British Raj who were officially confirmed with titles and seats.

The last two Kings of Afghanistan maternally descend from the Sadozai/Durrani Dynasty.

Includes a color-coded legend with the following categories:

- Sadozai Sultans of Safa
- Sadozai Sultans of Herat
- Sadozai Durrani Padshahs
- Sadozai Emirs of Herat
- Chiefs of the Sadozai, British Raj
- Kings of Afghanistan

== See also ==
- List of Sunni dynasties
- Barakzai dynasty
- Hotak dynasty
- Sur Empire
- Lodi dynasty
- Khalji dynasty
- Ghurid dynasty
- Ghaznavids
- Saffarid dynasty
