= Ayub Shah Durrani =

Ayub Shah Durrani ایوب شاه دراني
- Shah of the Durrani Empire; King, Pearl of the Pearls (Note: Persian: شاه در دران, romanized: Šāh Durr-i Durrān)
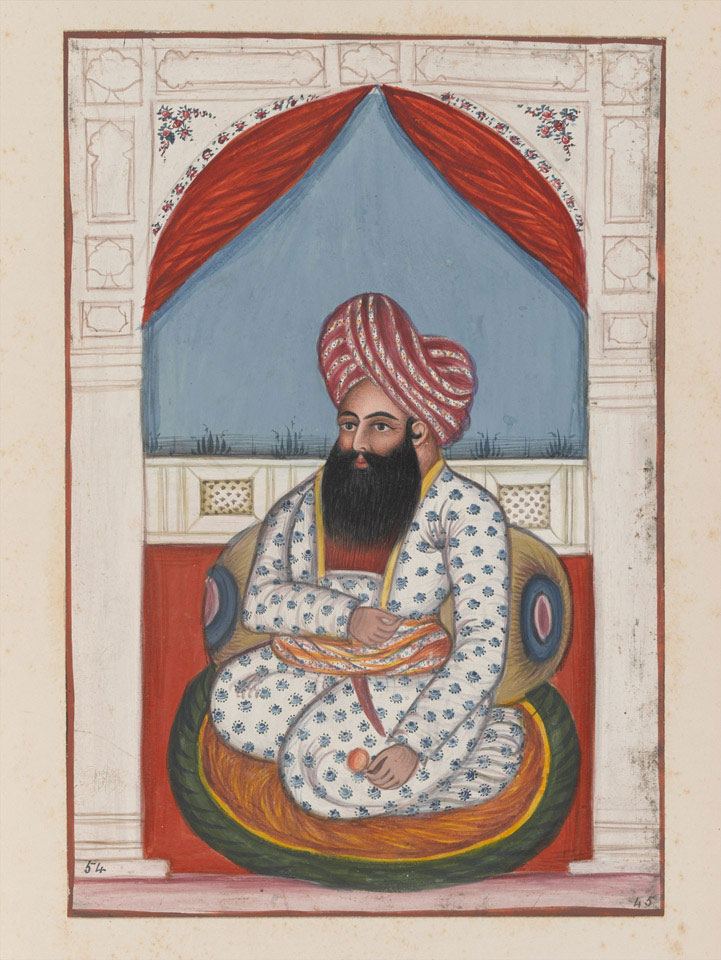
- Ayub Shah Durrani. Watercolour by a Company artist, Punjab, c. 1865

Shah of the Durrani Empire
- Reign: 1819–1823
- Predecessor: Ali Shah Durrani
- Successor: Monarchy abolished (Sultan Mohammad Khan as Sardar of Kabul)
- Died: 1 October 1837
- Dynasty: Durrani
- Father: Timur Shah Durrani
- Religion: Sunni Islam

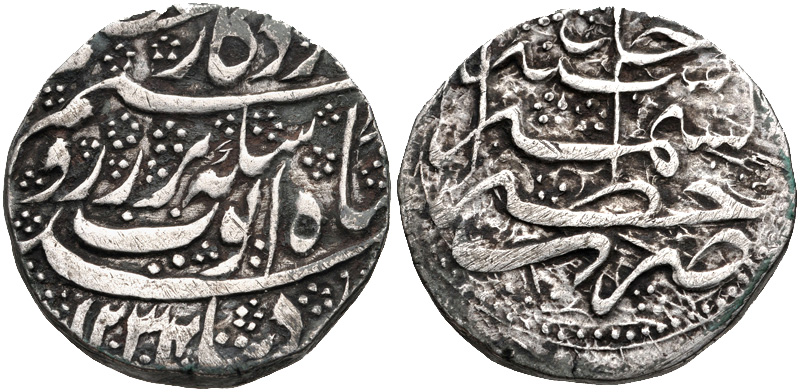
Coin of Ayub Shah Durrani, minted in Kashmir, 1818

Ayub Shah Durrani (Pashto: ايوب شاه دراني; Persian: ایوب شاه درانی), also known as Ayub Shah Abdali, was the ruler of Afghanistan from 1819 to 1823. He was an Afghan from the Pashtun ethnic group, and the second oldest son of Timur Shah. He succeeded his brother Ali Shah Durrani, after his son Isma'il Mirza killed him on the orders of Azim Khan Barakzai. He only ruled for four years, holding off his own brothers, as well as the Barakzai and Indian tribes from nearby. He was imprisoned by the Barakzai dynasty, and was succeeded by Sultan Mohammad Khan. He died in 1837.

== Notes ==
Regnal titles
| Preceded by Ali Shah Durrani | Emir of Afghanistan; 1819–1823 | Succeeded by Dost Mohammad Khan |
