= Ali Shah Durrani =

Sultan Ali Shah Durrani Mirza (King Ali I) علی شاه درانی
- Shah of the Durrani Empire; King, Pearl of the Pearls (Note: Persian: شاه در دران, romanized: Šāh Durr-i Durrān)

Shah of the Durrani Empire
- Reign: September 1818 – December 1818
- Coronation: September 1818
- Predecessor: Mahmud Shah Durrani
- Successor: Ayub Shah Durrani
- Died: December 1818
- Dynasty: Durrani dynasty
- Father: Timur Shah Durrani
- Mother: Zuhra Begum

Ali Shah Durrani (Pashto: علي شاه دراني; Persian: علی شاه درانی), also known as Ali Shah Abdali, was ruler of the Durrani Empire in 1818. He was a son of Timur Shah Durrani, an Afghan from the Pashtun ethnic group and the penultimate Durrani Emperor. He was strangled by his brother Shah Isma'il in December 1818.

== Notes ==
Regnal titles
Preceded by Mahmud Shah	Emir of Afghanistan; 1818–1819	Succeeded by Ayub Shah
