= Mohammad-Yusuf Mirza Durrani =

Ruler of Herat from 1855 to 1856

Ruler of Herat
- Tenure: 15 September 1855 – 28 April 1856
- Predecessor: Sa'id Mohammad Khan Alakozai
- Successor: Isa Khan Bardurrani
- Died: March 1857
- House: Durrani dynasty
- Religion: Sunni Islam

Mohammad-Yusuf Mirza Durrani (Pashto/Persian: محمد یوسف میرزا درانی) was a Durrani prince who briefly controlled Herat from 1855 to 1856. He was a grandson of Firuz al-Din Mirza Durrani, one of its previous rulers.

== Biography ==
A member of the Durrani dynasty, Mohammad-Yusuf Mirza Durrani was a grandson of Firuz al-Din Mirza Durrani, one of the previous rulers of Herat. The area was a frontier vassalage barely under the control of Qajar Iran, an uncertainty which influenced many developments in the early 19th century. In 1842, Mohammad-Yusuf Mirza's uncle Kamran Mirza Durrani—who at the time ruled Herat—was killed by his vizier Yar Muhammad Khan Alakozai, who then assumed control over Herat. After his death, he was succeeded by his son Sa'id Mohammad Khan Alakozai.

Since 1844, Mohammad-Yusuf had been living in Iran, where he was mentored by the Qajar dynasty. Later under the administration of the Qajar prince Fereydun Mirza, Mohammad-Yusuf Mirza held the governorship of Torbat-e Jam. On 15 September 1855, without requesting Iranian approval or assistance, Mohammad-Yusuf Mirza overthrew Sa'id Mohammad Khan and made himself the new ruler of Herat. Around the same time, in southern and western Afghanistan, the power of the Mohammadzai tribe was increasing. The Mohammadzai ruler Dost Mohammad Khan had on 18 March 1855 signed the Treaty of Peshawar with Britain, which acknowledged him as ruler of all of Afghanistan. Part of the purpose of this deal was to prevent Iranian plans for Herat. Now fully supported by the British, Dost Mohammad Khan announced his plan to march on Herat under the guise of wanting to avenge Sa'id Mohammad Khan, who was his son-in-law.

On 11 December 1855, Mohammad-Yusuf Mirza's request for help reached the Iranian government. According to the Iranologist Christine Noelle-Karimi; "The swift reaction of the Iranian government... suggests the possibility that preparations for a move against Herat had already been under way." The newspapers in Tehran reported on the deployment of Iranian troops to Herat on 20 December 1855. An army under Sam Khan Ilkhani Zafaranlu was sent in advance to Herat in February 1856, but it was quickly ousted by the Afghan authorities, who also almost succeeded in overthrowing Mohammad-Yusuf Mirza. Mohammad-Yusuf Mirza subsequently defected to the British side due to lacking confidence in the Iranian government.

At the start of April 1856, the Iranian general Morad Mirza Hesam o-Saltaneh besieged Herat with 30,000 troops. In an attempt to make the siege easier, he tried to create division among the factions in Herat. However, this made the situation even more difficult. Morad Mirza made a deal with Mohammad-Yusuf Mirza's vizier Isa Khan Bardurrani to betray him, while simultaneously being in peace talks with Mohammad-Yusuf Mirza. On 28 April 1856, Morad Mirza received Mohammad-Yusuf Mirza through the efforts of Isa Khan. However, the latter showed no willingness to give up control of Herat and who expected autonomy as part of the agreement, leading to Morad Mirza to increase the pressure on the city.

Mohammad-Yusuf Mirza was then taken to Tehran, and later got killed by Sa'id Mohammad Khan's family members in March 1857.

== Sources ==
- Amanat, Abbas (2003). "Herat vi. The Herat question". In Yarshater, Ehsan (ed.). Encyclopædia Iranica. Vol. XII/2: Hedāyat al-mota'allemin–Herat VII. London and New York: Routledge & Kegan Paul. pp. 219–224. ISBN 978-0-933273-75-7.
- Noelle-Karimi, Christine (2014). The Pearl in its Midst: Herat and the Mapping of Khurasan (15th-19th Centuries). Austrian Academy of Sciences. ISBN 978-3700172024.
