= Shahpur Shah Durrani =

Shah of the Durrani Empire

Shahpur Shah Durrani شاهپور شاه دراني
- His Majesty, Grace of God, King Sultan Shahpur the Brave, Abdali, Pearl of the Pearls, King of Afghanistan (Note: Persian: اعلی حضرت عنایت الهی پادشاه سلطان شاهپور بهادر ابدالی در دران پادشاه افغانستان, romanized: A'lā Hazrat Ināyat-i Ilāhī Pādishāh Sultān Shāhpūr Bahādur Abdālī Durr-i Durrān, Pādishāh-i Afghānistān)
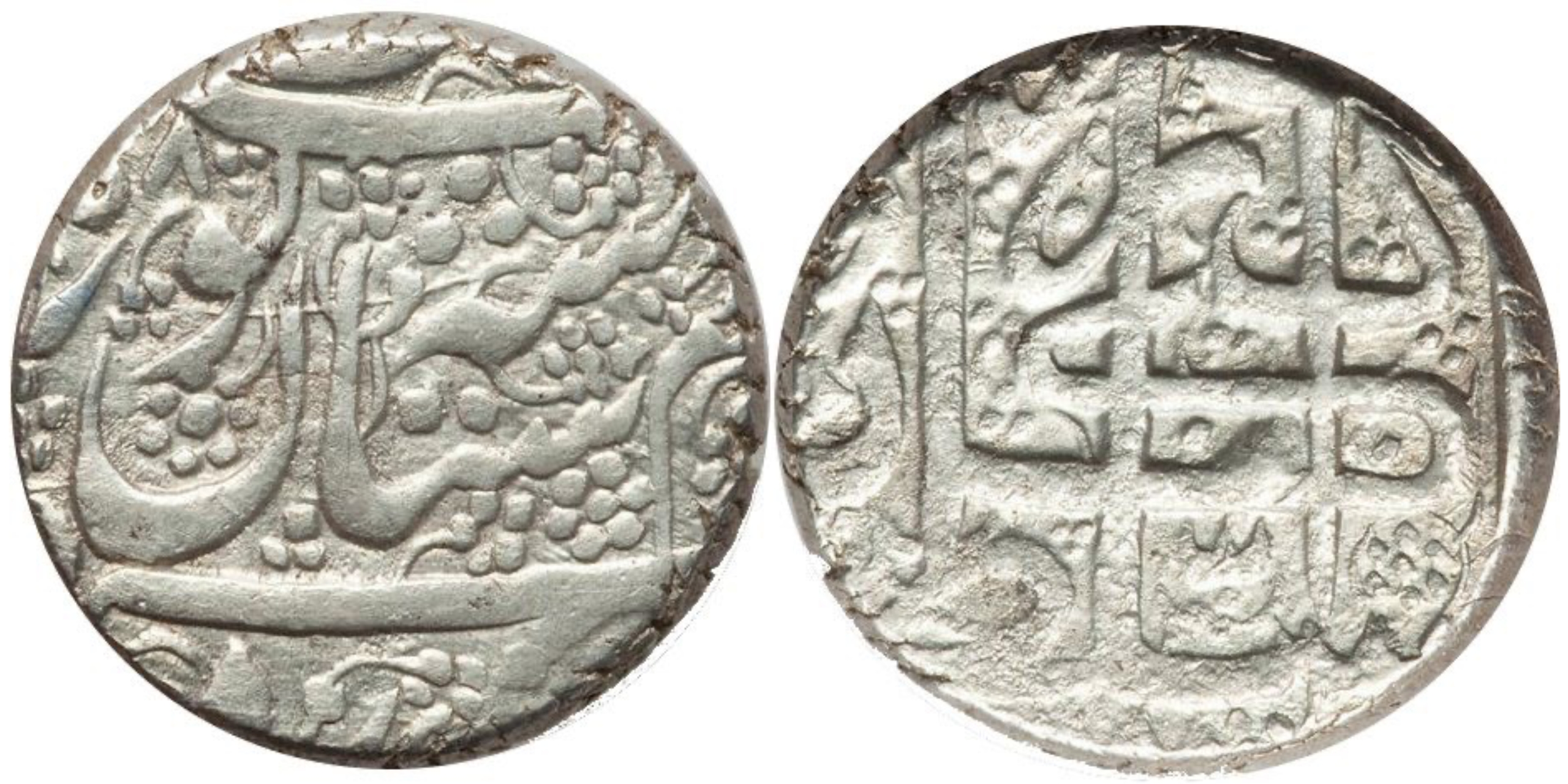
- Coin of Shahpur Shah Durrani, minted in Kabul, dated 1842

Shah of the Durrani Kingdom
- Reign: 12 October 1842 – April 1843
- Predecessor: Fateh Jang Durrani
- Successor: Monarchy abolished (Dost Mohammad Khan as Emir of Kabul)
- Died: 1884; Peshawar, British Raj
- Spouse: Unknown
- Issue: Alamgir Mirza
- House: Durrani
- Father: Shuja Shah Durrani
- Mother: Wafa Begum
- Religion: Sunni Islam
- Military career
- Conflicts: First Anglo-Afghan War (surrendered)

Shahpur Shah Durrani, (Note: Pashto: شاهپور شاه دراني, romanized: Šāhpur Šāh Durrāni [ʃɑ(h).puɾ ʃɑ(h) d̪u(ɾ).ɾɑ.ni]; Persian: شاهپور شاه درانی, romanized: Shāhpūr Shāh Durrānī [ʃɑː(ʱ).pʰúːɾ ʃɑː(ʱ) d̪ʊɾ.ɾɑːˈníː]) (died 1884) also known as Prince Shahpur, was briefly the ruler of Afghanistan following the abdication of his full brother, Fateh Jang Durrani. Shahpur declared himself king, but soon chose to surrender, and be succeeded by Wazir Akbar Khan. Shahpur fled to Ludhiana, and died in Peshawar.

== Early life ==
Shahpur was born to Shuja Shah Durrani, the former King of Afghanistan, and to Wafa Begum. He was the favorite son of Shuja Shah, and the governor of Kabul.

After his father's death, he rushed to the Bala Hissar to protect the women and children of the royal family, while ignoring his father's dead corpse that had been left untouched for 24 hours.

== Reign ==
Shahpur ruled for less than a month before being expelled by his own nobles at the request of Wazir Akbar Khan.
