= Siege of Nishapur (1755) =

Part of the Durrani Campaign to Khorasan

- Part of Durrani Campaign to Khorasan (1754–55)
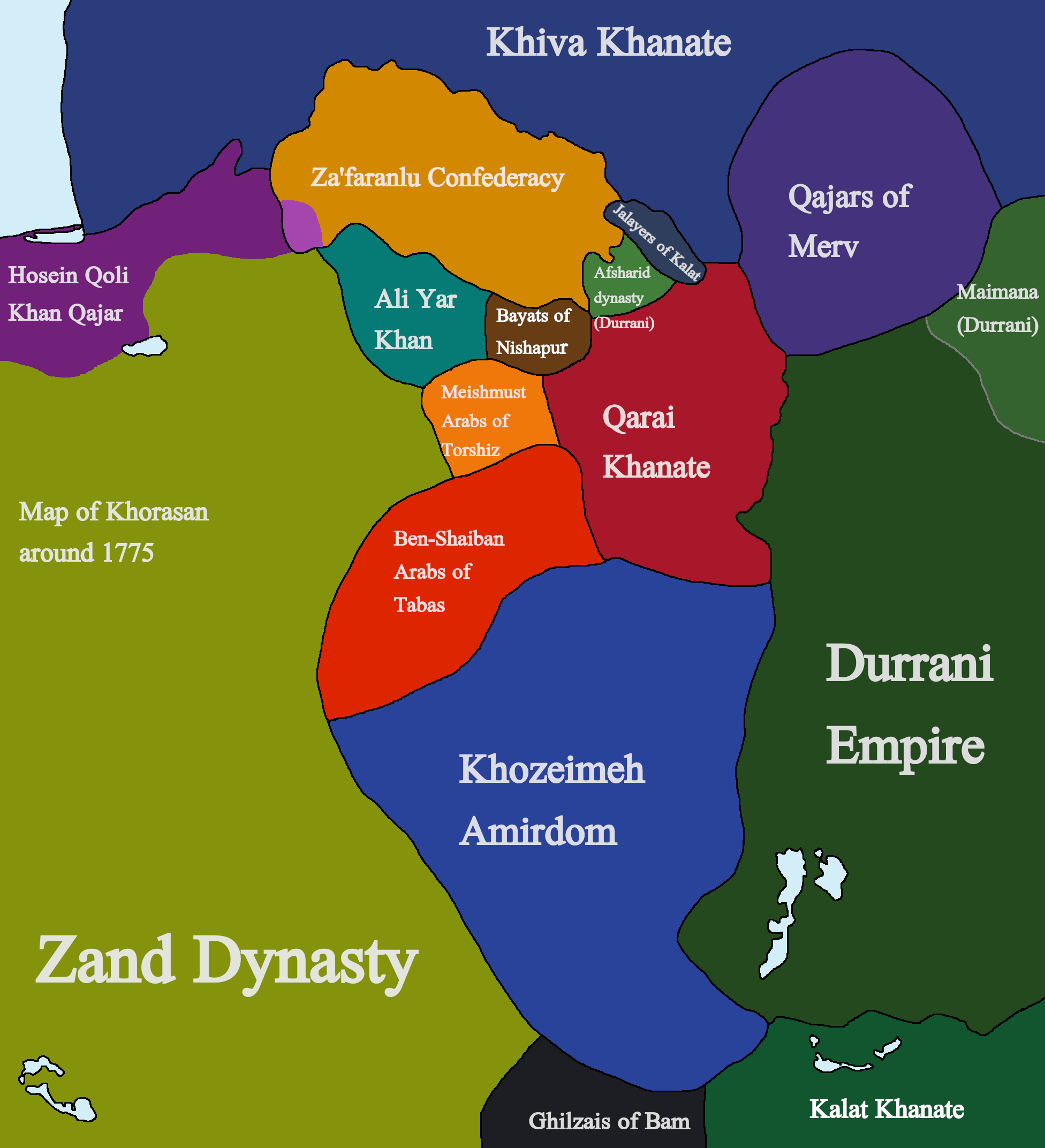
- Map of Khorasan in 1775
Date	17 June – 24 June 1755
Location	Nishapur, Qara Bayat Amirdom, (modern day Iran)
Result	Durrani victory
Territorial changes	Nishapur brought under Durrani suzerainty

Belligerents
Durrani Empire	Qara Bayat Amirdom (Khanate of Nishapur)

Commanders and leaders
Ahmad Shah Durrani	Abbas Qoli Khan (surrendered) (POW)

The siege of Nishapur began in 1755 when Ahmad Shah Durrani, ruler of the Durrani Empire, invaded Khorasan. Having earlier brought Mashhad to submission, Ahmad Shah laid siege to the capital of Qara Bayat Amirdom in the spring of 1755.

Having failed in his first attempt to take the city, Ahmad Shah arrived before the city, intent on seizing it. Abbas Qoli Khan, ruler of the Qara Bayat Amirdom, immediately surrendered. However, after news of a possible Afghan general's defeat, he revolted. As a result, a one week siege ensued where Afghan forces barraged the city with cannons.

The resulting losses forced the cities inhabitants to open the gates of the city, where Afghan forces stormed the city, plundering and razing much of it. Abbas Qoli Khan was taken by Ahmad Shah as captive to Kabul where he earned his favor, eventually returning to rule under his suzerainty.

== Background ==
In 1750–1751, Ahmad Shah invaded Khorasan in his first campaign. However he failed to overcome the defenses of Nishapur, retreating in the winter of 1751, facing heavy casualties. Ahmad Shah began preparing for a second campaign beginning in 1754. During this time, Nishapur was besieged by Alam Khan, a former Afsharid viceroy. Upon hearing that Ahmad Shah began his campaign to Khorasan, Alam Khan's army completely dispersed, while the Camesgazak Kurds completely defected to Ahmad Shah and his army.

Ahmad Shah began his campaign in May 1754. Afghan forces departed from Herat and made for Tun. Sardar Jahan Khan and Nasir Khan of Kalat were further dispatched to devastate the countryside. Following this, they marched against the governor of Tabas, Ali Murad Khan, and battled against him in what Singh describes as one of the most bloodiest battles in Persian history. The battle remained indecisive until Ali Murad Khan was killed and the Persian army was routed.

With their opposition defeated, Tabas and Tun were conquered in between June—July 1754 by the Afghans. The Afghan armies continued their march unto Mashhad, arriving and besieging the city on 23 July. The siege protracted until the Afsharids submitted to Ahmad Shah on 1 December 1754. On the 4th, Ahmad Shah's name was read in the sermon, acknowledging his suzerainty over the Afsharids.

With their victory, the territories of Torshiz, Bakharz, Jam, Khaf, and Turbat-e Haidari were annexed by the Durranis. Following his victory over the Afsharids, Ahmad Shah began his march on Nishapur in the spring of 1755.

== Siege ==
On 17 June 1755, Ahmad Shah had arrived at Nishapur, immediately triggering Abbas Qoli Khan's surrender, seeking to be pardoned for resisting Ahmad Shah in his first campaign to Khorasan. Not long after, however, Abbas Qoli Khan rebelled due to news that Shah Pasand Khan had possibly been defeated by the Qajars.

As a result, the gates of the city were closed on Ahmad Shah's troops. Upon reaching Nishapur, the city was quickly encircled and a full-scale siege commenced. For the first month, Durrani engineers focused on constructing a large artillery piece using the metal carried by the soldiers. This gun, once completed and mounted, was capable of firing projectiles weighing around six Indian maunds roughly 472 pounds in English measure.

This began a one-week siege. During the siege, Ahmad Shah lacked important siege equipment, and as a result, every mounted soldier carried many kilograms of gunmetals. As the siege began, Armenian cannon makers melted down the metal the soldiers carried, and forged a large cannon. The first shot of the cannon blasted through the city walls, and even caused havoc in the city through houses and bazaars.

The weapon forced the submission of the cities elders, and they opened the gates despite Abbas Qoli Khan's opposition. The city was then subsequently plundered, with the populace of the city spared if they went to mosques and didn't take anything with them. Afghan forces went to houses and then began tearing down the defenses of the city, with a large part of the city being entirely razed.

On its first discharge, the massive gun caused widespread destruction, smashing through multiple homes and reducing large portions of the city to rubble. Although the weapon malfunctioned and exploded shortly after, the psychological impact on the inhabitants was immense. Believing themselves defenseless against continued bombardment, several city notables approached the Afghan camp to negotiate terms of surrender.

However, Abbas Quli Khan, the city's military commander and hero of the previous campaign, refused to recognize these negotiations. As the Afghans attempted to enter the city peacefully, he launched a surprise attack, but was repelled with significant losses. Unable to continue resistance, Abbas Quli Khan personally approached Ahmad Shah to plead for mercy. The Afghan ruler detained him as a prisoner of war, treating him with courtesy and later escorting him to Qandahar after the campaign concluded.

== Sack ==
Ahmad Shah Durrani's anger toward the people of Nishapur remained unabated. Through his vizier, Shah Wali Khan, Abbas Quli Khan offered to surrender the fortress under the condition that the population would be spared. The Shah consented to spare their lives, but only if every resident entered the city's central mosque Jame Masjid without carrying any possessions whatsoever. Anyone discovered with even the smallest item, such as a sewing needle, risked execution by Afghan religious warriors.

Driven by fear and desperation, the population complied, gathering in the mosque weeping and wailing. Once the city was vacated, Durrani forces began systematic looting. Every house was ransacked and most structures apart from the mosque were reduced to ruins. Excavations were even conducted beneath buildings to uncover hidden wealth. The once-prosperous city was devastated; water flooded its ditches and ruins, and streets lay buried in rubble.

Numerous civilians were slaughtered, and many women and children were taken away as captives. The once-beautiful city of Nishapur was left desolate, a grim example of the consequences of resisting Ahmad Shah's will.

== Aftermath ==
Ahmad Shah dragged Abbas Qoli Khan to Kabul, but he gained the favour of the Afghan. Ahmad Shah married Abbas's sister and Ahmad Shah's daughter was given to his son. Eventually, Abbas Qoli Khan returned to Nishapur and, according to Malcolm: "devoted the remainder of his life to improving that town, and the districts dependent upon it". For the rest of his reign, Abbas Qoli Khan saw no major political developments except in 1768–69, when Nasrullah Mirza Afshar, a son of Shahrokh Shah, had seized control of Mashhad from his brother, Nader Mirza Afshar. He then besieged Nishapur because Abbas Qoli Khan refused to submit. However, Nader Mirza Afshar used this opportunity to besiege Mashhad. As a result, Nasrullah Mirza abandoned the siege of Nishapur and raced back to Mashhad and expelled Nader Mirza.
