= Revolt of Fayz Allah Khan =

Failed revolt in the Durrani Empire (c. 1775)

Date	January 1775
Location	Bala Hissar, Peshawar, Durrani Empire
Result	Durrani victory

Belligerents
Durrani Empire	Rebels

Commanders and leaders
Timur Shah Durrani	Fayz Allah Khan (executed); Yaqut Khan (executed); Asad Allah Khan

Strength
Unknown	20,000–25,000

Casualties and losses
Unknown	6,000 killed

The Revolt of Fayz Allah Khan was a failed insurrection and assassination attempt against Timur Shah Durrani, ruler of the Durrani Empire, which occurred in Peshawar in January of 1775. The revolt was led by Fayz Allah Khan Khalil, a prominent zamindar and tribal leader, who sought to overthrow Timur Shah by exploiting fears of Sikh expansion in Punjab and mobilizing tribal support. The conspiracy was discovered and violently suppressed, resulting in the deaths of thousands and the execution of Fayz Allah Khan Khalil. The revolt contributed to Timur Shah's decision to strengthen central authority and permanently transfer the imperial capital from Kandahar to Kabul.

== Background ==
Fayz Allah Khan Khalil was a leading zamindar in the Peshawar region and a figure to whom rural communities frequently turned for leadership and counsel. He belonged to the Khalil tribe, a large Afghan tribe residing around Peshawar and traditionally linked by lineage to the Durrani ruling elite. His influence among local tribes and landholders made him a significant regional power.

During the reign of Timur Shah Durrani, tensions persisted within the empire due to administrative centralization, tribal rivalries, and military pressures along the Indian frontier. Sikh forces were increasingly active in Punjab, creating widespread anxiety among Afghan officials and Muslim communities. Fayz Allah Khan exploited these concerns as a pretext to gather armed followers.

== Conspiracy ==
Fayz Allah Khan Khalil, together with several sardars, plotted to assassinate Timur Shah in hopes of seizing power. Among his principal collaborators was Yaqut Khan, a eunuch who headed the royal harem guards and enjoyed the shah's trust. Another associate was Asad Allah Khan Mohmand also known as Arsalan Khan, a leading zamindar of Peshawar.

The conspirators sent a message to Timur Shah claiming that Sikh forces were harassing Muslims in Punjab and requested permission to mobilize tribal levies to suppress them. Unaware of the conspirators intentions, Timur Shah approved the request. Fayz Allah Khan then assembled a large force drawn from Peshawar and Kashmir, numbering between 20,000 and 25,000 infantry and cavalry men. Asad Allah khan has his own force of 2,500 tribesmen

== Attempted assassination at the Bala Hissar ==
While Timur Shah was residing at the Bala Hissar in Peshawar, the conspirators chose an afternoon moment when the shah was resting. Claiming that the shah had summoned them for a troop review, Fayz Allah Khan and his followers attempted to enter the citadel. When palace guards refused entry, the rebels forced their way in, killing guards and wounding several officials in the royal kitchen. Timur Shah was alerted to the danger and fled to the top of a tower within the citadel. Loyal guards including ghulams, Qizilbash troops, and other palace units were ordered to suppress the uprising. Heavy fighting followed within and around the Bala Hissar.

== Suppression and massacre ==
The imperial forces decisively defeated the rebels, driving them several kilometers from the city. Contemporary sources report extensive bloodshed, with approximately 6,000 people killed, including rebels and civilians who were mistaken for insurgents due to similar dress. Fayz Allah Khan Khalil and his son were captured and executed. Yaqut Khan was also arrested and put to death for his role in facilitating the conspiracy. Several villages associated with suspected rebels were raided, though the violence was later curtailed through the intercession of local sardars. Asad Allah Khan Mohmand managed to escape into the mountainous regions of Bajaur.

== Capture and execution of Fayz Allah Khan ==
According to later accounts, Fayz Allah Khan initially evaded capture by fleeing into the hills of Hashtnagar. Timur Shah, unable to secure him by force, employed deception by publicly declaring that Fayz Allah Khan had been forgiven. A letter of pardon, written and sealed on a leaf of the Quran, was sent to him. Trusting the sanctity of the document, Fayz Allah Khan traveled to Kabul to express repentance. Upon arrival, he was arrested and beheaded on the same day.

== Aftermath ==
Following the suppression of the revolt, Timur Shah returned to Kabul and formally established it as the imperial capital in place of Kandahar. This decision was influenced by Kabul's central position within Afghan territory and the presence of the Qizilbash administrators whom Timur Shah favored.
