= Afghan succession crisis of 1772 =

1772 succession conflict in the Duranni Empire

| Date | 16 October 1772 – November 1772 |
| Location | Durrani Empire (Afghanistan) |
| Result | Loyalist victory |

Belligerents
| Loyalists; Timur Mirza | Opposition; Sulaiman Mirza |

Commanders and leaders
| Timur Mirza Durrani; Supported by: Ahmad Shah Durrani # | Sulaiman Mirza Durrani (surrendered); Begi Khan Bamizai (executed); Sardar Jahan Khan (executed); Yaqut Khan (executed); Darwish Ali Khan (executed) |

A succession crisis in the Durrani Empire took place in 1772 between Ahmad Shah Durrani's eldest son, Sulaiman Mirza Durrani, and second eldest son, Timur Mirza Durrani.

== Background ==
Prior to his death, Ahmad Shah announced that his son, Timur Mirza, would inherit the empire. This was controversial in the court, as many powerul military and tribal leaders had supported Ahmad Shah's elder son, Sulaiman Mirza, attempted to convince Ahmad Shah to change his mind. However, Ahmad Shah said he felt that Sulaiman was violent, unpopular with the Durranis of Kandahar, and would be an inferior leader. Timur's appointment would also possibly limit the power held by Senior Generals and the Durrani Tribal Council. Timur was in Herat, however far from his ailing father; Begi Khan Bamizai and Sardar Jahan Khan used this opportunity to turn Ahmad Shah against his son. When Timur came to see his father, he turned him away. Recognizing that a conflict with his brother was imminent, Timur began building his forces, in this task he was interrupted by Darwish Ali Khan's revolt, a Beg of the Sunni Hazaras, an action was that possibly orchestrated by those loyal to Sulaiman. Timur promised Darwish Ali pardon and power, then executed him after he arrived in Herat.

Upon Ahmad Shah's death in 1772, Shah Wali Khan and Sardar Jahan Khan pretended that the Shah was not dead, merely ill, and was being kept separate from all but the most trusted officials. They began a march, with his body, to the capital, Kandahar; upon arriving, they told Sulaiman of his father's death and declared Sulaiman was to be king. Timur received word of this from Amirs who had turned against Shah Wali, and he too went to Kandahar. The two sides met at Farah, where Shah Wali and his sons were assassinated. Sulaiman Mirza surrendered to Timur Mirza and became loyal, according to Amir Habibullah Khan, but fled to India, according to Lee. Timur Mirza ascended the throne in November 1772, and assumed the title Shah, thus he was called Timur Shah. Later during the reign of Timur, his brother Sikander would become the main focus of a conspiracy to succeed to the Durrani throne after a plot on Timur's life that nearly succeeded in Peshawar.

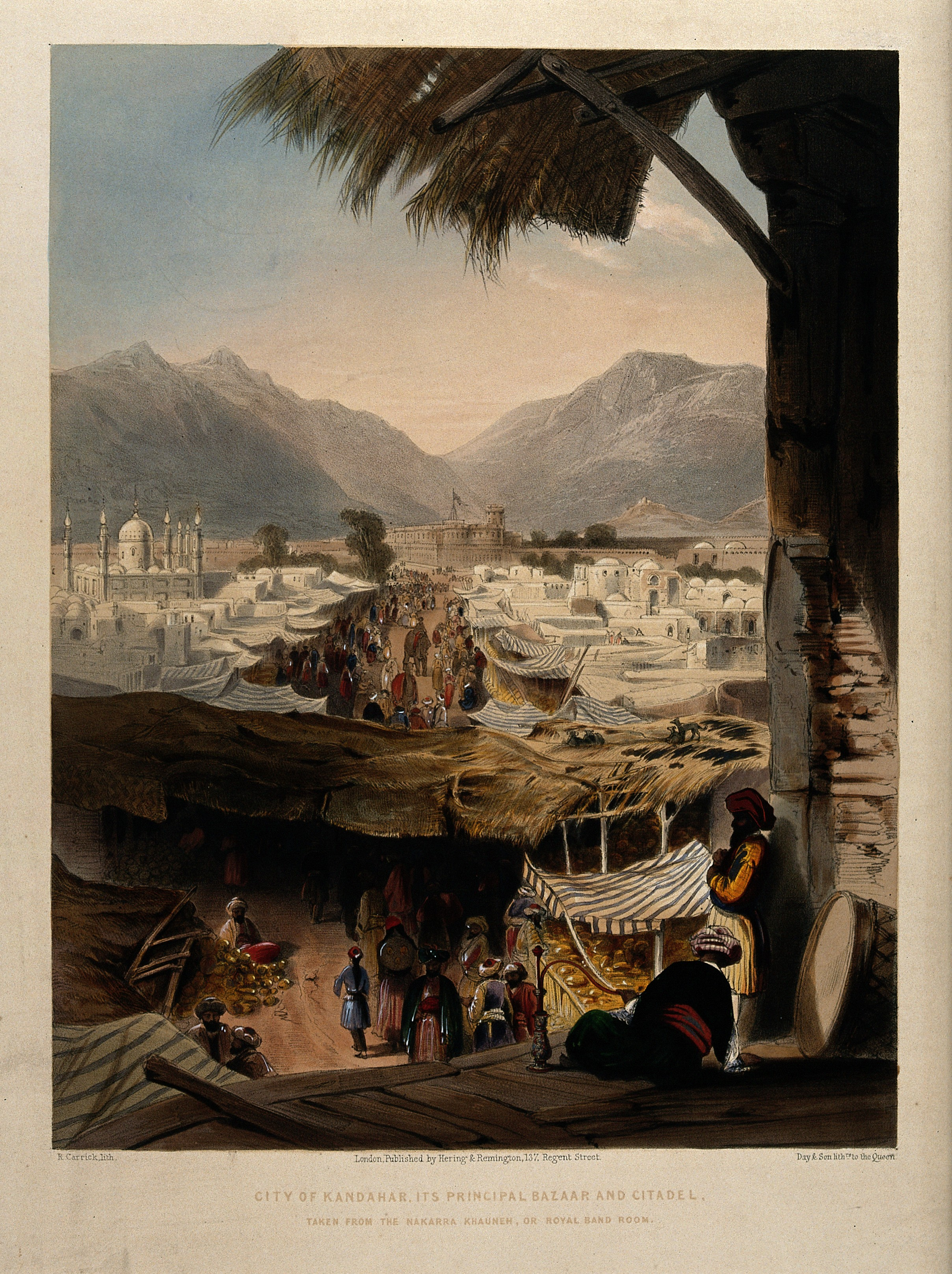
City of Kandahar, its principal bazaar and citadel, as seen from the Nakkara Khauna

== Citations ==
- Lee, Jonathan L. (2022). Afghanistan: A History from 1260 to the Present. Reaktion Books.
- Singh, Ganda (1959). Ahmad shah durrani, father of modern Afghanistan. Asia Publishing House – via Internet Archive.
