= Battle of Turbat-i-Shaikh Jam =

1750 conflict between the Durrani and Afsharid empires

- Part of Durrani Campaign to Khorasan (1749–51)
Date	1750
Location	Torbat-e Jam, Khorasan 35.2431°N 60.6248°E
Result	Durrani victory

Belligerents
Durrani Empire; Khanate of Kalat	Afsharids

Commanders and leaders
Ahmad Shah Durrani; Sardar Jahan Khan; Mir Nasir Khan I	Mir Alam Khan †

Strength
8,000 vanguard	Unknown

Casualties and losses
Light	Heavy

The Turbat-i-Shaikh Jam was fought in 1750 between the forces of the Durrani Empire under Ahmad Shah Durrani and the Persian faction led by Mir Alam Khan, who had taken control of Mashhad during the period of instability in Khorasan following the decline of the Afsharid dynasty. The engagement resulted in a decisive Afghan victory, the death of Mir Alam Khan, and the subsequent capture of key strongholds in the region, including the fortress of Nun.

== Background ==
Following the capture of Herat by Ahmad Shah Durrani in his second campaign into Khorasan, the Shah turned his attention towards Mashhad and Nishapur. At this time, Mashhad was in a state of political turmoil. Shah Rukh, the blinded grandson of Nader Shah, was a nominal ruler with little authority. His general, Yusuf Ali, had been overpowered and blinded by Mir Alam Khan, who emerged as the de facto master of Mashhad.

Mir Alam Khan had begun preparations for a campaign against Nishapur when he received news of Herat's fall and Ahmad Shah's advance. He quickly abandoned the Nishapur operation, fortified Mashhad, and marched out to confront the Afghans.

== Battle ==
Ahmad Shah dispatched an advance force of around 5,000 chosen troops under Jahan Khan Popalzai, supported by Mir Nasir Khan of Kalat with 3,000 Baloch horsemen. The vanguard encountered Mir Alam Khan near Turbat-i-Shaikh Jam.

The Afghans initially surprised their opponent, but Mir Alam quickly rallied his men and counterattacked, pushing back Jahan Khan's force. The tide of battle turned, however, when Mir Nasir Khan led a bold cavalry charge that broke the Persian lines. Mir Alam Khan was killed in the fighting, and his army collapsed in disorder.

== Aftermath ==
With the death of Mir Alam Khan, Ahmad Shah's main force advanced toward Mashhad. The fortress of Nun, commanded by Mir Masum Khan, Mir Alam's brother, was the next obstacle. Despite strengthening his defenses, Masum Khan lost hope upon learning of his brother's death. He surrendered the fort after a brief siege, personally delivering the keys to Ahmad Shah. The victory secured Durrani control over Mashhad and much of Khorasan, further consolidating Ahmad Shah's authority in the region and weakening the already fragmented Afsharid state.
