= Jahan Khan (Afghan general) =

Durrani commander-in-chief (18th century)

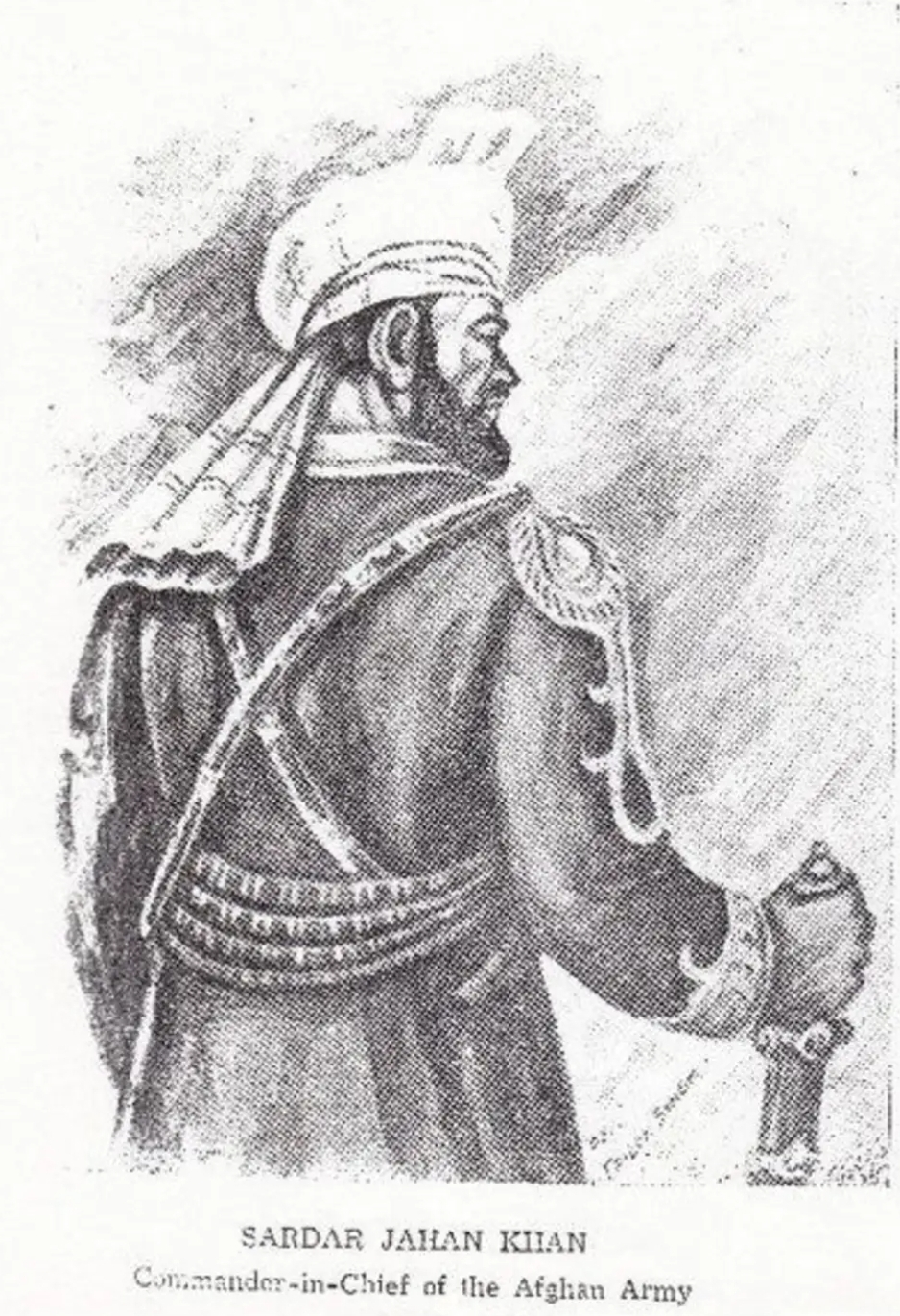
- Died: 14 March 1770; Durrani Empire (Unknown modern-day location)
- Cause of death: Colic attack
- Military career
- Allegiance: Durrani Empire
- Rank: Sipah-Salar
- Conflicts: Mughal–Afghan Wars: Battle of Lahore; Battle of Manupur; Sack of Delhi (1757); Indian campaign of Ahmad Shah Durrani: Battle of Chaumuhan; Battle of Gokul; Sack of Mathura; Sack of Vrindavan; Sack of Agra; Afghan–Maratha War: Battle of Narela; Battle of Taraori; Battle of Sikandarabad; Battle of Panipat; Afghan–Sikh Wars: Battle of Amritsar; Battle of Kup; Battle of Sialkot; Battle of Jalandhar Doab (1765); Battle of Sutlej (1765); Battle of Meerut (1767); Persian–Afghan Wars: Siege of Mashhad; Battle of Torbat-e Jam; Battle of Kakhk; Afghan succession crisis of 1772 (executed)

Sardar Jahan Khan (Pashto: سردار جهان خان), better known simply as Jahan Khan (جهان خان) was an Afghan war minister and commander-in-chief (Sipah-Salar) under Ahmad Shah Abdali.

In 1747, Ahmad Shah Durrani formed the Durrani Empire after he was elected as Afghan king in Kandahar by local chiefs. Sardar Jahan Khan was appointed as the army general in chief and honoured with the title of Mir Bazan and Khān-i-Khānān.

Jahan Khan partook in the various Durrani campaigns in Khorasan and in India, including the famous Third Battle of Panipat. Jahan Khan died on 14 March 1770 due to a colic attack.
