= Battle of Kakhk =

One of the bloodiest battles in Persian history

- Part of Durrani Campaign to Khorasan (1754–1755)
Date	May 1754
Location	Kakhk, near Ferdows
Result	Durrani victory
Territorial changes	Tun and Tabas were annexed by the Afghans

Belligerents
Durrani Empire	Arabs of Tabas

Commanders and leaders
Sardar Jahan Khan; Mir Nasir Khan I	Ali Murad Khan †

Casualties and losses
Unknown	Heavy

The Battle of Kakhk was fought during the second campaign into Khorasan. Afghan forces defeated the army of Ali Murad Khan at Kakhk, and this battle was one of the bloodiest battles in Persian history.

== Background ==
In 1750–1751, Ahmad Shah's first campaign to Khorasan had some sucsess. As a result, Ahmad Shah began preparing for a second campaign beginning in 1754. During this time, Nishapur was besieged by Alam Khan, a former Afsharid viceroy. Upon hearing that Ahmad Shah began his campaign to Khorasan, Alam Khan's army completely dispersed, while the Camesgazak Kurds completely defected to Ahmad Shah and his army. They captured Alam Khan who had fled to Sabzevar, and beheaded him under Ahmad Shah's backing.

== Prelude ==
Ahmad Shah began his campaign in May 1754. Afghan forces departed from Herat and made for Tun. Ahmad Shah dispatched Sardar Jahan Khan and Nasir Khan of Kalat, with them beginning their own campaign of devastating the countryside.

== The Battle ==
They began by devastating the country and creating panic for people, afterwards they would march against the governor of Tabas, Ali Murad Khan, who came out to meet them. The Afghans and the Persians came into Battle at Kakhk, north-east of Ferdows and there was fought "one of the most stubborn and bloodiest battles in Persian history". The arrival of Ali Murad Khan on the battlefield contributed to a marked escalation in the resolve and ferocity of the combatants. When ammunition failed on both sides, they drew their swords and grappled with one another. The contest was even on both sides and victory was indecisive, then, all of a sudden, Ali Murad Khan was killed and Afghans earned victory. The army of Ali Murad Khan routed and Tun and Tabas were annexed by the Afghans.

== Aftermath ==
Most of the credit for the victory goes to Nasir Khan and his Balochis, who all fought like "heroes". the towns of Tun and Tabas were pillaged and devastated, and the Afghans, laden with rich booty, returned to the Shah at Mashhad.

== Sources ==
- Singh, Ganda (1959). Ahmad Shah Durrani: Father of Modern Afghanistan. Asia Publishing House. ISBN 978-1-4021-7278-6.
- Lee, Jonathan L. (8 March 2022). Afghanistan: A History from 1260 to the Present. Reaktion Books. ISBN 978-1-78914-019-4.
- Noelle-Karimi, Christine (2014). The Pearl in Its Midst: Herat and the Mapping of Khurasan (15th-19th Centuries). Austrian Academy of Sciences Press. ISBN 978-3-7001-7202-4.
