= Battle of Chaman Zaghan =

- Part of Durrani Campaign to Khorasan (1749-1751) & Persian–Afghan Wars
| Date | November 1750 |
| Location | Chaman Zaghan, near Mashhad, Khorasan |
| Result | Durrani victory |

Belligerents
| Durrani Empire | Afsharid Iran |

Commanders and leaders
| Shah Wali Khan | Mohammad Hussain † |

Strength
| Unknown | Unknown |

Casualties and losses
| Unknown | 12,000 killed |

The Battle of Chaman Zaghan was a military engagement fought near Mashhad between Shah Wali Khan Durrani and Mohammad Hussain Khan, a prominent Kurdish leader, alongside two of the nephews of Nader Shah. The battle formed part of the wider siege of Mashhad, and its outcome contributed directly to the surrender of the city.

== Background ==
During Ahmad Shah Durrani's advance into Khorasan, the city of Mashhad came under siege. In response, Mohammad Hussain Khan, described as one of the most powerful Kurdish commanders of the region, organized a relief force drawn from Kurdish and Turkic tribes as well as other elements from across Khorasan. The army also included two nephews of Nader Shah. Ahmad Shah Durrani, having been informed of the mobilization, dispatched a royal army under Shah Wali Khan Durrani, to intercept the advancing force before it could reach Mashhad.

== Battle ==
The two armies met near Mashhad at Chaman Zaghan. The engagement resulted in a decisive victory for the Durrani forces. The coalition army led by Mohammad Hussain Khan, including Kurdish and Turkic contingents, was completely annihilated and Mohammad Hussain Khan was slain. The army of Mohammad Hussain Khan fled to the mountains and suffered 12,000 killed.

== Aftermath ==
Following the battle, the bodies of Mohammad Hussain Khan and the nephews of Nader Shah alongside the 12,000 killed soldier were sent to Ahmad Shah at Mashhad. The 12,000 heads of the soldiers were displayed in Mashhad and with the destruction of the relief force, the defenders of Mashhad lost hope of external support. Shortly thereafter, the besieged population surrendered and accepted the terms imposed by Ahmad Shah. This led to the capture of Mashhad by Durrani forces.
