= Siege of Mashhad =

- Siege of Mashhad (1730), during the Persian–Afghan wars
- Siege of Mashhad (1750), during the Persian–Afghan wars
- Siege of Mashhad (1754), during the Persian–Afghan wars
- Siege of Mashhad (1769—1770), during the Persian–Afghan wars
