= Siege of Nishapur =

Siege of Nishapur may refer to:

- Siege of Nishapur (1221), military conflict led by Genghis Khan
- Siege of Nishapur (1750–1751), First Durrani siege of Nishapur
- Siege of Nishapur (1755), Second Durrani siege of Nishapur
