= Rebellion of Azad Khan =

Date	1783– 11 December 1786
Location	Kashmir (Muzaffarabad, Baramulla, Pakhli, Poonch)
Result	Durrani victory

Belligerents
Durrani Empire	Azad Khan of Kashmir; Supported by: Sikh Confederacy

Commanders and leaders
Timur Shah Durrani; Payandah Khan; Mir Muhammad Ali Khan; Murtaza Khan; Zaman Khan; Madad Khan Durrani	Azad Khan ‡‡ Pahlawan Khan; Mulla A‘zam Khan †

Strength
30,000 (In the later stages)	3,000 Sikh and Kashmiri levies

Casualties and losses
Several sardars and soldiers killed or captured in early defeats	2,000 drowned/killed at Muzaffarabad; further losses in later battles

The Rebellion of Azad Khan (1783–1786) was an armed uprising in Kashmir led by Azad Khan, youngest son of Hajji Karimdad Khan, against the authority of Timur Shah Durrani. It escalated from a fiscal and administrative dispute into a full-scale regional war that forced Timur Shah to intervene personally. The revolt saw repeated reversals Azad Khan first smashed two Durrani armies, but was eventually cornered in Poonch and died by suicide shortly before capture.

== Background ==
Hajji Karimdad Khan, a senior arz-begī and a trusted governor of Kashmir under Ahmad Shah Durrani, died in 1783. His youngest son, Azad Khan, was confirmed by Kabul as his successor. Once in office, Azad Khan consolidated his authority aggressively. He expelled his elder brothers, Murtaza Khan and Zaman Khan, diverted state revenues into his own coffers, distributed cash, cloth, and robes of honor to retain the army's loyalty, and enrolled roughly 3,000 Sikhs and other adventurers as nawkars. Azad Khan then stopped remitting revenue to Kabul altogether. His conduct alarmed Timur Shah, who initially hoped to resolve the matter without war.

== Prelude ==
Timur Shah dispatched Mir Muhammad Ali Khan to counsel and restrain Azad Khan. Mir Muhammad Ali Khan confronted him directly in Srinagar, warned him of the consequences, and seized roughly three lakhs of rupees in cash and kind to cover arrears. Outwardly preparing to return to Kabul, he secretly informed the court that Azad Khan showed clear signs of rebellion.

Timur Shah responded by sending a 30,000-man force under the expelled brothers Murtaza and Zaman, accompanied by chiefs including Faiz Talab Khan Muhammadzai, Nawaz Jang Bangash Kohati, Zardar Khan, and Burhan Khan Popalzai. They advanced to the fort of Pakhli, while Azad Khan camped at nearby Muzaffarabad.

== The Rebellion ==
=== First phase: Muzaffarabad and Baramulla ===
A sharp engagement on the Kishanganga ended in disaster for Azad Khan, his commander Mulla A‘zam Khan was killed and around 2,000 of his men drowned or were cut down. Azad attempted to flee by boat but was stopped by his cousin Pahlawan Khan, who forced him to rally the troops. Pahlawan reorganized the army, counterattacked, captured Burhan Khan Popalzai, and drove the Durrani force back.

Azad Khan pressed the advantage. When the Durrani troops regrouped at Pakhli, he marched out again and defeated them a second time near Baramulla, capturing Nawaz Jang Bangash, his son, and several officers. During these clashes, a notable Yusufzai fighter, Sayyid ‘Ulul Shah, resisted fiercely before being taken alive at Azad Khan’s insistence. Impressed by his bravery, Azad placed him on a stipend and had his wounds treated. Azad also attempted to recruit captured Yusufzai prisoners, failed, and after giving them leave to depart secretly ordered boatmen to drown them in the Muzaffarabad River.

=== Second phase: Timur Shah’s personal intervention ===
News of the defeats pushed Timur Shah to act in person. Timur Shah left Kabul in December, 1785, and encamped at Peshawar, on 18 December. Prince Humayun, the son of Timur Shah, crossed the Indus at Attock at the head of 20,000 men and was joined by Faiz Talab Khan and Karim Beg, the principal chiefs, near Attock with 10,000 men. He sent a larger army under Madad Khan Durrani and Payandah Khan. These commanders induced defections among Azad Khan’s supporters by mixing bribes with threats, weakening the Kashmiri position.

Azad attempted a night attack through his officer Shadi Khan, but Madad Khan learned of the plan and beat it off. Repeated encounters produced no decisive breakthrough for Azad, and morale eroded as rumours of collusion spread within his ranks. When evidence of negotiations between his commanders and the Durranis reached him, Azad abandoned the field and withdrew into the mountains of Bunish, seeking refuge with his father-in-law, Raja Rustam Khan.

== Collapse and death ==
Raja Rustam Khan initially sheltered Azad, but after receiving a blunt threat from Madad Khan promising to “roll the two of them in one kilim” and fearing Azad might seize his own territory, he disarmed Azad's party by subterfuge. One morning he locked Azad in his room and informed the Durrani commanders. A detachment of 2,000 horse under Islam Khan arrived to arrest him. Realizing he was trapped and expecting torture, Azad shot himself with a pistol. Islam Khan forced the door, found him dying, and after receiving a final curse from Azad decapitated him and sent the head to Timur Shah. Azad Khan died at twenty-seven and ending the rebellion on the 11th of December 1786.

== Aftermath ==
Timur Shah, despite the rebellion, admired Azad's courage and ordered his burial with respect. Azad's mother was summoned from Qandahar, granted two lakhs of rupees from her son's property, and given further royal favors. She initially refused the Shah's proposal of marriage, but later entered the royal harem, her grandson Fath Jang accompanied her back to Kandahar after the pacification. Kashmir was reabsorbed under firm imperial control.
