= Ayesha Durrani =

Afghan poet

- Front cover of an 1882 collection of Ayesha Durrani's most famous poems
- Born: 1771; Afghanistan
- Died: c.1852 (aged 81)
- Occupation: Poet
- Spouse: Tīmūr Shāh Durrānī
- Writing career
- Notable work: ديوان عايشه (Collected Poems of Aisha Durrani)

Ayesha Durrani, also known as Aisha-i-Durani and Aisha Durrani (1771 — c. 1852) was an Afghan poet, one of the wives of Timur Shah Durrani of the Durrani Empire. A number of her poems were compiled into a manuscript in 1882, and Durrani is credited with founding the first school for girls in Afghanistan.

== Biography ==
Ayesha Durrani was born in late-18th century Afghanistan. She was born into the powerful Barakzai family as the daughter of Yaʻqūb Ali Khān Barakzai, and she later married Tīmūr Shāh Durrānī, the second ruler of the Durrani Empire. Ayesha is recorded as having become an active poet by the waning years of the 18th century, and continued composing poetry into the 19th century; she wrote qasidas, ghazals, and was well versed in Arabic, Persian literature and in Islamic law. Durrani was also noted by several sources as having founded the first school for girls in Afghanistan.

Following the collapse of the Durrani Empire and the rise of the Barakzai-ruled Emirate of Afghanistan in the 19th century, Ayesha's poetry garnered renewed interest. Many of her poems were compiled by an unnamed Afghan scribe into a 336-page manuscript in 1882.

== Legacy ==
Following the 1978 Saur Revolution, the Afghan government promoted the study of Durrani's works in an effort to mobilize female support for the government's social programs.

After the United States-led overthrow of Afghanistan's Taliban government (which had barred women from pursuing an education after age eight), a German foreign aid agency rebuilt two girls' schools in Kabul, naming one the Aisha-i-Durani School in honour of the poet.
