= Battle of the Amu Darya =

1788–89 Durrani-Bukhara engagements

Date	1788–1789
Location	Amu Darya, Balkh and Qataghan (modern northern Afghanistan)
Result	Durrani victory

Belligerents
Durrani Empire	Emirate of Bukhara

Commanders and leaders
Timur Shah Durrani; Madad Khan Ishaqzai; Mir Qilij ʻAli Beg of Khulm	Shah Murad

Strength
40,000	30,000 Cavalry or 100,000

Casualties and losses
Unknown	6,000 Killed

Battle of the Amu Darya (1788–1789) was a series of engagements and manoeuvres fought between forces of the Durrani Empire under Timur Shah Durrani and the forces of the Emirate of Bukhara under Shah Murad Khan along the Amu Darya and in the districts of Balkh, Aqcha and Qataghan. The campaign combined sieges, large-scale marches across the Hindu Kush and a decisive field engagement in which Bukharan columns were heavily beaten. The result was a negotiated settlement that largely reaffirmed earlier agreements but left the Durrani position in the north precarious.

== Background ==
In the summer of 1788 Shah Murad Khan, taking advantage of Timur Shah's attention on Multan, crossed the Amu Darya with support from several amirs of the Chahar Wilayat. Bukharan forces occupied Aqcha, expelled the small Durrani garrison and then moved to invest Balkh, surrounding the remaining hakim's troops in the citadel. Timur Shah recalled Madad Khan Ishaqzai from Multan and sent him with a relief force reported at about 40,000 while assembling a larger army at Kabul to march north himself. Before Timur reached the theatre, internal dissension in the Bukharan camp including the death of one of Shah Murad's sons temporarily broke Bukharan cohesion.

Despite this, Shah Murad renewed operations the following spring and again crossed the Amu Darya. Timur Shah responded by advancing with a very large force reported in contemporary accounts as some 150,000 men. The extraordinary size of the Durrani army, however, strained logistics in the mountain passes and proved a strategic liability in harsh winter conditions.

== Battle ==
Timur Shah's march north encountered immediate difficulties, supply shortages in the mountain passes, artillery immobilised in snowbound tracks, and armed clashes with the Shaikh ʻAli Hazaras when customary payments for passage were withheld. After forcing his way across the Shibar Pass and down the Surkhab valley Timur reached Baghlan, where he was joined by Mir Qilij ʻAli Beg the Mir Wali of Khulm. Acting on Mir Wali's advice, Timur first moved to secure Qataghan, despite the numerical superiority of Timur's army the Qataghan cavalry proved dangerous, and a political settlement was reached that left Mizrab Bi as ataliq in return for acknowledging Durrani suzerainty and paying tribute.

Following operations in Qataghan Timur advanced on Balkh. The Bukharans withdrew from the immediate siege lines and fell back into the Chahar Wilayat in an effort to draw the Durrani forces into an overextended supply situation. Shah Murad then organized a night attack, two columns of cavalry reported at roughly 30,000 men crossed the Amu Darya in a bid to encircle Timur's army. Thanks to intelligence from the Mir Wali's network Timur positioned his troops across the line of attack, in the ensuing battle the Bukharan assault was repulsed and contemporary sources place Bukharan losses at about 6,000 killed. Following this defeat Shah Murad dispatched senior religious envoys to negotiate, he reconfirmed earlier agreements dating from 1768 and Timur Shah in turn acknowledged Bukharan sovereignty over Shahr-i Sabz and Merv.

== Aftermath ==
Timur Shah withdrew toward Kabul but left roughly 4,000 cavalry under Muhammad Khan Qizilbash to garrison Aqcha and the citadel at Balkh. The Durrani retreat over the Hindu Kush proved catastrophic, winter came early, upper valleys and passes were blocked by snow, many soldiers lacked winter clothing, and thousands perished of exposure. The severe losses and the logistical drain encouraged the amirs of the Chahar Wilayat to renounce Durrani overlordship and insert Shah Murad's name in the khutba. Thus while the Durranis regained a measure of control over Balkh and Aqcha, the campaign produced limited durable gains and imposed a heavy fiscal burden on the Durrani state contemporary estimates describe an annual cost to the treasury of more than half a million rupee.
