= Siege of Bahawalpur =

1780 siege of Timur Shah Durrani's Indian campaign

Date	1780
Location	Bahawalpur, Durrani Empire
Result	Durrani victory

Belligerents
Durrani Empire	Bahawalpur State

Commanders and leaders
Timur Shah Durrani; Madad Khan Ishaqzai	Muhammad Bahawal Khan (surrendered)

Strength
20,000	Unknown

Casualties and losses
Unknown	Heavy

The Siege of Bahawalpur took place during Timur Shah Durrani’s Indian expedition of 1780-81 after the ruler of Bahawalpur refused to pay tribute. Afghan forces occupied the city and besieged the Nawab’s fortress, where an internal explosion forced his submission and the restoration of Durrani authority in southern Punjab.

== Background ==
Following the death of Ahmad Shah Durrani, the authority of the Durrani Empire in the Punjab weakened as several tributary chiefs withheld payments and asserted de facto independence. Among them was Rukn-ud-Daulah Muhammad Bahawal Khan, ruler of Bahawalpur, who had previously acknowledged Ahmad Shah’s suzerainty but ceased paying tribute to his successor, Timur Shah Durrani.

Bahawal Khan’s defiance coincided with similar actions by regional chiefs in Multan and Sind, who occupied revenue districts and suspended payments to Durrani officials. These developments posed a direct challenge to imperial authority in southern Punjab and threatened the strategic corridor between Multan and the Indus.

Determined to reassert control, Timur Shah marched toward India during the cold weather of 1780 with a substantial force. The campaign was intended both as a punitive expedition and as a demonstration of continued Afghan dominance in the region. The main Durrani army advanced to Multan under several senior chiefs, while Timur Shah followed with the imperial camp. Upon receiving news of the Shah’s approach, Bahawal Khan abandoned the town of Bahawalpur, evacuating his family, treasury, and provisions on camels. Anticipating a prolonged confrontation, he withdrew into a fortified stronghold situated deep within a waterless desert, designed specifically to withstand siege conditions.

== Siege ==
Durrani advance detachments entered Bahawalpur ahead of the Shah, plundering the town and setting fire to several buildings. After Timur Shah arrived, the remaining property of the Nawab was confiscated by the royal administration, further weakening Bahawal Khan’s position. Timur Shah then dispatched Sardar Madad Khan Ishaqzai with 20,000 cavalry to conduct the siege of the desert fortress. The force was initially provisioned for only three days, reflecting expectations of a short operation. Recognizing that water scarcity was the critical obstacle, Madad Khan oversaw the digging of wells in the surrounding area. These efforts proved successful, yielding sufficient water to sustain the besieging army and allowing the operation to continue indefinitely.

The defenders mounted determined resistance and repelled repeated attempts to capture the fort by direct assault. Artillery bombardment was therefore intensified. During one engagement, the fort’s powder magazine caught fire, triggering a major explosion that killed a large number of defenders and caused significant structural damage to the fortifications. The explosion proved decisive. With morale shattered and defenses compromised, Bahawal Khan abandoned further resistance and sought terms.

== Aftermath ==
Bahawal Khan sued for peace by sending his son to Timur Shah’s camp at Bahawalpur as a sign of submission. He agreed to pay the accumulated arrears of tribute, formally acknowledged Timur Shah as his sovereign, and pledged continued loyalty to the Durrani crown. Under the settlement, Bahawal Khan undertook to: resume regular payment of tribute and taxes to imperial officials and Provide military assistance to the Durrani Empire in the event of conflict with the Sikh Confederacy Timur Shah accepted the submission, pardoned the Nawab, and confirmed him in his position. Bahawal Khan’s son accompanied the Shah as a hostage to guarantee future compliance.

After securing Bahawalpur, Timur Shah withdrew toward Peshawar and later returned to Kabul, having restored Durrani authority over southern Punjab. The campaign alarmed the Sikhs, who feared a renewed Afghan advance and subsequently attacked a Durrani military post near Multan in November 1780, extracting rakhi tribute before withdrawing.
