= Succession crisis =

A succession crisis is a crisis that arises when an order of succession fails, for example when a monarch dies without an indisputable heir. It may result in a war of succession.

Examples include (see List of wars of succession):

- Multiple periods during the history of the Roman Empire:
  - Year of the Four Emperors (69 AD)
  - Year of the Five Emperors (193 AD)
  - Year of the Six Emperors (238 AD)
- Bolesław I's intervention in the Kievan succession crisis (1018)
- Competitors for the Crown of Scotland (1290), followed by English intervention and Wars of Scottish Independence
- 1383–1385 Crisis, the 1383–1385 succession crisis over the throne of Portugal
- The Wars of The Roses (1455–1487)
- 1558–1559, English succession crisis after the death of Mary I of England
- Portuguese succession crisis of 1580, the 1580 succession crisis over the throne of Portugal
- The succession of Henry IV of France (1589), which provoked persistent Catholic resistance with Spanish support and led to war with Spain in 1595
- 1598 Times of Troubles in Russia
- War of the Spanish Succession (1701–1714) over who would succeed Charles II of Spain
- Afghan succession crisis of 1772
- Hymen's war terrific (1817)
- The Carlist Wars in Spain (1833–1876).
- The 1841 succession crisis in the United States following the death of William Henry Harrison, concerning whether his successor became President of the United States or merely assumed the powers of the office.
- Succession crisis (Latter Day Saints), the 1844 leadership crisis in the Latter Day Saint movement after the death of Joseph Smith
- Monaco succession crisis of 1918, the 1918 succession crisis over the throne of Monaco
- A Game of Thrones & Fire and Blood, novels that centre the plot around the repercussions of kings dying and leaving disputable heirs. Both novels have been adapted to live-action series.
