= Battle of Rohtas (1779) =

Part of campaigns of Timur Shah

- Part of Afghan–Sikh Wars
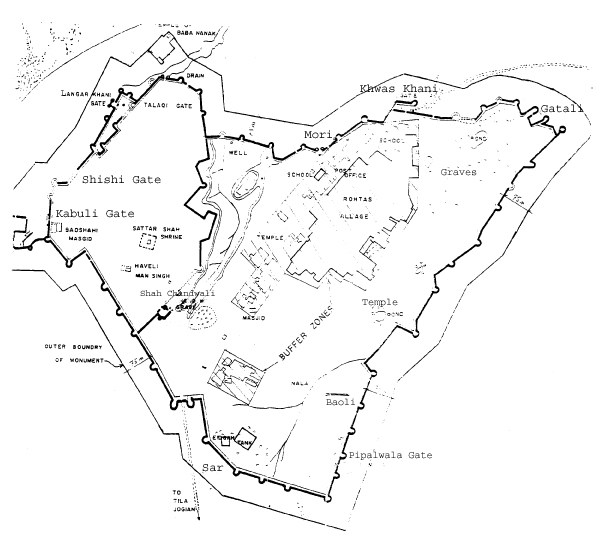
- Layout of Rohtas Fort.
Date	December 1779
Location	Rohtas Fort
Result	Durrani victory
Territorial changes	Durrani Empire secures Rohtas Fort

Belligerents
Durrani Empire	Bhangi Misl

Commanders and leaders
Timur Shah Durrani; Zangi Khan	Unknown

Strength
18,000	Unknown, presumably around 5,500 (by Hari Ram Gupta). Estimates up to 30,000 (by Faiz Muhammad Kateb).

Casualties and losses
Unknown	3,000 Sikhs killed (by Hari Ram Gupta); 500 drowned Around 30,000 dead (by Faiz Muhammad Kateb)

The Battle of Rohtas (Pashto; ده روهتاس جګړه) took place somewhere in December 1779, between Timur Shah Durrani and the Bhangi Misl. Timur Shah consolidated his rule through multiple attempts, and also attempted an earlier invasion in 1775, however realizing the weakness of his army in view of smaller in number, Timur Shah retired to Peshawar which proceeded with rebellion by Faizullah Khan, who plotted to assassinate Timur Shah but was cunningly executed. In late 1779, Timur Shah decided to conquer Multan.

== Background ==
The Sikhs conquered Multan in 1772. Timur Shah ascended to the throne of the Durrani Empire after his father's death. Due to Sikhs having been in possession of the provinces of Lahore and Multan, these provinces served as a barrier for any attempt by Timur Shah to invade, many chiefs and nobility, dependencies of Durranis, paid no respect to the Durrani sovereignty, such as Sindh which reduced the amount of tribute and hardly paid it, mostly due to its concurrent civil war between the Talpurs, and the Kalhoras; Nasir Khan Baloch, the ruler of the Khanate of Kalat did not acknowledge the authority of Afghan monarch, as a result, inducing other Durrani chiefdoms to do the same, including the chief of Bahawalpur, who treated the authority of Timur Shah with no respect. Timur Shah thereupon tried to recover Multan by diplomacy and therefore sent Haji Ali Khan, as his agent, along with companions, to the Bhangi Sikh Chiefs to negotiate, with advice to behave and be polite, but instead, Haji Ali Khan threatened the Bhangi Chiefs to retire from Multan or face the royal wrath. The Bhangis tied Haji to the tree and shot him dead whereas his companions were left unharmed and sent back to report to Timur.

== Battle ==
Upon the news of death of his agent, Timur Shah detached a force of 18,000 men that included Yusafzais, Durranis, Mughals and Qizalbashes under general Zangi Khan, with orders to march by less known routes and fall upon the Sikhs unaware and Zangi Khan gave strict orders to his army to keep the movement secret. Zangi Khan halted 25 km from the Sikh camps with orders to imprison anyone who goes in the direction of the Sikh camp to make the Sikhs aware of their presence. Timur Shah positioned himself in the centre, at the head of 5,000 Yusafzai men. Little before daybreak, the Sikhs completely unorganised and unaware of Afghan army's presence, were attacked.Despite fierce resistance from the Sikhs, they were eventually overwhelmed. About 3,000 Sikhs were killed, and 500 others drowned in river Jhelum in trying to cross it during the Sikh retreat, while 2,000 escaped by successfully reaching the opposite bank of the river.

== Aftermath ==
Following the victory, Timur Shah Durrani captured Multan after negotiations were held when the Afghans sieged it in February 1780, following which Timur Shah appointed Muzaffar Khan as the Nazim of Multan and Abdul Karim Khan Babar, a defected Muslim general of the Sikh army was appointed as Naib (Chief officer) of Muzaffar Khan. Multan would remain under Afghan rule until its loss in 1818 to the Sikh Empire, during the Siege of Multan.
