= Battle of Shujabad (1780) =

Battle of Shujabad in 1780, Sikh Misls vs Afghans

- Part of Afghan–Sikh Wars
Date	8 February 1780
Location	Shujabad
Result	Afghan victory

Belligerents
Durrani Empire	Sikh Misls

Commanders and leaders
Timur Shah Durrani; Muzaffar Khan	Jassa Singh; Gujjar Singh Bhangi; Haqiqat Singh Kanhaiya; Lehna Singh Bhangi; Bhanga Singh

Strength
12,000 reinforcments from Bahawalpur; Unknown number under Timur Shah	15,000

Casualties and losses
Unknown	2,000 killed or wounded according to Hari Ram Gupta and Dalbir Singh; 700 killed or wounded according to Aruj-I-Sikhan

The Battle of Shujabad took place in February 1780, during the Afghan–Sikh Wars. The Afghans were led by Muzaffar Khan and Timur Shah Durrani, while the Sikhs were led by Jassa Singh Ahluwalia and other Sikh chiefs.

== Background ==
Early in January 1780, Timur Shah Durrani laid siege to Multan. Though the Sikhs were fewer in number, Timur Shah believed his resources were not enough, and as a result, dispatched a small force to Bahawalpur, while leaving the majority of his force at Multan.

== Battle ==
Muzaffar Khan left Bahawalpur and met the Sikh force at Shujabad, where the battle was fought on 8 February 1780. A dust storm raged during the battle, causing low visibility. During the clash, Muzaffar Khan's forces took a Sikh drummer prisoner. Khan spared the drummer on the assurance that he would beat the drum to lure the Sikhs into an ambush. While Sikh forces were drawn to the drumming, Muzaffar Khan arranged his forces into two columns, where one soldier would hold an enemy down so the other could kill him. The Sikhs lost thousands of men to the trap, forcing them to retreat to Lahore. The Sikhs were defeated and suffered between 700 and 2,000 casualties. The Sikh force fled to Lahore and Timur Shah dispatched 20,000 soldiers in pursuit. The force overtook the Sikhs at Hujra Muqim Khan, 40 miles west of Lahore and defeated them.

== Aftermath ==
Following this, the Afghans reorganized at Multan and took it in the 1780 Siege of Multan. Muzaffar Khan became governor of Multan following its capture by the Afghans.

== See also ==
- Siege of Multan (1780)
- Timur Shah Durrani
- Indian campaign of Ahmad Shah Durrani
