= Siege of Mashhad (1750) =

- Part of Durrani Campaign to Khorasan (1749–51)
Date	July – 10 November 1750
Location	Mashhad, Khorasan, Afsharid Iran
Result	Durrani victory

Belligerents
Durrani Empire	Afsharid Iran

Commanders and leaders
Ahmad Shah Durrani	Shahrokh Afshar (surrendered)

Strength
Unknown	Unknown

The Siege of Mashhad took place between July and 10 November 1750 during the Durrani campaigns in Khorasan (1750–1751). It ended with the surrender of Shahrokh Afshar to Ahmad Shah Durrani, establishing Durrani suzerainty over Mashhad and large parts of Khorasan.

== Background ==
Following the death of Mir Alam Khan, the Afghan commander opposing the Durranis in Khorasan, Ahmad Shah advanced toward Mashhad, the principal stronghold of the Afsharid ruler Shah Rukh. The fortress of Nun, commanded by Mir Masum Khan, Alam's brother, offered brief resistance but capitulated quickly after news of Alam's death. Masum Khan personally handed over the keys to Ahmad Shah, opening the road to Mashhad.

== Siege ==
Ahmad Shah Durrani soon laid siege to Mashhad, the seat of Shah Rukh Afshar. The city was strongly defended by 8,000 Afsharid defenders and several Afghan assaults were repulsed by the Persian garrison. Despite this, the Durranis maintained a strict blockade, gradually exhausting the defenders’ supplies and morale. In response to the siege of Mashhad, Mohammad Hussain Khan, organized a relief force drawn from Kurdish and Turkic tribes as well as other elements from across Khorasan. The army also included two nephews of Nader Shah. Ahmad Shah Durrani, having been informed of the mobilization, dispatched a royal army under Shah Wali Khan Durrani, to intercept the advancing force before it could reach Mashhad. The two armies met near Mashhad at Chaman Zaghan. The engagement resulted in a decisive victory for the Durrani forces. The coalition army led by Mohammad Hussain Khan, including Kurdish and Turkic contingents, was completely annihilated and Mohammad Hussain Khan was slain. The army of Mohammad Hussain Khan fled to the mountains and suffered 12,000 killed.

Following the battle, the bodies of Mohammad Hussain Khan and the nephews of Nader Shah alongside the 12,000 killed soldier were sent to Ahmad Shah at Mashhad. The 12,000 heads of the soldiers were displayed in Mashhad and with the destruction of the relief force, the defenders of Mashhad lost hope of external support. Shortly thereafter, the besieged population surrendered and accepted the terms imposed by Ahmad Shah. This led to the capture of Mashhad by Durrani forces and Shahrokh was forced to Surrender. He personally came to Ahmad Shah's camp, where he was treated with outward courtesy. Ahmad Shah agreed to preserve Shahrokh on the throne of Mashhad, but only as his vassal. The conditions imposed required Shah Rukh to pay a large indemnity and to release members of Ahmad Shah's family who had remained in Afsharid custody since the death of Nader Shah.

== Aftermath ==
While Ahmad Shah consolidated his rule in Khorasan, developments in Mazandaran required attention. Muhammad Husain Qajar, son of Fath Ali Khan, had entrenched himself at Astarabad, claiming authority over Mazandaran. Fearing disruption to his arrangements in Khorasan, Ahmad Shah dispatched a division under Shah Pasand Khan to suppress him, while he himself marched toward Nishapur.
