= Yaqut Khan =

18th century Afghan eunuch

- Died: January 1775
- Employer: Durrani Empire
- Known for: Afghan eunuch

Yaqut Khan (died 1775) was an Afghan eunuch to Afghan Emperor Ahmad Shah Durrani during the 18th century. He is known for supporting Timur Shah Durrani during his conflict with his elder brother, Sulaiman. He later attempted in a conspiracy to assassinate Timur Shah, which failed, resulting in his own execution.

== Durrani succession crisis ==
Upon the death of Ahmad Shah Durrani, his declared heir, Timur Shah Durrani, was not favored by Shah Wali Khan, who instead preferred Timur's elder brother, Sulaiman. Sulaiman ascended the throne despite opposition from other Durrani nobles. To prevent word of Ahmad Shah's death getting out, Ahmad Shah's lifeless body was placed on a litter with tall thick curtains. Shah Wali then stated to nobles after arriving at Kandahar, that Ahmad Shah was ill, and that nobody should disturb him. Yaqut Khan, the chief eunuch, brought food for the king to keep up a facade.

However, Yaqut Khan, secretly holding loyalties to Timur Shah Durrani, sent a confidential letter that informed him of Sulaiman's usurpation of the throne. Timur Shah was enraged and immediately assembled an army, marching onwards to Kandahar. Upon reaching Farah, support for Sulaiman's faction quickly dissipated. Shah Wali Khan, alongside Sadar Jahan Khan, arrived at Timur's camp pleading for mercy. Timur Shah, who was incensed that they did not allow him to see his father's deathbed, executed them. As a result, Sulaiman fled to India, while Timur Shah entered Kandahar, being crowned.

== Peshawar conspiracy and death ==
Yaqub Khan became involved in a plot against Timur Shah in 1775 led by Arsala Khan. In January 1775, Arsala Khan was given permission by Timur Shah to enter Peshawar where he was preparing for campaigns into the Punjab. While Timur Shah was celebrating, Arsala Khan alongside 2,500 men marched to the arg and approached guards, informing them that they were told to celebrate inside. While the guards were distracted, Faizullah and Yaqut Khan invaded through a back gate and killed numerous guards, entering the parade grounds, and attempting to enter the inner keep where Timur Shah was resting.

Hearing the commotion, Timur Shah climbed to the top of the tower, and used his turban to signal to fellow guards below of the desperate situation. Timur Shah's Qizilbash guards attacked the conspirators from the rear, and completely killed or captured the entire army. Yaqut Khan, as well as Faizullah Khan were executed, while Arsala Khan escaped.
