= Siege of Nishapur (1750–1751) =

Military conflict in Persia

- Part of Durrani Campaign to Khorasan (1749–51)
Date	1750–1751
Location	Nishapur, Qara Bayat Amirdom, (modern day Iran)
Result	Qara Bayat victory
Territorial changes	Durrani retreat from Nishapur

Belligerents
Durrani Empire	Qara Bayat Amirdom

Commanders and leaders
Ahmad Shah Durrani	Abbas Quli Khan; Jafar Khan †

Casualties and losses
12,000 killed and wounded during the withdrawal	Unknown

The siege of Nishapur (Persian: محاصره نیشابور) was a military conflict between the Durrani Empire led by Ahmad Shah Durrani and the Qara Bayat Amirdom led by Abbas Qoli Khan The siege ended with the retreat of Ahmad Shah Durrani due to winter weather and heavy casualties

== Background ==
Intent on conquering Herat Ahmad Shah besieged the city for a long period of time until it finally fell in late 1750. With the fall of Herat, Ahmad Shah continued his campaign into Khorasan invading the Afsharids and besieging Mashhad and Shahrokh Shah surrendered

== Siege ==
After Ahmad Shah's victory in Herat and Mashhad he besieged Nishapur The ruler of Nishapur Abbas Quli Khan found himself unprepared to make a successful resistance and he was advised to protract the negotiations until the winter (which was at hand) should have set in. Abbas Quli Khan kept the Afghans waiting before the walls for two months, until the cold had attained to a very considerable degree of severity and the blizzards also to their full strength and soon Jafar Khan, refused peace despite only having a few thousand men as garrison. Ahmad Shah ordered the walls to be breached, utilizing cannons, which the Afghans surged through. However, the defenders of the city had established defenses and a trap, which the Afghans fell into. Close-quarters combat began after, in which Jafar Khan was killed. His nephew, Abbas Quli, took command of the garrison and repulsed the Afghan forces winter set in and Ahmad Shahs troops suffered heavy losses. Ahmad Shah still persisted in the siege With his army seriously weakened, Ahmad Shah ordered a retreat to Herat. The harsh winter weather killed thousands while the Afghans retreatedThe harsh winter weather killed thousands while the Afghans retreated, and Ahmad Shah was forced to leave behind much of his baggage, including his artillery and food supplies. When the Afghans reached the Hari Rud river, it was completely frozen. Attempting to cross it caused much of the ice to break, killing even more men and sweeping away pack animals for the army.

== Aftermath ==
Because of Ahmad Shah's defeat in the siege, In 1754, Ahmad Shah invaded Khorasan again and besieged Nishapur On 17 June 1755, the Afghan armies arrived at Nishapur, and immediately Abbas Qoli Khan submitted without opposition and sought to be pardoned for giving resistance during Ahmad Shah's first campaign in Khorasan. Not long after, however, Nishapur raised in rebellion due to news that Shah Pasand Khan had possibly been defeated by the Qajars. As a result the gates of the city were closed on Ahmad Shah's troops. This began a one-week siege. During the siege, Ahmad Shah lacked important siege equipment, and as a result, every mounted soldier carried many kilograms of gunmetals. As the siege began, Armenian cannon makers melted down the metal the soldiers carried, and forged a large cannon. The first shot of the cannon blasted through the city walls, and even caused havoc in the city through houses and bazaars. The weapon forced the submission of the cities elders, and they opened the gates despite Abbas Qoli Khan's opposition.

== Sources ==
- Singh, Ganḍā (1959). Ahmad Shah Durrani: Father of Modern Afghanistan. Asia Publishing House. p. 457. ISBN 978-1-4021-7278-6.
- Lee, Jonathan L. (2022-03-08). Afghanistan: A History from 1260 to the Present. Reaktion Books. ISBN 978-1-78914-019-4.
- Noelle-Karimi, Christine (2014). The Pearl in Its Midst: Herat and the Mapping of Khurasan (15th-19th Centuries). Austrian Academy of Sciences Press. ISBN 978-3-7001-7202-4.
- Perry, John R. (1985). "ʿALAM KHAN". Encyclopedia Iranica.
- Percy‌ Sykes, History of Afghanistan
- G.P Tate, The Kingdom of Afghanistan
- Robert, Mohammad Mehdi Khorrami, McChesney, The History of Afghanistan (6 Vol.Set)
- Louis Dupree, Afghanistan
- Anara Tabyshalieva, Madhavan, K. Palat, History of Civilizations of Central Asia
