= Battle of Gokul =

Battle between Afghans and Hindus

Date	16 March 1757
Location	Gokul, Mughal Empire

Belligerents
Durrani Empire	Naga Sadhus

Commanders and leaders
Ahmad Shah Durrani	Unknown

Strength
Unknown	Unknown

Casualties and losses
2,000 killed	2,000 killed

The Battle of Gokul (1757) was fought between Ahmad Shah Durrani’s forces and the Naga Sadhus. Despite heavy losses on both sides (about 2,000 each), the Afghans won but spared the city after learning it held no valuables.

== Background ==
Toward the end of February 1757, the Afghan forces arrived in Mathura and sacked it. The city, despite being inhabited overwhelmingly by non-combatants, mainly pilgrims of the Hindu Holi festival, was attacked and the inhabitants were massacred by the Afghans. The Afghan forces slaughtered and defiled the bodies of Hindu ascetics by humiliating them with slaughtered cows. Temples of the city were razed, and the images of idols were destroyed. Jahan Khan furthered the massacre by rewarding a bounty of five rupees for every Hindu head, resulting in the death of thousands of men, women, and children. And the Muslims that lived in the city were only looted but their lives were spared. Following his massacre at Mathura, Jahan Khan continued his campaign, with the city of Vrindavan being attacked and its inhabitants massacred on 6 March. The Tarikh-I-Husain Shahi establishes the idol destruction in line with iconoclasm, remarking: "Idols were broken and kicked about like polo-balls by the Islamic heroes."

== Battle ==
On 16 March, Jahan Khan led an assault on the city of Gokul which was inhabited by Naga Sadhus, part of the Dasanami Sampradaya. A battle ensued, resulting in roughly 2,000 deaths on each side. Although Afghans won the engagement, Jugal Kishor, a diplomat from the Bengal Subah, informed Ahmad Shah there was nothing of value in Gokul. Ahmad Shah recalled his troops, sparing the city from sacking.

== Aftermath ==
On 21 March, Jahan Khan arrived before Agra with 15,000 men, besieging the city. Civilians from the town received Jahan Khan and his army, promising 500,000 rupees in tribute. However, after failing to raise the amount, Afghan forces entered the city, plundering it and massacring over 2,000. The Afghan forces attempted to seize Agra Fort but failed due to the defense of Mirza Saifullah, the garrison commander. He defended the fort with extensive artillery usage, preventing the Afghans from approaching with cannons. Jahan Khan seized 100,000 rupees in tribute, before withdrawing to Ahmad Shah's camp on 24 March after being recalled.

== Bibliography ==
- Lee, Jonathan L. (2022-03-08). Afghanistan: A History from 1260 to the Present. Reaktion Books. ISBN 978-1-78914-019-4.
- Singh, Ganda (1959). Ahmad Shah Durrani: Father of Modern Afghanistan. Asia Publishing House. ISBN 978-1-4021-7278-6.
- Gupta, Hari Ram (1961). Marathas and Panipat. Panjab University.
- Sarkar, Sir Jadunath (1971). 1754-1771 (Panipat) (3rd; 1966, 1971 printing ed.). Orient Longman.
