= Durrani Campaign to Khorasan (1754–1755) =

Second Durrani Campaign to Khorasan

- Part of Campaigns of Ahmad Shah Durrani
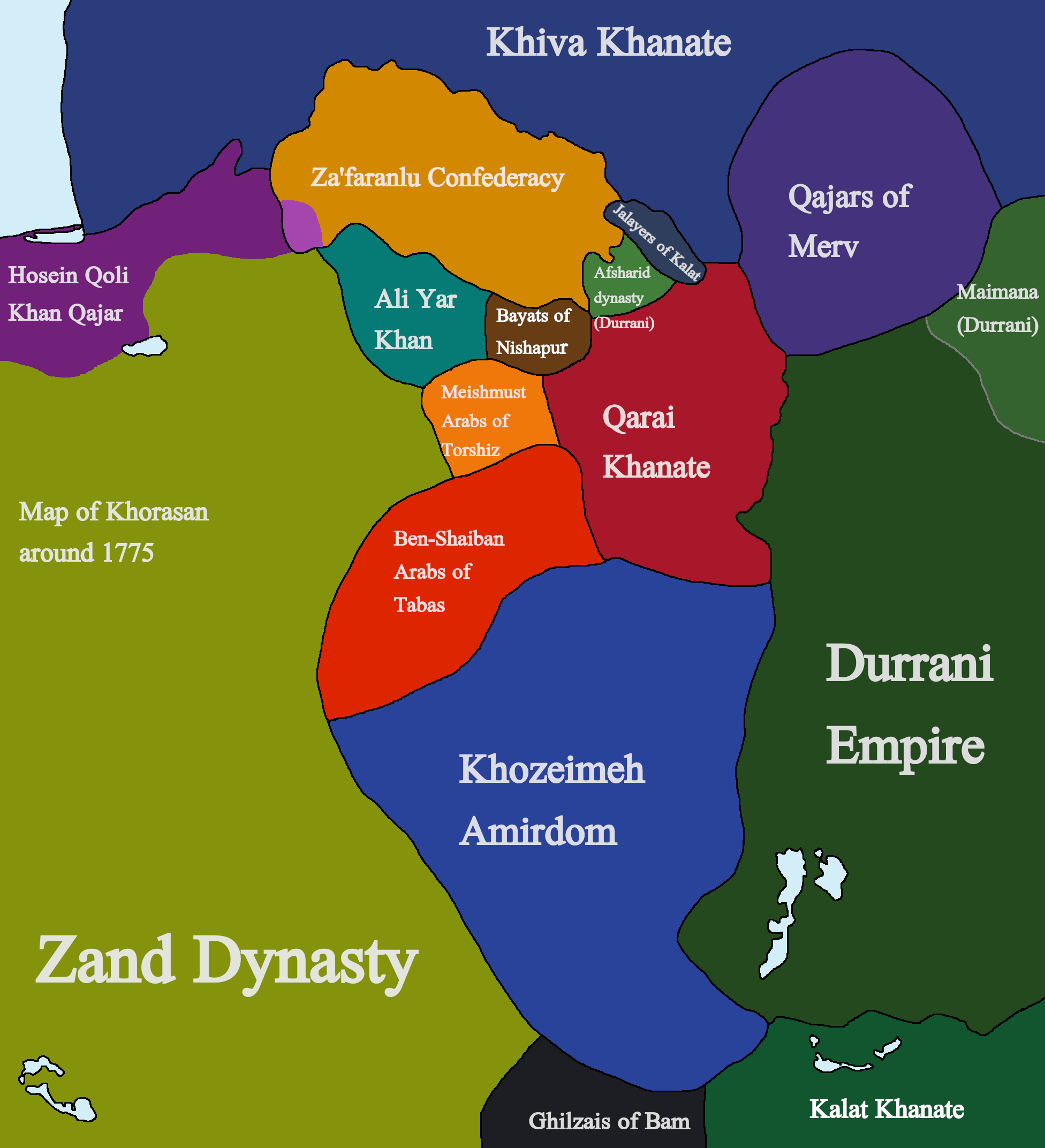
- Map of Khorasan in 1775
| Date | May 1754 – 24 June 1755 |
| Location | Khorasan province |
| Result | Durrani victory |

Belligerents
| Durrani Empire; Khanate of Kalat | Afsharids; Qajar dynasty Qara Bayat Amirdom; Khozeimeh Amirdom |

Commanders and leaders
| Ahmad Shah Durrani; Sardar Jahan Khan; Shah Pasand Khan; Mir Nasir Khan I | Shahrokh Shah; Abbas Qoli Khan; Ali Murad Khan †; Alam Khan (executed) |

The second Durrani Campaign to Khorasan took place between 1754–1755. Ahmad Shah Durrani launched the campaign to avenge his defeat in the first campaign of Khorasan against the rulers of Nishapur, intending to advance on Mashhad and then Nishapur to bring the cities to submission.

The campaign began in the summer of 1754, with Afghan forces defeating the governor of Tabas's army and raiding the countryside while forcing cities into submission. The Afghan army then advanced on Mashhad. After a protracted siege, the city fell and the Afsharids were brought under Afghan suzerainty. Afghan forces then began advancing on Nishapur, besieging and finally conquering the city, ending the campaign.

== Background ==
In 1750–1751, Ahmad Shah's first campaign to Khorasan had little success and many losses. As a result, Ahmad Shah began preparing for a second campaign beginning in 1754. During this time, Nishapur was besieged by Alam Khan, a former Afsharid viceroy. Upon hearing that Ahmad Shah began his campaign to Khorasan, Alam Khan's army completely dispersed, while the Camesgazak Kurds completely defected to Ahmad Shah and his army. They captured Alam Khan who had fled to Sabzevar, and beheaded him under Ahmad Shah's backing.

== Campaign ==
Ahmad Shah began his campaign in May 1754. Afghan forces departed from Herat and made for Tun. Ahmad Shah dispatched Sardar Jahan Khan and Nasir Khan of Kalat, with them beginning their own campaign of devastating the countryside. Following this, they marched against the governor of Tabas, Ali Murad Khan, who also assembled his own army and met the Afghans in battle, with Singh describing the battle that took place as one of the most bloodiest battles in Persian history. Ammunition failed to gain any clear advantage for both sides, forcing both armies to draw swords and began clashing. The battle remained indecisive until Ali Murad Khan was killed, and the remaining Persian army was routed.

With their opposition defeated, Tabas and Tun were conquered in between of June and July 1754 by the Afghans. The Afghan armies continued their march unto Mashhad, arriving before the city on 23 July. A long siege protracted until Shahrokh Shah finally surrendered to Ahmad Shah on 1 December 1754. On the 4th, Ahmad Shah's name was read in the sermon, acknowledging his sovereignty and paramountcy over the Afsharids.

With their victory, the domains Torshiz, Bakharz, Jam, Khaf, and Turbat-e Haidari were annexed from the Afsharids into the Durranis. Following this, Ahmad Shah then began his march on Nishapur in the following spring of 1755, while Shah Pasand Khan set out to march to Mazandaran against the Qajars.

=== Siege of Nishapur ===
On 17 June 1755, the Afghan armies arrived at Nishapur, and immediately, Abbas Qoli Khan submitted without opposition and sought to be pardoned for giving resistance during Ahmad Shah's first campaign in Khorasan. Not long after, however, Nishapur raised in rebellion due to news that Shah Pasand Khan had possibly been defeated by the Qajars.

As a result, the gates of the city were closed on Ahmad Shah's troops. This began a one-week siege. During the siege, Ahmad Shah lacked important siege equipment, and as a result, every mounted soldier carried many kilograms of gunmetals. As the siege began, Armenian cannon makers melted down the metal the soldiers carried, and forged a large cannon. The first shot of the cannon blasted through the city walls, and even caused havoc in the city through houses and bazaars.

The weapon forced the submission of the cities elders, and they opened the gates despite Abbas Qoli Khan's opposition. The city was then subsequently plundered, with the populace of the city spared if they went to mosques and didn't take anything with them. Afghan forces went to houses and then began tearing down the defenses of the city, with a large part of the city being entirely razed.

=== Defeat of the Qajars ===
Following the victory at Nishapur, Ahmad Shah defeated the Qajars and followed up that victory by sacking the cities of Tun and Tabas, also instilling massacres in their cities.

== Aftermath ==
On 9 May 1755, Shahrokh Shah was officially re-instated as ruler over Mashhad, effectively as a Durrani protectorate.

== See also ==
- Ahmad Shah Durrani
- Durrani Empire
- Afsharid Iran
