= Durrani Campaign to Khorasan (1749–1751) =

Inconclusive Afghan invasion into Iran

Date	1749–1751
Location	Khorasan province
Result	Inconclusive

Belligerents
Durrani Empire	Afsharids; Qara Bayat Amirdom

Commanders and leaders
Ahmad Shah Durrani	Shahrokh Shah; Abbas Quli Khan; Jafar Khan †

Casualties and losses
Heavy	Unknown

The first Durrani campaign to Khorasan (Persian: حمله احمدشاه درانی به خراسان) took place between 1750–1751 It saw Ahmad Shah Durrani, ruler of the Durrani Empire, invade the region of Khorasan to establish his supremacy in the region.

== Background ==
Between 1749–1750, after his second invasion of India, Ahmad Shah launched his first campaign into Khorasan.

== Campaign ==
Intent on conquering Herat, Ahmad Shah besieged the city for a long period of time until it finally fell in late 1750.

With the fall of Herat, Ahmad Shah continued his campaign into Khorasan, invading the Afsharids and besieging Mashhad, where he remained until November 1750. Attempts to storm the city by the Afghans were unsuccessful, and Lee and Gupta state that Shahrokh Shah surrendered to Ahmad Shah personally so he could raise the siege. Shahrokh Shah accepted Afghan suzerainty, paying large tribute and releasing members of Ahmad Shah's family.

Noelle however, states that Ahmad Shah lifted the siege on 10 November, and was intent on returning years later. Shahrokh Shah had released a son of Ahmad Shah, possibly being Timur Shah Durrani, or Ahmad Shah's youngest son, Sanjar Mirza.

=== Siege of Nishapur ===
Nonetheless, after the siege of Mashhad, Ahmad Shah advanced to Nishapur, which was ruled by the Qara Bayat Amirdom. He besieged the city and demanded its surrender, which the governor, Jafar Khan, refused despite only having a few thousand men as garrison. Ahmad Shah ordered the walls to be breached, utilizing cannons, which the Afghans surged through. However, the defenders of the city had established defenses and a trap, which the Afghans fell into. Close-quarters combat began after, in which Jafar Khan was killed. His nephew, Abbas Quli, took command of the garrison and repulsed the Afghan forces, inflicting horrific casualties unto them, including some 12,000 dead, and thousands more wounded. With his army seriously weakened, Ahmad Shah ordered a retreat to Herat.

== Aftermath ==
Upon the armies return to Herat, Ahmad Shah faced an assassination conspiracy from Darwish Ali Khan Hazara, Ahmad Shah's governor of Herat. The conspiracy was quickly quelled and Darwish Ali was imprisoned, where in his stead, Ahmad Shah appointed Timur Shah as the new governor.

Later, in 1754, Ahmad Shah launched his second campaign to avenge his defeat, eventually re-sieging Nishapur and bringing it to submission.
