= Timur Shah Durrani =

Second Durrani Emperor (r. 1772–1793)

Timur Shah Durrani تیمور شاہ درانی
- Shah of the Durrani Empire; King, Pearl of the Pearls (Note: Persian: شاه در دران, romanized: Šāh Durr-i-Durrān); Khan of Khans (Note: Persian: خاقان, romanized: Xāqān)

Shah of the Durrani Empire
- Reign: November 1772 – 20 May 1793
- Coronation: November 1772
- Predecessor: Ahmad Shah Durrani (Note: Disputed with Sulaiman Mirza Durrani in 1772)
- Successor: Zaman Shah Durrani
- Born: December 1746; Mashhad, Afsharid Iran
- Died: 18 May 1793 (aged 46); Char Bagh, Durrani Empire (present-day Afghanistan)
- Burial: 21 May 1793; Maqbara-i-Timur Shah, Kabul
- Spouse: Gauhar-un-Nissa Begum; Maryam Begum; Gauhar Shad Begum; Ayesha Durrani
- Issue: Zaman Shah Durrani; Mahmud Shah Durrani; Shuja Shah Durrani; Ahmed Mirza Durrani; Sultan Mirza Durrani; Nurdah Mirza Durrani; Malik Gawhar Durrani; Akbar Mirza Durrani; Husein Mirza Durrani; Hasan Mirza Durrani; Abbas Mirza Durrani; Buland Mirza Durrani; Shahrukh Mirza Durrani; Shahpur Mirza Durrani; Jahan Wala Durrani; Humayun Mirza Durrani; Ibrahim Mirza Durrani; Faruk Mirza Durrani; Khawar Mirza Durrani; Ayub Mirza Durrani; Miran Mirza Durrani; Kohandil Mirza Durrani; Nader Mirza Durrani
Names
- Timur Shah Abdali Dur-e-Durran
- Dynasty: Durrani
- Father: Ahmad Shah Durrani
- Religion: Sunni Islam
- Military career
- Conflicts: Sack of Kartarpur; Battle of Amritsar (1757); Battle of Panipat (1761); Battle of Attock (1775); Battle of Rohtas (1779); Siege of Multan (1780); Battle of Shujabad (1780); Siege of Bahawalpur (1780); Battle of Kashmir (1786); Battle of the Amu Darya

Timur Shah Durrani (Note: Pashto: تېمور شاه دراني, romanized: Temur Šāh Durrāni [t̪e.muɾ/t̪äɪ.muɾ ʃɑ(h) d̪u(ɾ).ɾɑ.ni]; Persian: تیمور شاه درانی, romanized: Tēmūr Shāh Durrānī [t̪ʰeː.múːɾ/t̪ʰäj.múːɾ ʃɑː(ʱ) d̪ʊɾ.ɾɑː.níː]) (born Timur Khan Abdali; December 1746 – 20 May 1793) was the second ruler of the Afghan Durrani Empire, from November 1772 until his death in 1793. An ethnic Pashtun, he was the second eldest son of Ahmad Shah Durrani.

== Early life (1746–1772) ==
Timur Shah was born in December 1746, in Mashhad.

He received the city of Sirhind as a wedding gift under his governorship, and was later given the title of Viceroy of Punjab, Kashmir and the Sirhind district in 1757 (when he was only 11 years old), by his father Ahmad Shah Durrani for one year, from May 1757 until April 1758. Ahmad Shah Durrani had immediately appointed Toryal Khan Afridi, the eldest son of his army's commander and his most trustworthy soldier, Awalmir Khan Afridi, to teach horseback riding and swordsmanship to Timur. Toryal Khan Afridi also had the responsibility for the safety and protection of Timur, so he continuously stayed with Timur in the royal palace.

== Reign (1772–1793) ==
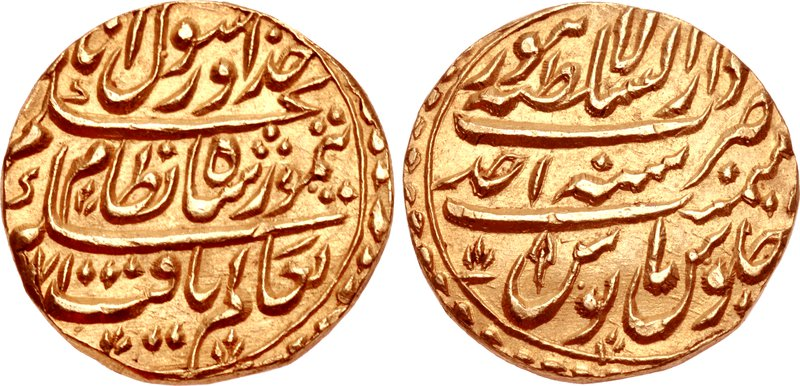
Coin of Timur Shah as Nizam of the Punjab, minted in Lahore, dated 1757–58

Timur Shah ascended to the throne of the Durrani Empire in November 1772 with Shah Humayun giving up his throne.

Timur Shah went to Peshawar to spend the winter there.

== Timur Shah's campaign against the Sikhs (1774–1775) ==
=== Battle of Attock ===
Timur's army crossed the Indus at Attock on 15 January 1775. His forces, though smaller than those of the Sikhs, were supplemented by Faizullah Khan's contingent of some 25,000 men. At Attock, Sikh forces under Milkha Singh of Rawalpindi boldly advanced to intercept Timur Shah's army. In the ensuing skirmish, the Sikhs were defeated and withdrew towards the banks of the Chenab River. Despite this setback, their resistance delayed Timur's march and exposed the weakness of his position.

== The Insurrection of Fayz Allah Khan Khalil ==
Fayz Allah Khan Khalil was a leading zamindar in the Peshawar region and a figure to whom rural communities frequently turned for leadership and counsel. He belonged to the Khalil tribe, a large Afghan tribal confederation residing around Peshawar and traditionally linked by lineage to the Durrani ruling elite. His influence among local tribes and landholders made him a significant regional power.

During the reign of Timur Shah Durrani, tensions persisted within the empire due to administrative centralization, tribal rivalries, and military pressures along the Indian frontier. Sikh forces were increasingly active in Punjab, creating widespread anxiety among Afghan officials and Muslim communities. Fayz Allah Khan exploited these concerns as a pretext to gather armed followers.

=== Conspiracy ===
Fayz Allah Khan Khalil, together with several sardars, plotted to assassinate Timur Shah in hopes of seizing power. Among his principal collaborators was Yaqut Khan, an eunuch who headed the royal harem guards and enjoyed the shah's trust. Another associate was Asad Allah Khan Mohmand, a leading zamindar of Peshawar.

The conspirators sent a message to Timur Shah claiming that Sikh forces were harassing Muslims in Punjab and requested permission to mobilize tribal levies to suppress them. Unaware of the conspirators intentions, Timur Shah approved the request. Fayz Allah Khan then assembled a large force drawn from Peshawar and Kashmir, numbering between 20,000 and 25,000 infantry and cavalry men.

While Timur Shah was residing at the Bala Hissar in Peshawar, the conspirators chose an afternoon moment when the shah was resting. Claiming that the shah had summoned them for a troop review, Fayz Allah Khan and his followers attempted to enter the citadel. When palace guards refused entry, the rebels forced their way in, killing guards and wounding several officials in the royal kitchen. Timur Shah was alerted to the danger and fled to the top of a tower within the citadel. Loyal guards including ghulams, Qizilbash troops, and other palace units were ordered to suppress the uprising. Heavy fighting followed within and around the Bala Hissar.

The imperial forces decisively defeated the rebels, driving them several kilometers from the city. Contemporary sources report extensive bloodshed, with approximately 6,000 people killed, including rebels and civilians who were mistaken for insurgents due to similar dress. Fayz Allah Khan Khalil and his son were captured and executed. Yaqut Khan was also arrested and put to death for his role in facilitating the conspiracy. Several villages associated with suspected rebels were raided, though the violence was later curtailed through the intercession of local sardars. Asad Allah Khan Mohmand managed to escape into the mountainous regions of Bajaur.

According to later accounts, Fayz Allah Khan initially evaded capture by fleeing into the hills of Hashtnagar. Timur Shah, unable to secure him by force, employed deception by publicly declaring that Fayz Allah Khan had been forgiven. A letter of pardon, written and sealed on a leaf of the Quran, was sent to him. Trusting the sanctity of the document, Fayz Allah Khan traveled to Kabul to express repentance. Upon arrival, he was arrested and beheaded on the same day.

Following the suppression of the revolt, Timur Shah returned to Kabul and formally established it as the imperial capital in place of Kandahar. This decision was influenced by Kabul's central position within Afghan territory and the presence of the Qizilbash administrators whom Timur Shah favored.

== Timur Shah's campaign against the Sikhs (1779–1780) ==
=== Battle of Rohtas ===
A year before the death of Ahmad Shah Durrani, the Sikhs conquered Multan in 1772. Timur Shah ascended to the throne of the Durrani Empire after his father's death. Due to Sikhs having been in possession of the provinces of Lahore and Multan, these provinces served as a barrier for any attempt by Timur Shah to invade, many chiefs and nobility, dependencies of Durranis, paid no respect to the Durrani sovereignty, such as Sindh which reduced the amount of tribute and hardly paid it, mostly due to its concurrent civil war between the Talpurs, and the Kalhoras; Nasir Khan Baloch, the ruler of the Khanate of Kalat under Timur Shah did not acknowledge the authority of Afghan monarch, as a result, inducing other Durrani chiefdoms to do the same, including the chief of Bahawalpur, who treated the authority of Timur Shah with no respect. Timur Shah thereupon tried to recover Multan by diplomacy and therefore sent Haji Ali Khan, as his agent, along with companions, to the Bhangi Sikh Chiefs to negotiate, with advice to behave and be polite, but instead, Haji Ali Khan threatened the Bhangi Chiefs to retire from Multan or face the royal wrath. The Bhangis tied Haji to the tree and shot him dead whereas his companions were left unharmed and sent back to report to Timur.

Upon the news of death of his agent, Timur Shah detached a force of 18,000 men that included Yusufzais, Durranis, Mughals and Qizalbashes under general Zangi Khan, with orders to march by less known routes and fall upon the Sikhs unaware and Zangi Khan gave strict orders to his army to keep the movement secret. Zangi Khan halted 25 km from the Sikh camps with orders to imprison anyone who goes in the direction of the Sikh camp to make the Sikhs aware of their presence. Timur Shah positioned himself in the centre, at the head of 5,000 Yousafzai men. Little before daybreak, early morning, the Sikhs completely unaware of Afghan army's presence, were attacked, and though unorganized, the Sikhs gave tough resistance but were eventually overwhelmed. About 3000 Sikhs were killed, and 500 others drowned in river Jhelum in trying to cross it during the Sikh retreat, while 2000 escaped by successfully reaching the opposite bank of the river.

=== Siege of Multan (1780) ===
Timur Shah also marched on Multan, besieging the city in January 1780.

== Kashmir Rebellion of Azad Khan (1783–1786) ==
Hajji Karimdad Khan, a senior arz-begī and a trusted governor of Kashmir under Ahmad Shah Durrani, died in 1783. His youngest son, Azad Khan, was confirmed by Kabul as his successor. Once in office, Azad Khan consolidated his authority aggressively. He expelled his elder brothers, Murtaza Khan and Zaman Khan, diverted state revenues into his own coffers, distributed cash, cloth, and robes of honor to retain the army's loyalty, and enrolled roughly 3,000 Sikhs and other adventurers as nawkars. Azad Khan then stopped remitting revenue to Kabul altogether. His conduct alarmed Timur Shah, who initially hoped to resolve the matter without war.

Timur Shah dispatched Mir Muhammad Ali Khan to counsel and restrain Azad Khan. Mir Muhammad Ali Khan confronted him directly in Srinagar, warned him of the consequences, and seized roughly three lakhs of rupees in cash and kind to cover arrears. Outwardly preparing to return to Kabul, he secretly informed the court that Azad Khan showed clear signs of rebellion.

Timur Shah responded by sending a 30,000-man force under the expelled brothers Murtaza and Zaman, accompanied by chiefs including Faiz Talab Khan Muhammadzai, Nawaz Jang Bangash Kohati, Zardar Khan, and Burhan Khan Popalzai. They advanced to the fort of Pakhli, while Azad Khan camped at nearby Muzaffarabad.

=== The Rebellion ===
A sharp engagement on the Kishanganga ended in disaster for Azad Khan, his commander Mulla A'zam Khan was killed and around 2,000 of his men drowned or were cut down. Azad attempted to flee by boat but was stopped by his cousin Pahlawan Khan, who forced him to rally the troops. Pahlawan reorganized the army, counterattacked, captured Burhan Khan Popalzai, and drove the Durrani force back.

Azad Khan pressed the advantage. When the Durrani troops regrouped at Pakhli, he marched out again and defeated them a second time near Baramulla, capturing Nawaz Jang Bangash, his son, and several officers. During these clashes, a notable Yusufzai fighter, Sayyid 'Ulul Shah, resisted fiercely before being taken alive at Azad Khan's insistence. Impressed by his bravery, Azad placed him on a stipend and had his wounds treated. Azad also attempted to recruit captured Yusufzai prisoners, failed, and after giving them leave to depart secretly ordered boatmen to drown them in the Muzaffarabad River.

News of the defeats pushed Timur Shah to act in person. He marched to Peshawar and sent a larger army under Madad Khan Durrani and Payandah Khan. These commanders induced defections among Azad Khan's supporters by mixing bribes with threats, weakening the Kashmiri position.

Azad attempted a night attack through his officer Shadi Khan, but Madad Khan learned of the plan and beat it off. Repeated encounters produced no decisive breakthrough for Azad, and morale eroded as rumours of collusion spread within his ranks. When evidence of negotiations between his commanders and the Durranis reached him, Azad abandoned the field and withdrew into the mountains of Bunish, seeking refuge with his father-in-law, Raja Rustam Khan.

Raja Rustam Khan initially sheltered Azad, but after receiving a blunt threat from Madad Khan promising to "roll the two of them in one kilim" and fearing Azad might seize his own territory, he disarmed Azad's party by subterfuge. One morning he locked Azad in his room and informed the Durrani commanders. A detachment of 2,000 horse under Islam Khan arrived to arrest him. Realizing he was trapped and expecting torture, Azad shot himself with a pistol. Islam Khan forced the door, found him dying, and after receiving a final curse from Azad decapitated him and sent the head to Timur Shah. Azad Khan died at twenty-seven and ending the rebellion on 11 December 1786.

Timur Shah, despite the rebellion, admired Azad's courage and ordered his burial with respect. Azad's mother was summoned from Qandahar, granted two lakhs of rupees from her son's property, and given further royal favors. She initially refused the Shah's proposal of marriage, but later entered the royal harem, her grandson Fath Jang accompanied her back to Kandahar after the pacification. Kashmir was reabsorbed under firm imperial control.

== Protecting Shah Alam II (1788) ==
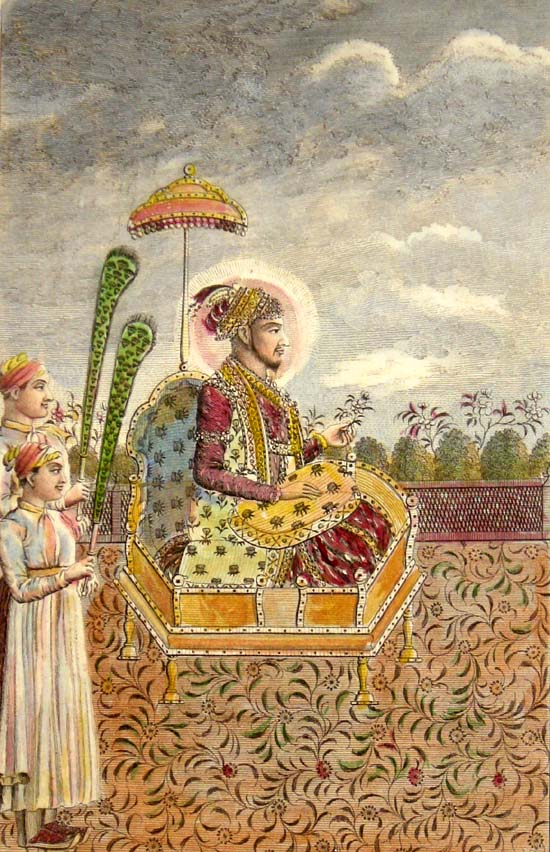
Portrait of Mughal Emperor Shah Alam II, brother-in-law to Timur Shah.

By 1788, Timur Shah Durrani, attempted again to ford the plains of Punjab to rescue his brother-in-law, the Mughal emperor Shah Alam II. The emperor had been blinded by the Rohilla leader Ghulam Qadir, who occupied and plundered Delhi for two and a half months in 1788. Timur Shah prepared an invasion and wrote letters to the English authorities, including Earl Cornwallis, and pleaded for a quick restoration of Shah Alam II to the throne, but was informed that he already had been restored as emperor by the Marathas. Therefore, he retreated back again. Timur Shah ascertained this information by sending an ambassador to the Mughal court and later requested that the British protect and obey the Mughal dynasty.

== March against Shah Murad, ruler of Bukhara (1788–1789) ==
Shah Murad demanded that Timur Shah's governor of Aqcha and Balkh be recalled. When Timur Shah failed to comply, Shah Murad crossed the Amu Darya in the summer of 1788.

Nonetheless, Timur Shah, with his army marched north, at a slow pace to make sure Shah Murad would not be notified of this attack. Timur Shah with his armies arrived at Aqcha on the month of Dhu al-Hijjah, Shah Murad was however prepared, and drew up his men for battle.

== Death and legacy (1793) ==
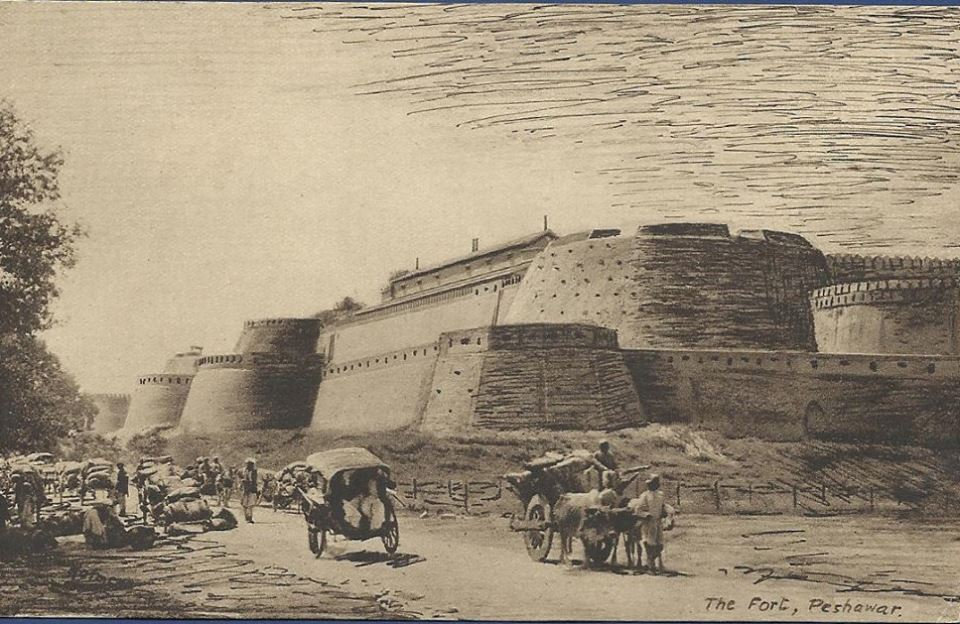
Bala Hissar, Peshawar, in 1910

In late 1792, Timur Shah Durrani resolved to undertake another campaign into the Indian subcontinent. Before setting out, he reorganized the administration of his empire to prevent unrest during his absence. Herat was entrusted to Prince Mahmud, Kandahar to Prince Humayun, and Kabul to Prince Zaman. Advancing eastward, Timur Shah reached Peshawar, where he suppressed resistance among several tribal chiefs in the Khyber Pass and surrounding hill regions. During this period, Fatah Khan Yousafzai, the governor of Muzaffarabad, was summoned to the royal camp and executed for insubordination.

Shortly afterward, Timur Shah fell seriously ill, suffering from severe intestinal inflammation accompanied by persistent vomiting. Despite the efforts of court physicians, his condition continued to deteriorate. Medical advisers recommended an immediate return to Kabul, believing a change of climate might aid his recovery. Aware of the gravity of his illness, Timur Shah insisted on returning to Kabul, the city he regarded as his preferred capital and final resting place.

He arrived in Kabul in early May 1793 but survived only a few days after his return. Timur Shah Durrani died on 18 May 1793, bringing an end to a reign of over twenty years marked by internal consolidation rather than major territorial expansion.

Timur Shah was buried in Kabul, where a mausoleum was later constructed over his grave. By the mid-nineteenth century, the tomb had become one of the city's most notable landmarks. British officer Sir Vincent Eyre, who visited Kabul in 1842, described Timur Shah's mausoleum as one of the few structures of significance in the city at the time, alongside the covered bazaar.

After the death of Timur Shah, Zaman Shah Durrani ascended the throne, inheriting the Durrani Empire, five of his sons would eventually become rulers in their own right or contendents for power. According to Fayz Muhammad those sons were: Humayun Mirza (rebelled after Timur Shah's death in Kandahar and would attempt to take the throne on 3 separate occasions), Mahmud Shah (ruled Afghanistan 1801–1803 and 1809–1818, ruled from 1818 to 1829 in Herat), Zaman Shah (ruled Afghanistan 1793–1801), Firuz al-Din Mirza (ruled Herat virtually independent from 1801 to 1818), Shuja ul-Mulk (ruled Afghanistan 1803–1809), controlled Peshawar briefly in 1810, fled into Sikh and later British protection, made an unsuccessful attempt to conquer Kandahar in 1834, was installed as ruler of Afghanistan by the British from 7 August 1839 until his assassination on 5 April 1842) and Ali Shah (ruled Afghanistan 1818-1819).

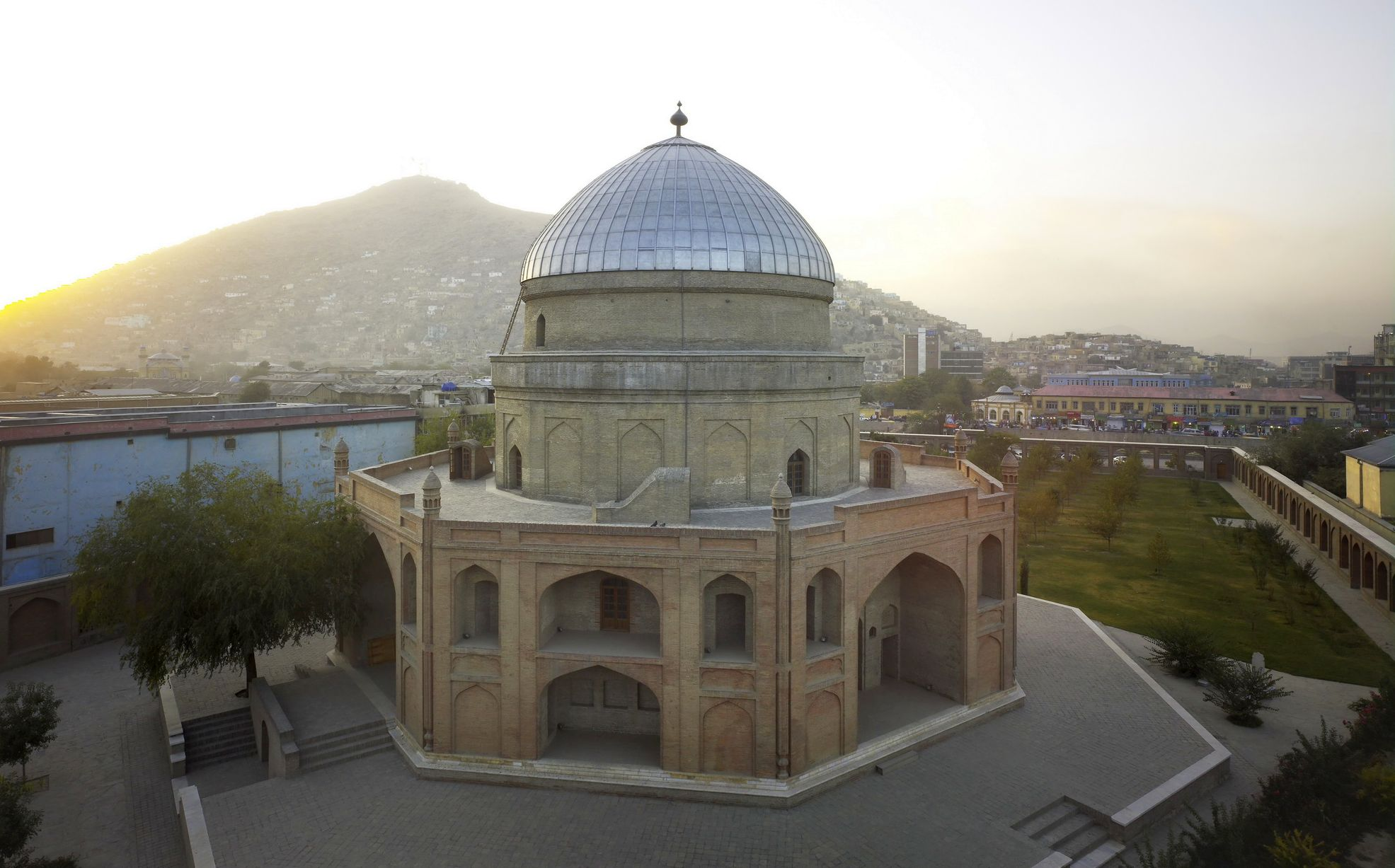
Tomb of Timur Shah Durrani in Kabul

== Notes ==
| Preceded by Ahmad Shah Durrani | Emir of Afghanistan; 4 June 1772 – 18 May 1793 | Succeeded by Zaman Shah Durrani |
